= Hypostomus ericius =

Scientific classification
- Kingdom: Animalia
- Phylum: Chordata
- Class: Actinopterygii
- Order: Siluriformes
- Family: Loricariidae
- Genus: Hypostomus
- Species: H. ericius

Binomial name
- Hypostomus ericius Armbruster, 2003

Species of catfish

Hypostomus ericius, sometimes known as the beige cochliodon, is a species of catfish in the family Loricariidae. It is native to South America, where it occurs in the upper Amazon River drainage in Peru. The species reaches 18.7 cm (7.4 inches) in standard length.

Hypostomus ericius was described in 2003 by Jonathan W. Armbruster (of Auburn University) alongside three other species of Hypostomus: H. hemicochliodon, H. pagei, and H. sculpodon. Its specific epithet, ericius, is derived from Latin and means "hedgehog", referring to the sharp odontodes displayed by the species.
