= Hypostomus eptingi =

Scientific classification
- Kingdom: Animalia
- Phylum: Chordata
- Class: Actinopterygii
- Order: Siluriformes
- Family: Loricariidae
- Genus: Hypostomus
- Species: H. eptingi

Binomial name
- Hypostomus eptingi (Fowler, 1941)

Synonyms
- Chaetostoma eptingi; Chaetostomus eptingi

Species of fish

Hypostomus eptingi is a disputed species of catfish in the family Loricariidae. It is native to South America, where it occurs in northeastern Brazil. It reaches 12.2 cm (4.8 inches) SL and is believed to be a facultative air-breather.

In 2017, Telton Pedro A. Ramos (of Paraíba State University), Cláudio H. Zawadzki (of the State University of Maringá), Robson T. Ramos and Heraldo A. Britski found H. eptingi to be a junior synonym of Hypostomus johnii after a redescription of the latter. FishBase follows the aforementioned classification and lists H. eptingi as a synonym of H. johnii (although the associated page for H. eptingi has yet to be deleted as of August 2022), whereas ITIS lists H. eptingi as a valid species.
