= Hypostomus sipaliwinii =

Scientific classification
- Kingdom: Animalia
- Phylum: Chordata
- Class: Actinopterygii
- Order: Siluriformes
- Family: Loricariidae
- Genus: Hypostomus
- Species: H. sipaliwinii

Binomial name
- Hypostomus sipaliwinii Boeseman, 1968

Species of catfish

Hypostomus sipaliwinii is a species of catfish in the family Loricariidae. It is native to South America, where it occurs in the upper Courantyne River basin in Suriname. The species reaches 12.6 cm (5 inches) in standard length and is believed to be a facultative air-breather. It is possibly synonymous with Hypostomus corantijni.

== Etymology ==
Hypostomus derives from the Greek root "hypo", meaning under, and the Greek root "stoma", meaning mouth. Sipaliwinii refers to a district within Suriname where this fish may be found.
