= Hypostomus niger =

Scientific classification
- Kingdom: Animalia
- Phylum: Chordata
- Class: Actinopterygii
- Division: Teleostei
- Order: Siluriformes
- Family: Loricariidae
- Genus: Hypostomus
- Species: H. niger

Binomial name
- Hypostomus niger (Marini, Nichols & La Monte, 1933)

Synonyms
- Plecostomus niger

Species of catfish

Hypostomus niger is a species of catfish in the family Loricariidae. It is native to South America, where it occurs in rivers in southeastern Brazil. The species reaches 24.5 cm (9.6 inches) SL and is believed to be a facultative air-breather.
