= Obtusirostris =

Obtusirostris may refer to:

- Salmo obtusirostris
- Myzus obtusirostris
- Exocoetus obtusirostris
- Platysmacheilus obtusirostris
- Eumeces obtusirostris
- Potamothrissa obtusirostris
- Mystacoleucus obtusirostris
- Paraliparis obtusirostris
- Salmo obtusirostris salonitana
- Eonemachilus obtusirostris
- Litoria obtusirostris
- Dasyscopelus obtusirostris
- Gobio obtusirostris
- Corallus obtusirostris
- Helcogramma obtusirostris
- Hypostomus obtusirostris
- Atractus obtusirostris
- Calcochloris obtusirostris
