= Hypostomus careopinnatus =

Conservation status
- Least Concern (IUCN 3.1)

Scientific classification
- Kingdom: Animalia
- Phylum: Chordata
- Class: Actinopterygii
- Division: Teleostei
- Order: Siluriformes
- Family: Loricariidae
- Genus: Hypostomus
- Species: H. careopinnatus

Binomial name
- Hypostomus careopinnatus Martins, Marinho, Langeani & J. P. Serra, 2012

Species of catfish

Hypostomus careopinnatus is a species of freshwater ray-finned fish belonging to the family Loricariidae, the suckermouth armored catfishes, and the subfamily Hypostominae, the suckermouth catfishes. This catfish is endemic to Brazil, where it occurs in the Taquari River drainage in the upper portion of the Paraguay River basin. It reaches a standard length of 5.8 cm (2.3 in) and is believed to be a facultative air-breather. Unusually among species of Hypostomus, H. careopinnatus lacks an adipose fin. Although Hypostomus levis also lacks an adipose fin, this characteristic is thought to have evolved independently.
