= Hypostomus seminudus =

Scientific classification
- Kingdom: Animalia
- Phylum: Chordata
- Class: Actinopterygii
- Order: Siluriformes
- Family: Loricariidae
- Genus: Hypostomus
- Species: H. seminudus

Binomial name
- Hypostomus seminudus (C. H. Eigenmann & R. S. Eigenmann, 1888)

Synonyms
- Plecostomus seminudus

Species of catfish

Hypostomus seminudus is a species of catfish in the family Loricariidae. It is native to South America, where it is known only from Brazil. The species is believed to be a facultative air-breather.
