= Hypostomus luteomaculatus =

Scientific classification
- Kingdom: Animalia
- Phylum: Chordata
- Class: Actinopterygii
- Order: Siluriformes
- Family: Loricariidae
- Genus: Hypostomus
- Species: H. luteomaculatus

Binomial name
- Hypostomus luteomaculatus (Devincenzi, 1942)

Synonyms
- Plecostomus luteomaculatus

Species of catfish

Hypostomus luteomaculatus is a species of catfish in the family Loricariidae. It is native to South America, where it occurs in the Uruguay River basin in Argentina, Brazil, and Uruguay. The species reaches 28 cm (11 inches) in standard length and is believed to be a facultative air-breather.
