= Hypostomus saramaccensis =

Scientific classification
- Kingdom: Animalia
- Phylum: Chordata
- Class: Actinopterygii
- Order: Siluriformes
- Family: Loricariidae
- Genus: Hypostomus
- Species: H. saramaccensis

Binomial name
- Hypostomus saramaccensis Boeseman, 1968

Species of catfish

Hypostomus saramaccensis is a species of catfish in the family Loricariidae. It is native to South America, where it occurs in the Guianan coastal drainage basins of Suriname, including the Saramacca River, for which it is named. The species reaches 11.5 cm (4.5 inches) in standard length and is believed to be a facultative air-breather.
