= Hypostomus simios =

Scientific classification
- Kingdom: Animalia
- Phylum: Chordata
- Class: Actinopterygii
- Division: Teleostei
- Order: Siluriformes
- Family: Loricariidae
- Genus: Hypostomus
- Species: H. simios

Binomial name
- Hypostomus simios Hollanda Carvalho & Weber, 2005

Species of fish

Hypostomus simios is a species of catfish in the family Loricariidae. It is native to South America, where it occurs in the Cupixi River in the state of Amapá in Brazil. The species reaches 15.8 cm (6.2 inches) SL and is believed to be a facultative air-breather.
