= Hypostomus microstomus =

Scientific classification
- Domain: Eukaryota
- Kingdom: Animalia
- Phylum: Chordata
- Class: Actinopterygii
- Order: Siluriformes
- Family: Loricariidae
- Genus: Hypostomus
- Species: H. microstomus

Binomial name
- Hypostomus microstomus Weber, 1987

Species of catfish

Hypostomus microstomus is a species of catfish in the family Loricariidae. It is native to South America, where it occurs in the middle Paraná River basin in Argentina, Brazil, Paraguay, and Uruguay. The species reaches 24 cm (9.4 inches) in standard length and is believed to be a facultative air-breather.
