= Hypostomus macrops =

Conservation status
- Least Concern (IUCN 3.1)

Scientific classification
- Kingdom: Animalia
- Phylum: Chordata
- Class: Actinopterygii
- Order: Siluriformes
- Family: Loricariidae
- Genus: Hypostomus
- Species: H. macrops

Binomial name
- Hypostomus macrops (C. H. Eigenmann & R. S. Eigenmann, 1888)

Synonyms
- Plecostomus macrops

Species of fish

Hypostomus macrops is a species of catfish in the family Loricariidae. It is native to South America, where it occurs in the Das Velhas River basin. The species reaches 28.8 cm (11.3 inches) SL and is believed to be a facultative air-breather.
