= Hypostomus garmani =

Scientific classification
- Domain: Eukaryota
- Kingdom: Animalia
- Phylum: Chordata
- Class: Actinopterygii
- Order: Siluriformes
- Family: Loricariidae
- Genus: Hypostomus
- Species: H. garmani

Binomial name
- Hypostomus garmani (Regan, 1904)

Synonyms
- Plecostomus garmani

Species of fish

Hypostomus garmani is a species of catfish in the family Loricariidae. It is native to South America, where it occurs in the São Francisco River basin. The species reaches 13 cm (5.1 inches) SL and is believed to be a facultative air-breather.

== Etymology ==
The fish is named in honor of American ichthyologist-herpetologist Samuel Garman (1843–1927), of Harvard University, who loaned the types and sent the specimens to the British Museum (Natural History).
