= Hypostomus tapijara =

Scientific classification
- Kingdom: Animalia
- Phylum: Chordata
- Class: Actinopterygii
- Order: Siluriformes
- Family: Loricariidae
- Genus: Hypostomus
- Species: H. tapijara

Binomial name
- Hypostomus tapijara Oyakawa, Akama & Zanata, 2005

Species of catfish

Hypostomus tapijara is a species of catfish in the family Loricariidae. It is native to South America, where it occurs in the Ribeira de Iguape River basin in Brazil. The species reaches 37.8 cm (14.9 inches) in standard length and is believed to be a facultative air-breather. The morphology and coloration of Hypostomus tapijara can be used to distinguish it from all other Hypostomus species present in the Ribeira de Iguape basin.
