= Hypostomus micromaculatus =

Scientific classification
- Kingdom: Animalia
- Phylum: Chordata
- Class: Actinopterygii
- Order: Siluriformes
- Family: Loricariidae
- Genus: Hypostomus
- Species: H. micromaculatus

Binomial name
- Hypostomus micromaculatus Boeseman, 1968

Species of catfish

Hypostomus micromaculatus is a species of catfish in the family Loricariidae. It is native to South America, where it occurs in the upper and middle Suriname River basin. The species reaches 18.5 cm (7.3 in) in standard length and is believed to be a facultative air-breather.

Hypostomus micromaculatus sometimes appears in the aquarium trade, where it is typically referred to as the smallspotted Suriname pleco.
