= Hypostomus variipictus =

Conservation status
- Data Deficient (IUCN 3.1)

Scientific classification
- Kingdom: Animalia
- Phylum: Chordata
- Class: Actinopterygii
- Order: Siluriformes
- Family: Loricariidae
- Genus: Hypostomus
- Species: H. variipictus

Binomial name
- Hypostomus variipictus (Ihering, 1911)

Synonyms
- Plecostomus variipictus

Species of catfish

Hypostomus variipictus is a species of catfish in the family Loricariidae. It is native to South America, where it occurs in the Rio Grande basin in Brazil, with its type locality being given as the Pardo River. The species reaches 37 cm (15 in) in total length and is believed to be a facultative air-breather. Within its range, it may be confused with the related species Hypostomus margaritifer, and some specimens of H. variipictus have previously been thought to represent an atypical color morph of H. margaritifer.
