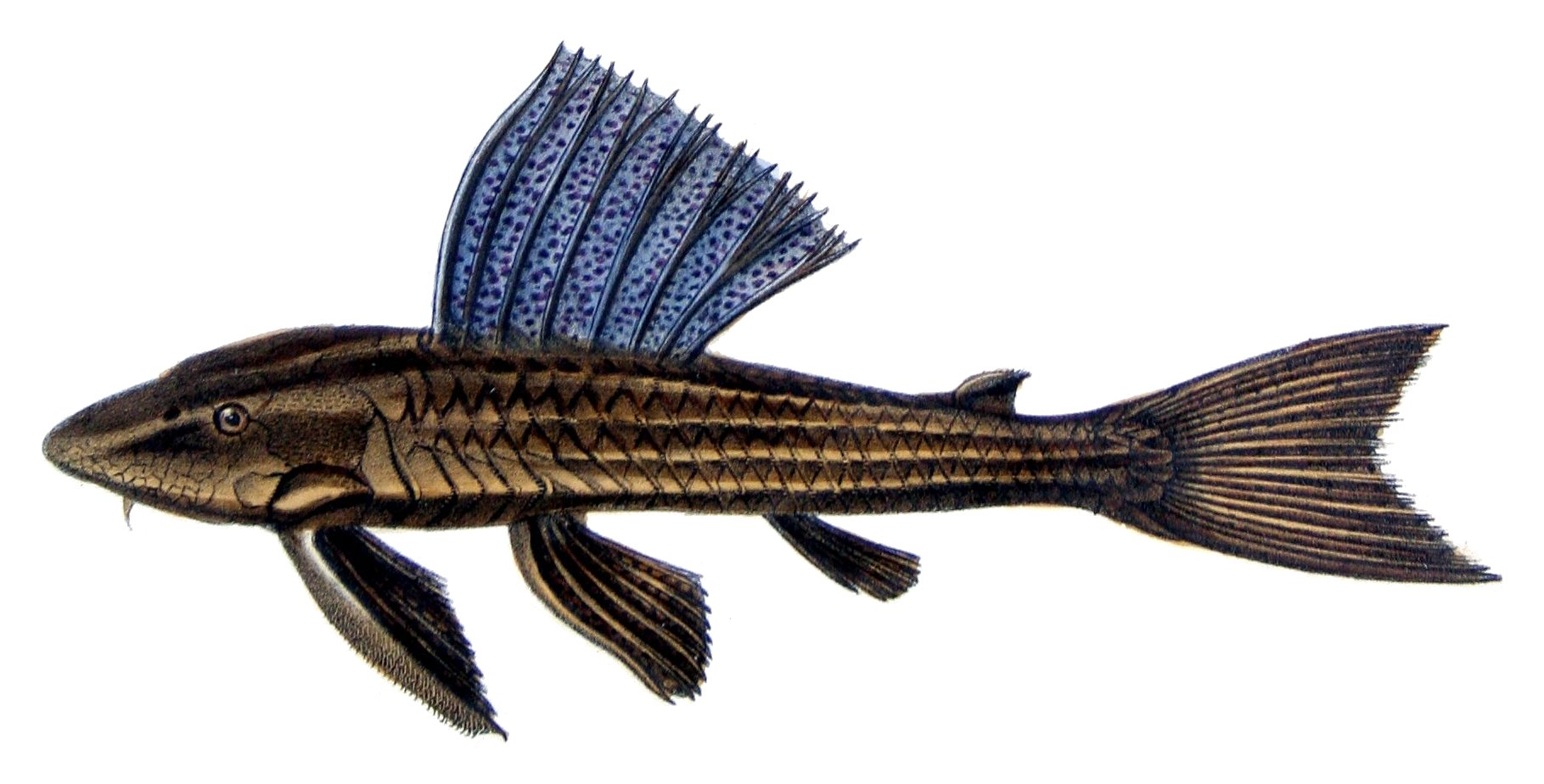

Scientific classification
- Kingdom: Animalia
- Phylum: Chordata
- Class: Actinopterygii
- Division: Teleostei
- Order: Siluriformes
- Family: Loricariidae
- Genus: Hypostomus
- Species: H. subcarinatus

Binomial name
- Hypostomus subcarinatus (Castelnau, 1855)

= Hypostomus subcarinatus =

Species of catfish

Hypostomus subcarinatus is a species of catfish in the family Loricariidae. It is native to South America, where it occurs in the coastal drainage basins of eastern Brazil, including the São Francisco River basin. The species reaches 31 cm (12.2 inches) in total length and is believed to be a facultative air-breather. Although originally described in 1855, no verifiable scientific record of the species was made until a 2014 survey of an urban lake in downtown Belo Horizonte in the state of Minas Gerais collected seven specimens that were later recognized as Hypostomus subcarinatus, leading to a redescription of the species in 2019.
