= Hypostomus kopeyaka =

Scientific classification
- Domain: Eukaryota
- Kingdom: Animalia
- Phylum: Chordata
- Class: Actinopterygii
- Order: Siluriformes
- Family: Loricariidae
- Genus: Hypostomus
- Species: H. kopeyaka

Binomial name
- Hypostomus kopeyaka P. H. Carvalho, F. C. T. Lima & Zawadzki, 2010

Species of catfish

Hypostomus kopeyaka is a species of catfish in the family Loricariidae. It is native to South America, where it occurs in the basin of the Tiquié River, a tributary of the Vaupés River, which is itself a tributary of the Rio Negro, in Brazil, although it has also been reported from Vaupés Department in Colombia. It generally occurs in rapids, cataract pools, and slow-flowing portions of the Tiquié and some of its large tributaries. The species reaches 22.6 cm (8.9 inches) in standard length and is believed to be a facultative air-breather.

== Etymology ==
Its specific epithet, kopeyaka, refers to its common name in the Tuyuca and Tucano languages, kope ya’ka, reportedly meaning "pleco from the holes", in reference to the species' tendency to hide in holes in the river bank.
