= Hypostomus perdido =

Scientific classification
- Kingdom: Animalia
- Phylum: Chordata
- Class: Actinopterygii
- Division: Teleostei
- Order: Siluriformes
- Family: Loricariidae
- Genus: Hypostomus
- Species: H. perdido

Binomial name
- Hypostomus perdido Zawadzki, Tencatt & Froehlich, 2014

Species of fish

Hypostomus perdido is a species of catfish in the family Loricariidae. It is native to South America, where it occurs in the Perdido River, which is part of the Paraguay River basin in Brazil. It is typically found in portions of the river that have still or slow-moving water. The species reaches 18.1 cm (7.1 inches) SL and is believed to be a facultative air-breather. Its specific epithet, perdido, references the river in which it occurs.
