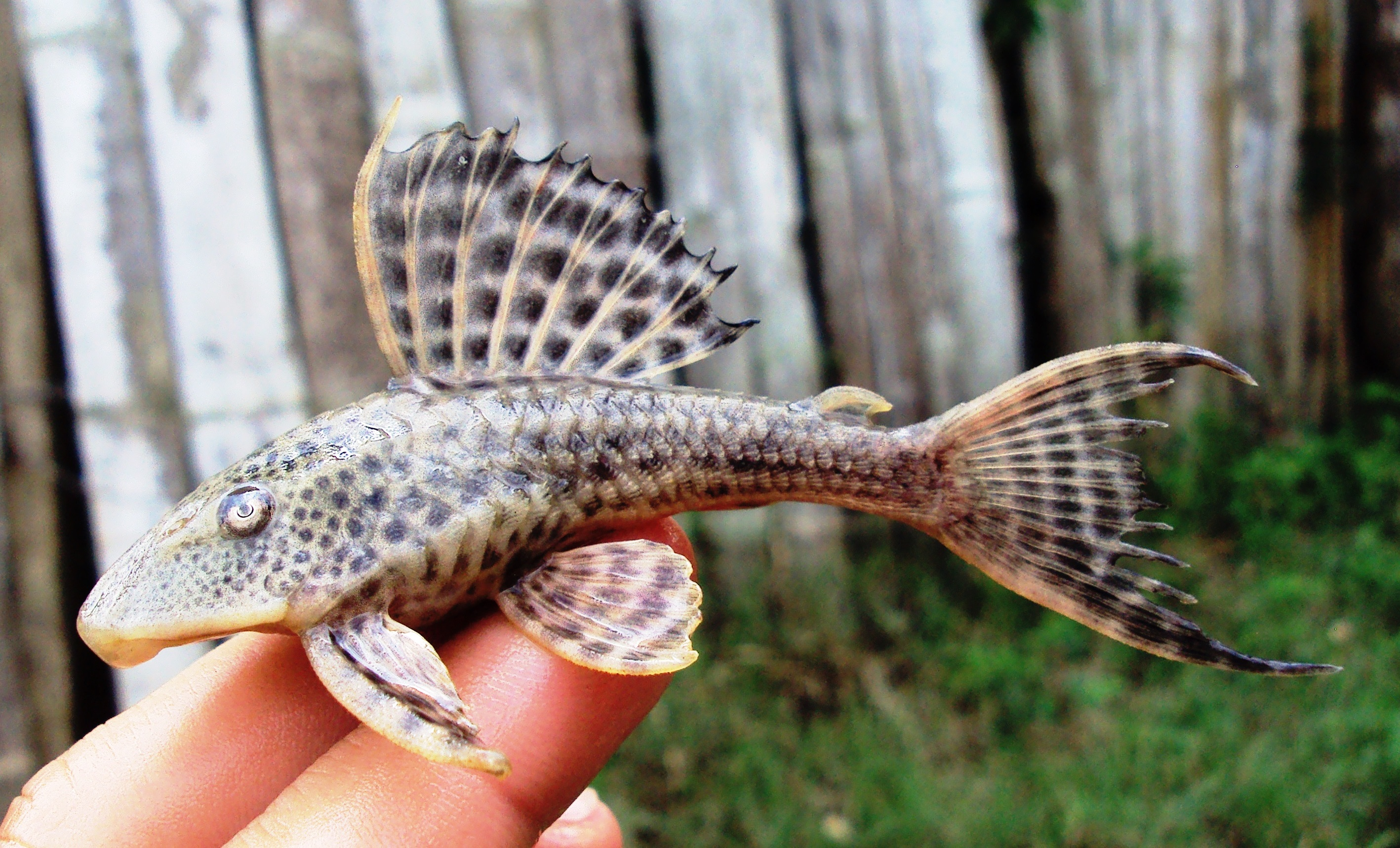

Scientific classification
- Domain: Eukaryota
- Kingdom: Animalia
- Phylum: Chordata
- Class: Actinopterygii
- Order: Siluriformes
- Family: Loricariidae
- Genus: Hypostomus
- Species: H. hondae

Binomial name
- Hypostomus hondae (Regan, 1912)

Synonyms
- Plecostomus hondae; Cochliodon hondae

= Hypostomus hondae =

Species of fish

Hypostomus hondae is a species of catfish in the family Loricariidae. It is native to South America, where it occurs in the drainage basins of Lake Maracaibo and the Magdalena River. It is known to feed on detritus containing algae. The species reaches 35 cm (13.8 inches) SL and is believed to be a facultative air-breather.
