= Hypostomus jaguar =

Scientific classification
- Kingdom: Animalia
- Phylum: Chordata
- Class: Actinopterygii
- Order: Siluriformes
- Family: Loricariidae
- Genus: Hypostomus
- Species: H. jaguar

Binomial name
- Hypostomus jaguar Zanata, Sardeiro & Zawadzki, 2013

Species of fish

Hypostomus jaguar, sometimes known as the jaguar pleco, is a species of catfish in the family Loricariidae. It is native to South America, where it occurs in the Paraguaçu River basin in the state of Bahia in Brazil.

H. jaguar is typically found in stretches of the Paraguaçu and its tributaries with a width of up to 60 m (197 ft) and a depth of up to 1.5 m (4.9 ft). The areas that the species inhabits are often distinguished by the presence of a rocky substrate, dark-colored water, and moderate to fast current. It occurs at elevations ranging from 143 to 350 m (469 to 1148 ft) above sea level. It is known to be sympatric with its congener Hypostomus chrysostiktos.

H. jaguar reaches 17.6 cm (6.9 inches) SL. Its specific epithet, jaguar, references its pattern of dark-colored spots, which resemble those of a jaguar. It is believed to be a facultative air-breather. It was described in 2013 by Angela M. Zanata, Byanca Sardeiro, and Cláudio H. Zawadzki on the basis of its distinctive coloration and morphology.
