= Hypostomus sertanejo =

Scientific classification
- Kingdom: Animalia
- Phylum: Chordata
- Class: Actinopterygii
- Order: Siluriformes
- Family: Loricariidae
- Genus: Hypostomus
- Species: H. sertanejo

Binomial name
- Hypostomus sertanejo Zawadzki, Ramos & Sabaj, 2017

Species of catfish

Hypostomus sertanejo is a species of catfish in the family Loricariidae. It is native to South America, where it occurs in the Jaguaribe River basin in northeastern Brazil. The species reaches 18.9 cm (7.4 inches) in standard length. It was described in 2017 by Cláudio Henrique Zawadzki (of the State University of Maringá), Telton Pedro A. Ramos (of the Federal University of Paraíba), and Mark H. Sabaj Pérez (of the Academy of Natural Sciences of Drexel University). FishBase does not yet list this species.

Hypostomus sertanejo sometimes appears in the aquarium trade, where it is typically referred to as the Sertanejo pleco.
