= Hypostomus myersi =

Scientific classification
- Kingdom: Animalia
- Phylum: Chordata
- Class: Actinopterygii
- Division: Teleostei
- Order: Siluriformes
- Family: Loricariidae
- Genus: Hypostomus
- Species: H. myersi

Binomial name
- Hypostomus myersi (Gosline, 1947)

Synonyms
- Plecostomus myersi

Species of fish

Hypostomus myersi is a species of catfish in the family Loricariidae. It is native to South America, where it occurs in the basins of the Iguazu River and the Urugua-í River. The species reaches 20.7 cm (8.1 inches) SL and is believed to be a facultative air-breather.

== Etymology ==
The fish is named in honor of American ichthyologist George S. Myers (1905–1985), of Stanford University.
