= Hypostomus vermicularis =

Scientific classification
- Kingdom: Animalia
- Phylum: Chordata
- Class: Actinopterygii
- Order: Siluriformes
- Family: Loricariidae
- Genus: Hypostomus
- Species: H. vermicularis

Binomial name
- Hypostomus vermicularis (C. H. Eigenmann & R. S. Eigenmann, 1888)

Synonyms
- Plecostomus vermicularis

Species of catfish

Hypostomus vermicularis is a species of catfish in the family Loricariidae. It is native to South America, where it reportedly occurs in the coastal drainage basins of eastern Brazil. The species reaches 19 cm (7.5 inches) in standard length and is believed to be a facultative air-breather.
