= Hypostomus uruguayensis =

Scientific classification
- Domain: Eukaryota
- Kingdom: Animalia
- Phylum: Chordata
- Class: Actinopterygii
- Order: Siluriformes
- Family: Loricariidae
- Genus: Hypostomus
- Species: H. uruguayensis

Binomial name
- Hypostomus uruguayensis Reis, Weber & Malabarba, 1990

Species of catfish

Hypostomus uruguayensis is a species of catfish in the family Loricariidae. It is native to South America, where it occurs in the Uruguay River basin in Argentina, Brazil, and possibly Uruguay. The species reaches 34.5 cm (13.6 inches) in total length, can weigh up to at least 350 g, and is believed to be a facultative air-breather.
