= Hypostomus mutucae =

Scientific classification
- Kingdom: Animalia
- Phylum: Chordata
- Class: Actinopterygii
- Order: Siluriformes
- Family: Loricariidae
- Genus: Hypostomus
- Species: H. mutucae

Binomial name
- Hypostomus mutucae Knaack, 1999

Species of fish

Hypostomus mutucae is a species of catfish in the family Loricariidae. It is native to South America, where it occurs in the Cuiabá River basin in Brazil. The species reaches 10.9 cm (4.3 inches) SL.

H. mutucae occasionally appears in the aquarium trade, where it is typically referred to either as the Mutuca pleco or by its associated L-number, which is LDA-010.
