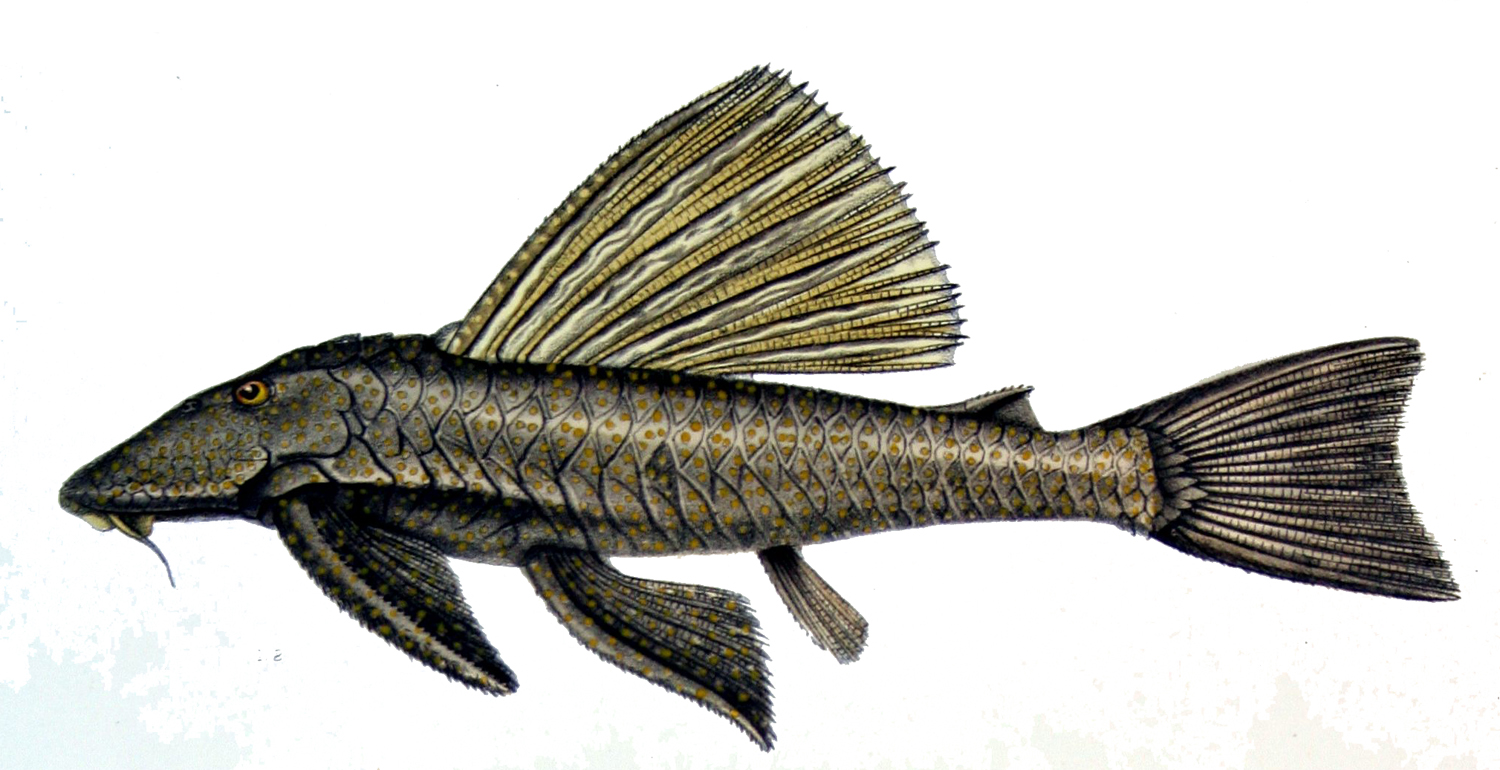

Conservation status
- Least Concern (IUCN 3.1)

Scientific classification
- Kingdom: Animalia
- Phylum: Chordata
- Class: Actinopterygii
- Division: Teleostei
- Order: Siluriformes
- Family: Loricariidae
- Genus: Hypostomus
- Species: H. alatus

Binomial name
- Hypostomus alatus Castelnau, 1855

= Hypostomus alatus =

Species of catfish

Hypostomus alatus is a species of freshwater ray-finned fish belonging to the family Loricariidae, the suckermouth armored catfishes, and the subfamily Hypostominae, the suckermouth catfishes. This catfish occurs in the São Francisco River basin in the Brazilian states of Alagoas, Bahia, Minas Gerais and Sergipe. This species reaches a standard length of 36.6 cm (14.4 in).
