= Hypostomus hemiurus =

Scientific classification
- Kingdom: Animalia
- Phylum: Chordata
- Class: Actinopterygii
- Order: Siluriformes
- Family: Loricariidae
- Genus: Hypostomus
- Species: H. hemiurus

Binomial name
- Hypostomus hemiurus (Eigenmann, 1912)

Synonyms
- Plecostomus hemiurus

Species of catfish

Hypostomus hemiurus is a species of catfish in the family Loricariidae. It is native to South America, where it occurs in various coastal drainage basins in Guyana, reportedly including the Potaro River, the Mazaruni River, and the Rupununi. The species reaches 20.1 cm (7.9 inches) in standard length and is believed to be a facultative air-breather.
