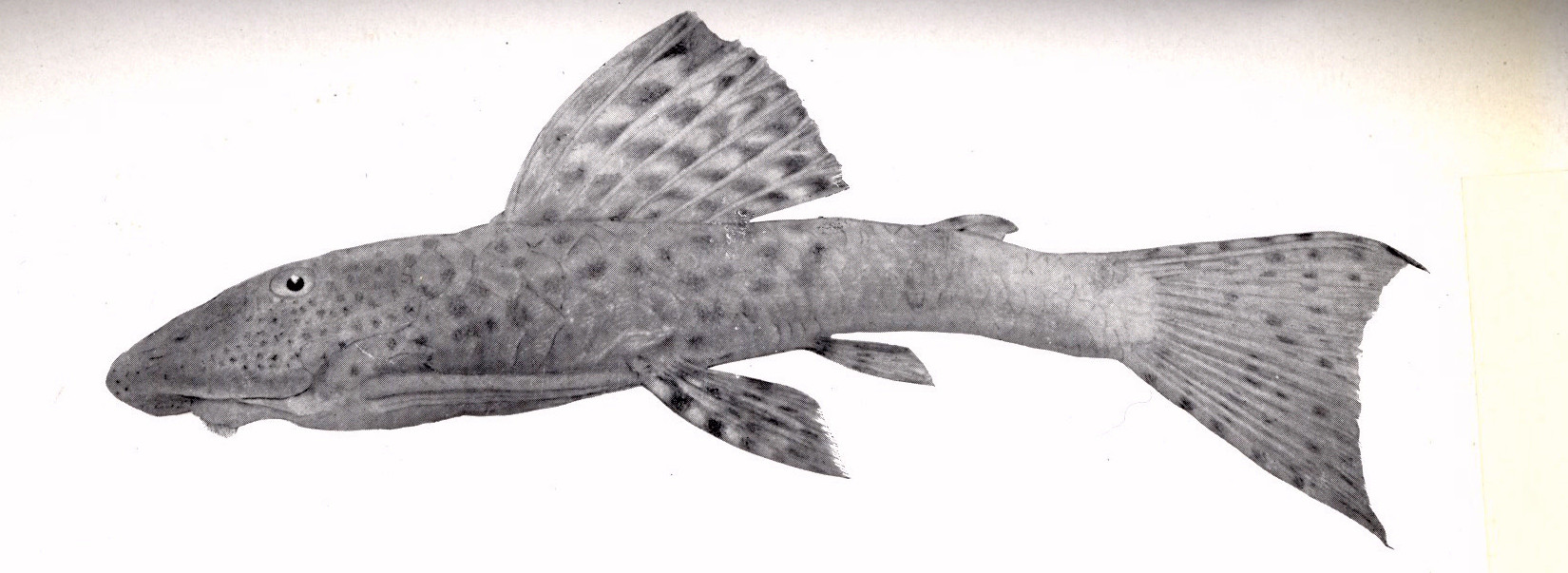
- Lateral view of the type specimen of H. derbyi.

Scientific classification
- Kingdom: Animalia
- Phylum: Chordata
- Class: Actinopterygii
- Division: Teleostei
- Order: Siluriformes
- Family: Loricariidae
- Genus: Hypostomus
- Species: H. derbyi

Binomial name
- Hypostomus derbyi (Haseman, 1911)

Synonyms
- Plecostomus derbyi

= Hypostomus derbyi =

Species of fish

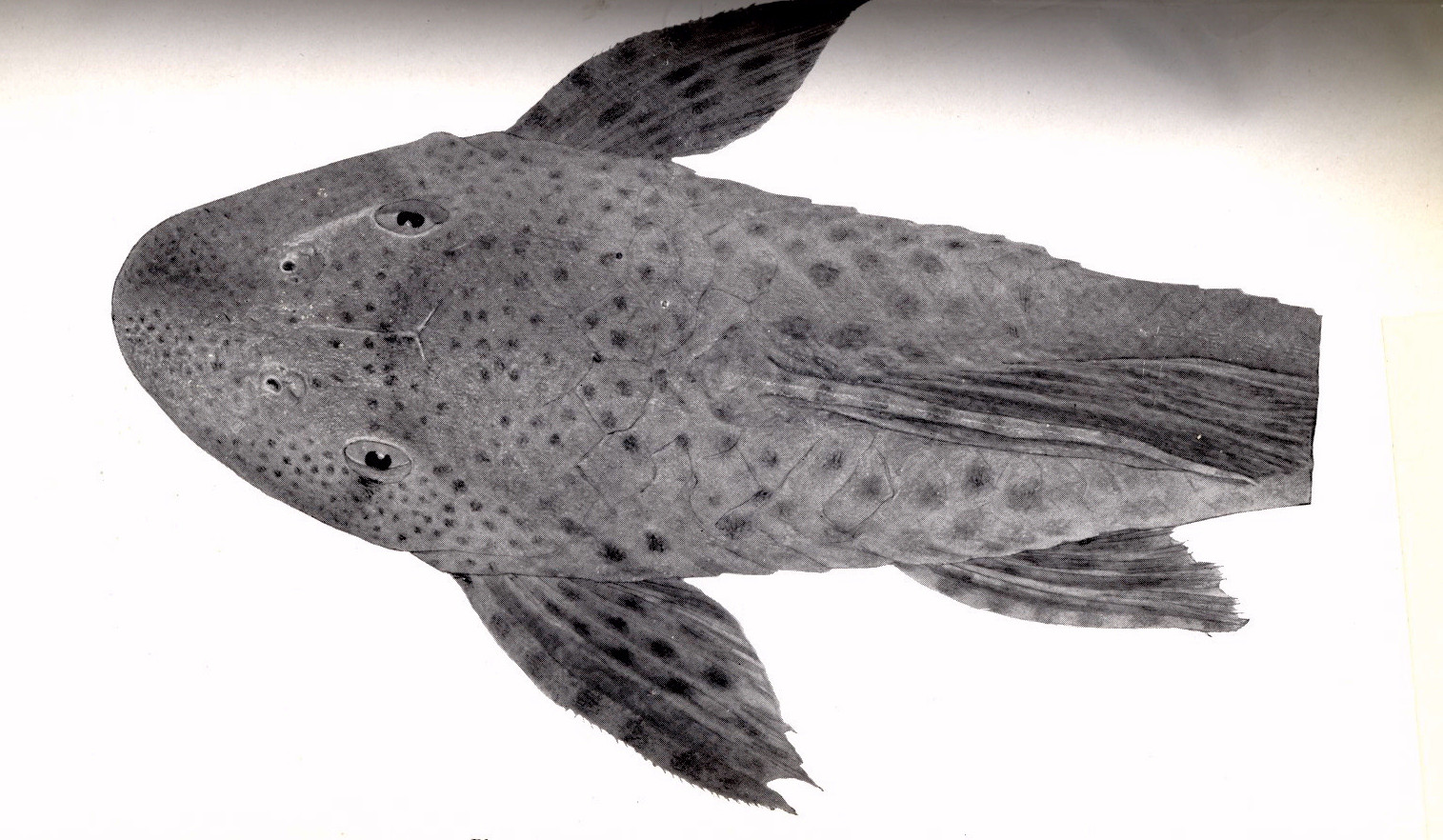
Dorsal view of the type specimen of H. derbyi.

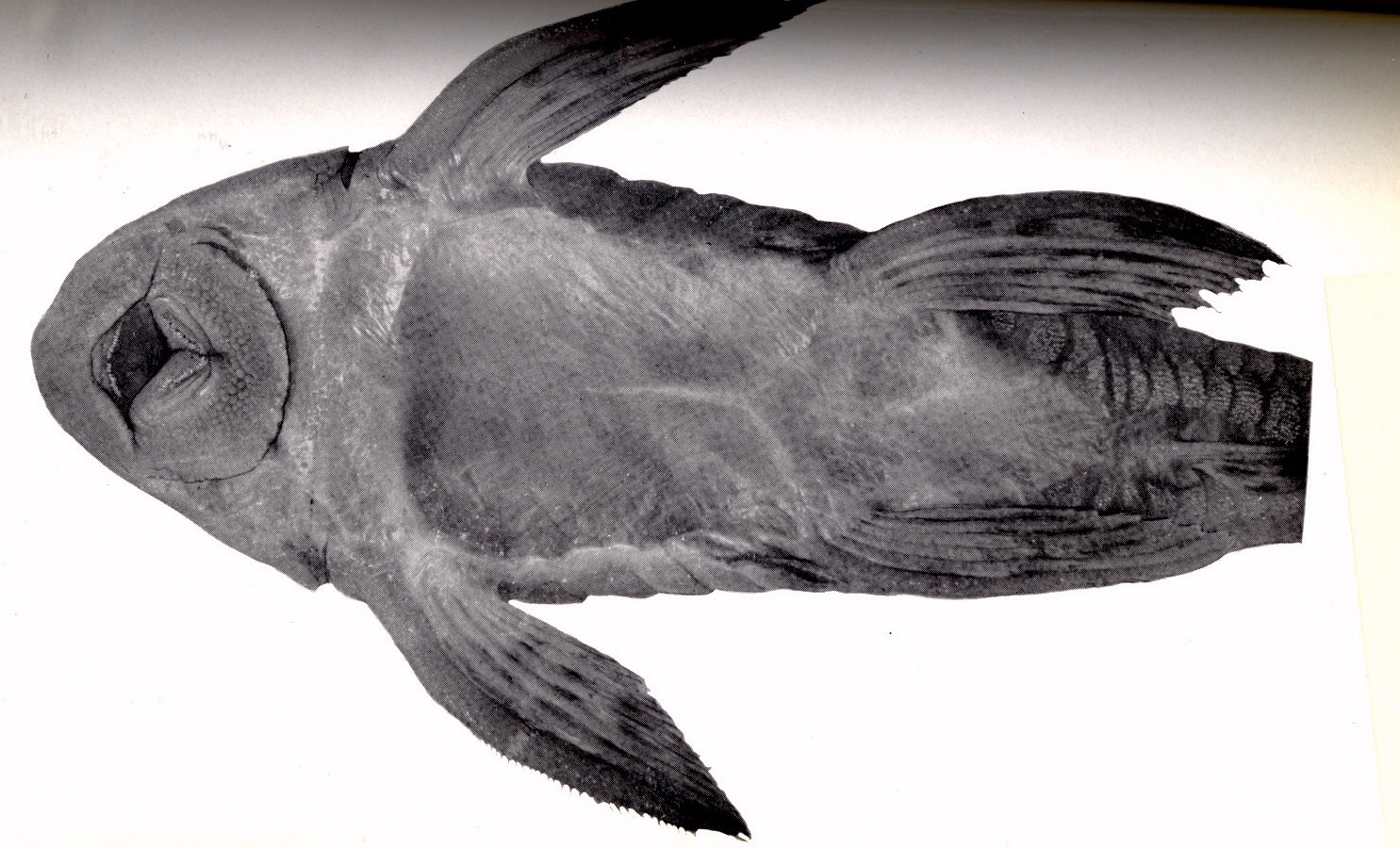
Ventral view of the type specimen of H. derbyi.

Hypostomus derbyi is a species of catfish in the family Loricariidae. It is native to South America, where it occurs in the basins of the Iguazu River and the Urugua-í River, which are both tributaries of the Paraná River. The species reaches 31 cm (12.2 inches) in standard length and is believed to be a facultative air-breather.

== Etymology ==
The fish is named in honor of American geologist Orville A. Derby (1851–1915), “who has spent thirty-five years in the cause of science in Brazil, and who rendered [Haseman] more assistance than any other man in South America”.
