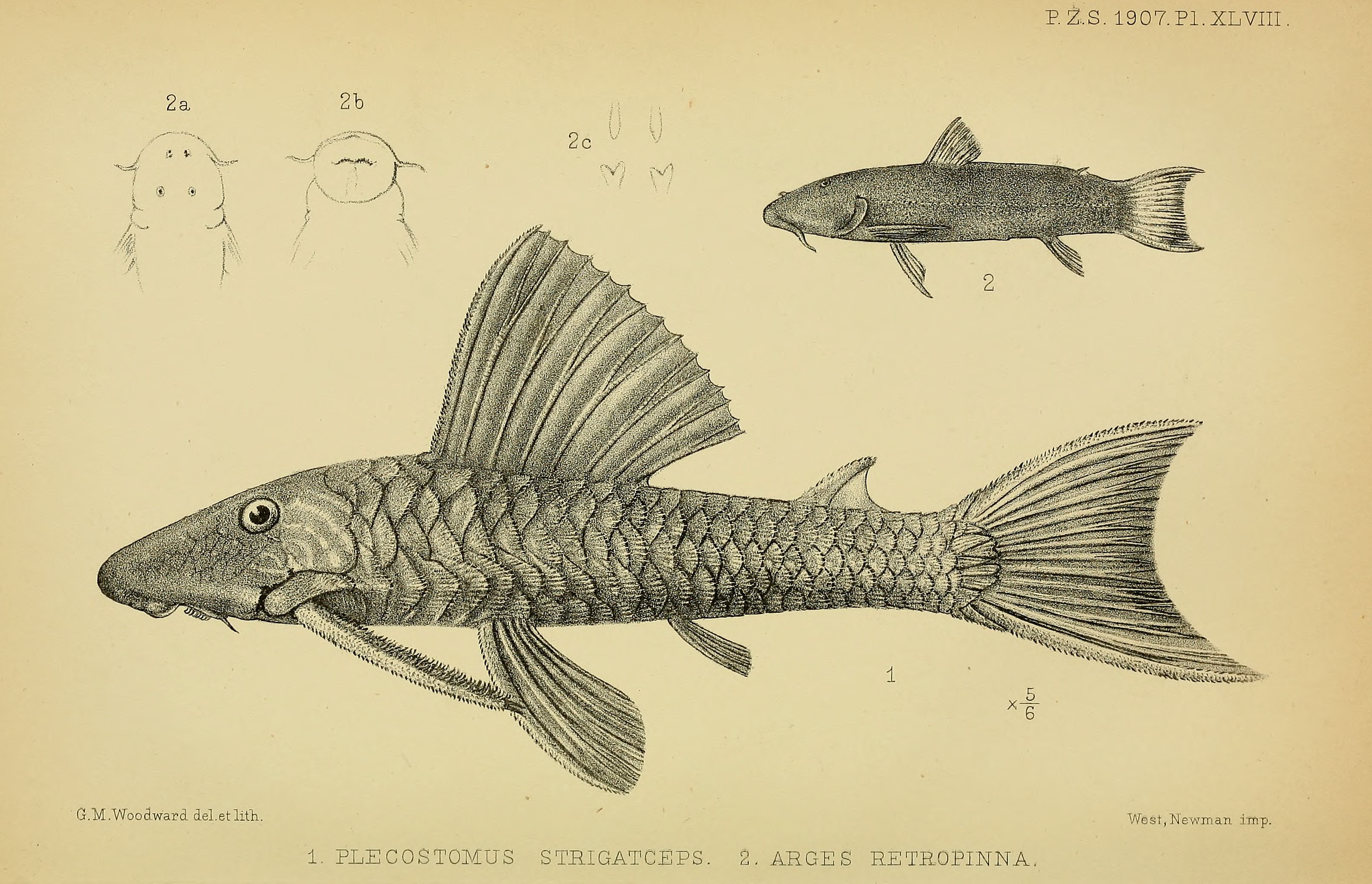

Scientific classification
- Domain: Eukaryota
- Kingdom: Animalia
- Phylum: Chordata
- Class: Actinopterygii
- Order: Siluriformes
- Family: Loricariidae
- Genus: Hypostomus
- Species: H. strigaticeps

Binomial name
- Hypostomus strigaticeps (Regan, 1908)

Synonyms
- Plecostomus strigaticeps

= Hypostomus strigaticeps =

Species of catfish

Hypostomus strigaticeps is a species of catfish in the family Loricariidae. It is native to South America, where it occurs in the Tietê River basin in Brazil. The species reaches 16 cm (6.3 inches) in standard length and is believed to be a facultative air-breather. It feeds primarily on algae, with the diet of individuals in polluted habitats differing from that of those in more preserved ones.
