= Hypostomus brevicauda =

Conservation status
- Data Deficient (IUCN 3.1)

Scientific classification
- Kingdom: Animalia
- Phylum: Chordata
- Class: Actinopterygii
- Division: Teleostei
- Order: Siluriformes
- Family: Loricariidae
- Genus: Hypostomus
- Species: H. brevicauda

Binomial name
- Hypostomus brevicauda (Günther, 1864)

Synonyms
- Plecostomus brevicauda Günther, 1864

Species of catfish

Hypostomus brevicauda is a species of freshwater ray-finned fish belonging to the family Loricariidae, the suckermouth armored catfishes, and the subfamily Hypostominae, the suckermouth catfishes. This species is known only from its type material, which was given the imprecise location of "Bahia". This species reaches a standard length of 19.6 cm (7.7 in). Species within the genus Hypostomus are thought to be facultative air breathers.
