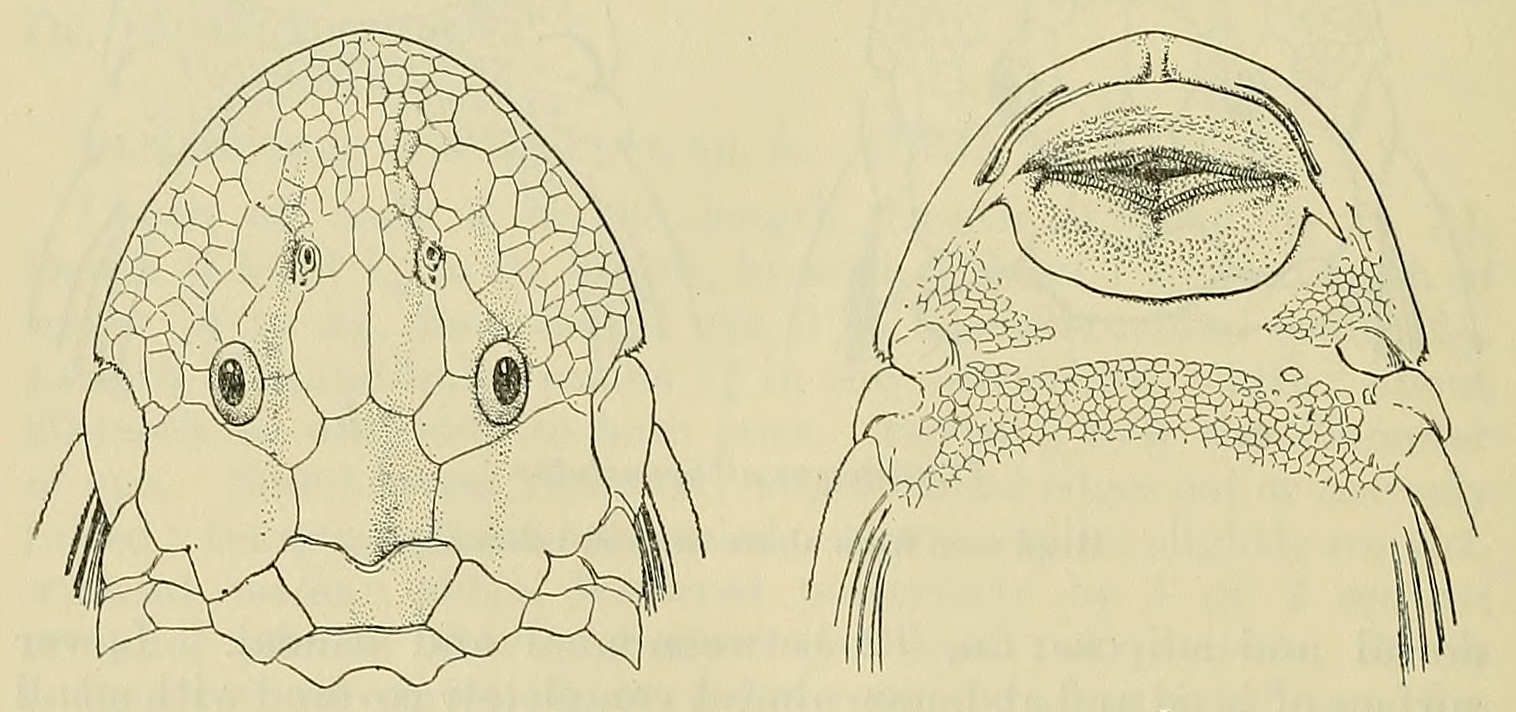
- Illustrations of the dorsal and ventral views of the head of H. goyazensis.

Scientific classification
- Kingdom: Animalia
- Phylum: Chordata
- Class: Actinopterygii
- Division: Teleostei
- Order: Siluriformes
- Family: Loricariidae
- Genus: Hypostomus
- Species: H. goyazensis

Binomial name
- Hypostomus goyazensis (Regan, 1908)

Synonyms
- Plecostomus goyazensis

= Hypostomus goyazensis =

Species of catfish

Hypostomus goyazensis is a species of catfish in the family Loricariidae. The species reaches 26 cm (10.2 inches) in total length and is believed to be a facultative air-breather. Its specific epithet is believed to refer to the Brazilian state of Goiás, in which it is found.

== Distribution ==
It is native to South America, where it occurs in the upper Araguaia River basin in Brazil.

== Genetics ==
A 2006 genetic analysis conducted by Anderson L. Alves, Claudio Oliveira, Mauro Nirchio, Angel Granado, and Fausto Foresti concluded that Hypostomus goyazensis has a diploid number of 72 chromosomes. This is the same diploid number seen in its congener H. regani, although it differs from the diploid number of 68 chromosomes seen in H. ancistroides.
