= Hypostomus aspidolepis =

Conservation status
- Least Concern (IUCN 3.1)

Scientific classification
- Kingdom: Animalia
- Phylum: Chordata
- Class: Actinopterygii
- Division: Teleostei
- Order: Siluriformes
- Family: Loricariidae
- Genus: Hypostomus
- Species: H. aspidolepis

Binomial name
- Hypostomus aspidolepis (Günther, 1867)

Synonyms
- Hemiancistrus aspidolepis Günther, 1867; Chaetostomus aspidolepis (Günther, 1867); Plecostomus plecostomus panamensis C. H. Eigenmann, 1922; Hypostomus panamensis (C. H. Eigenmann, 1922)

Species of catfish

Hypostomus aspidolepis, the Panama suckermouth, is a species of freshwater ray-finned fish belonging to the family Loricariidae, the suckermouth armored catfishes, and the subfamily Hypostominae, the suckermouth catfishes. This catfish is found in Central America, where it occurs from the Térraba River in Costra Rica east to the Tuira River in eastern Panama on the Pacific slope, while on the Atlantic slope it is found from the Parismina River drainage in Costa Rica eastward to the Chagres River in Panama. This species reaches a standard length of 40 cm (16 in) and is believed to be a facultative air-breather.
