= Hypostomus roseopunctatus =

Scientific classification
- Domain: Eukaryota
- Kingdom: Animalia
- Phylum: Chordata
- Class: Actinopterygii
- Order: Siluriformes
- Family: Loricariidae
- Genus: Hypostomus
- Species: H. roseopunctatus

Binomial name
- Hypostomus roseopunctatus Reis, Weber & Malabarba, 1990

Species of catfish

Hypostomus roseopunctatus is a species of catfish in the family Loricariidae. It is native to South America, where it occurs in the Uruguay River basin in the Río de la Plata system in Argentina and Brazil. The species reaches 43.3 cm (17 inches) in total length, can weigh up to at least 796 g, and is believed to be a facultative air-breather.

Hypostomus roseopunctatus appears in the aquarium trade, where it is typically referred to either as the rose-spotted pleco or by its associated L-number, which is L-311, although that identifier may also be used to refer to a similar, likely undescribed species.
