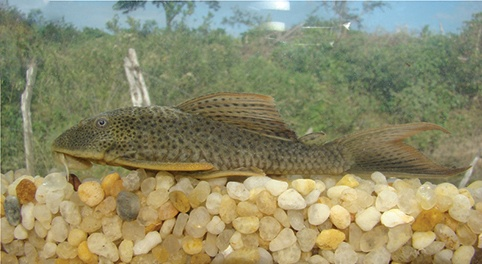

Conservation status
- Least Concern (IUCN 3.1)

Scientific classification
- Kingdom: Animalia
- Phylum: Chordata
- Class: Actinopterygii
- Order: Siluriformes
- Family: Loricariidae
- Genus: Hypostomus
- Species: H. pusarum

Binomial name
- Hypostomus pusarum (Starks, 1913)

Synonyms
- Plecostomus pusarum Starks, 1913; Plecostomus jaguribensis Fowler, 1915; Hypostomus jaguribensis (Fowler, 1915); Plecostomus carvalhoi Miranda-Ribeiro, 1937; Hypostomus carvalhoi (Miranda Ribeiro, 1937); Plecostomus nudiventris Fowler, 1941; Hypostomus nudiventris (Fowler, 1941); Plecostomus plecostomus papariae Fowler, 1941; Hypostomus papariae (Fowler, 1941); Ancistrus salgadae Fowler, 1941; Hypostomus salgadae (Fowler, 1941)

= Hypostomus pusarum =

Species of fish

Hypostomus pusarum is a species of catfish in the family Loricariidae. It is native to South America, where it occurs in the coastal drainages of northern Brazil, including the state of Ceará. The species reaches 20.3 cm (8 in) in total length and is believed to be a facultative air-breather.
