= Hypostomus maracaiboensis =

Scientific classification
- Kingdom: Animalia
- Phylum: Chordata
- Class: Actinopterygii
- Order: Siluriformes
- Family: Loricariidae
- Genus: Hypostomus
- Species: H. maracaiboensis

Binomial name
- Hypostomus maracaiboensis (Schultz, 1944)

Synonyms
- Hemiancistrus maracaiboensis

Species of catfish

Hypostomus maracaiboensis is a species of catfish in the family Loricariidae. It is native to South America, where it occurs in the Lake Maracaibo basin in Venezuela. The species feeds on algae and detritus, reaches 28.5 cm (11.2 inches) in total length, and is believed to be a facultative air-breather. The species was originally described by Leonard Peter Schultz in 1944 as a member of Hemiancistrus, and some sources continue to refer to it as such. In 2015, a taxonomic review conducted by Jonathan W. Armbruster (of Auburn University), David C. Werneke, and Milton Tan reclassified it and recognized it as a member of Hypostomus.
