= Hypostomus vaillanti =

Scientific classification
- Domain: Eukaryota
- Kingdom: Animalia
- Phylum: Chordata
- Class: Actinopterygii
- Order: Siluriformes
- Family: Loricariidae
- Genus: Hypostomus
- Species: H. vaillanti

Binomial name
- Hypostomus vaillanti (Steindachner, 1877)

Synonyms
- Plecostomus vaillanti

Species of fish

Hypostomus vaillanti is a species of catfish in the family Loricariidae. It is native to South America, where it occurs in the Preto River basin in the São Francisco River drainage. The species reaches 18.5 cm (7.3 inches) SL and is believed to be a facultative air-breather.

== Etymology ==
The fish is probably named in honor of French zoologist Léon Vaillant (1834–1914), of the Muséum national d’Histoire naturelle in Paris.
