= Hypostomus dardanelos =

Scientific classification
- Kingdom: Animalia
- Phylum: Chordata
- Class: Actinopterygii
- Division: Teleostei
- Order: Siluriformes
- Family: Loricariidae
- Genus: Hypostomus
- Species: H. dardanelos

Binomial name
- Hypostomus dardanelos Zawadzki & P. H. Carvalho, 2014

Species of catfish

Hypostomus dardanelos is a species of catfish in the family Loricariidae. Its type locality is stated to be the Praia Grande River, a tributary of the Aripuanã in the Brazilian state of Mato Grosso.

== Distribution ==
It is a freshwater fish native to South America, where it occurs in the Aripuanã River drainage in Brazil.

== Description ==
Hypostomus dardanelos was described in 2014 by Cláudio H. Zawadzki (of the State University of Maringá) and Pedro Hollanda Carvalho (of the Federal University of Rio de Janeiro) on the basis of its distinctive morphology and coloration. The species reaches 18.4 cm (7.2 inches) in standard length and is believed to be a facultative air-breather. It can be distinguished from many of its congeners by its distinct color pattern, being primarily orange or yellow with numerous small dark spots.
