= Hypostomus scabriceps =

Scientific classification
- Kingdom: Animalia
- Phylum: Chordata
- Class: Actinopterygii
- Order: Siluriformes
- Family: Loricariidae
- Genus: Hypostomus
- Species: H. scabriceps

Binomial name
- Hypostomus scabriceps (C. H. Eigenmann & R. S. Eigenmann, 1888)

Synonyms
- Plecostomus commersonii scabriceps

Species of fish

Hypostomus scabriceps is a species of catfish in the family Loricariidae. It is native to South America, where it occurs in the São Mateus River basin. The species reaches 35 cm (13.8 inches) in total length and is believed to be a facultative air-breather.
