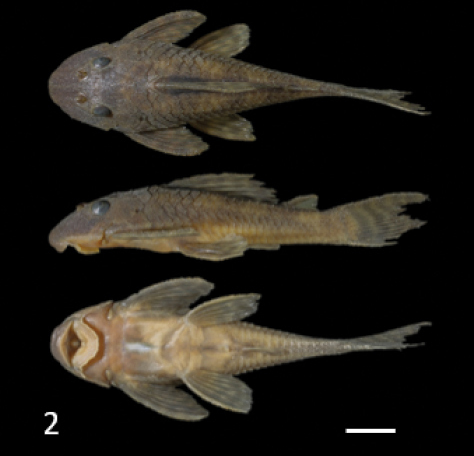
- specimen of Hypostomus fluviatilis scalebar = 1cm

Scientific classification
- Domain: Eukaryota
- Kingdom: Animalia
- Phylum: Chordata
- Class: Actinopterygii
- Order: Siluriformes
- Family: Loricariidae
- Genus: Hypostomus
- Species: H. fluviatilis

Binomial name
- Hypostomus fluviatilis (Schubart, 1964)

Synonyms
- Plecostomus fluviatilis

= Hypostomus fluviatilis =

Species of catfish

Hypostomus fluviatilis is a species of catfish in the family Loricariidae. It is a freshwater fish native to South America, where it occurs in the Rio Grande basin in the Paraná River drainage in Brazil, with its type locality being the Mojiguaçu River. The species reaches 16.5 cm (6.5 inches) in standard length and is believed to be a facultative air-breather.
