= Hypostomus nigromaculatus =

Scientific classification
- Domain: Eukaryota
- Kingdom: Animalia
- Phylum: Chordata
- Class: Actinopterygii
- Order: Siluriformes
- Family: Loricariidae
- Genus: Hypostomus
- Species: H. nigromaculatus

Binomial name
- Hypostomus nigromaculatus (Schubart, 1964)

Synonyms
- Plecostomus nigromaculatus

Species of catfish

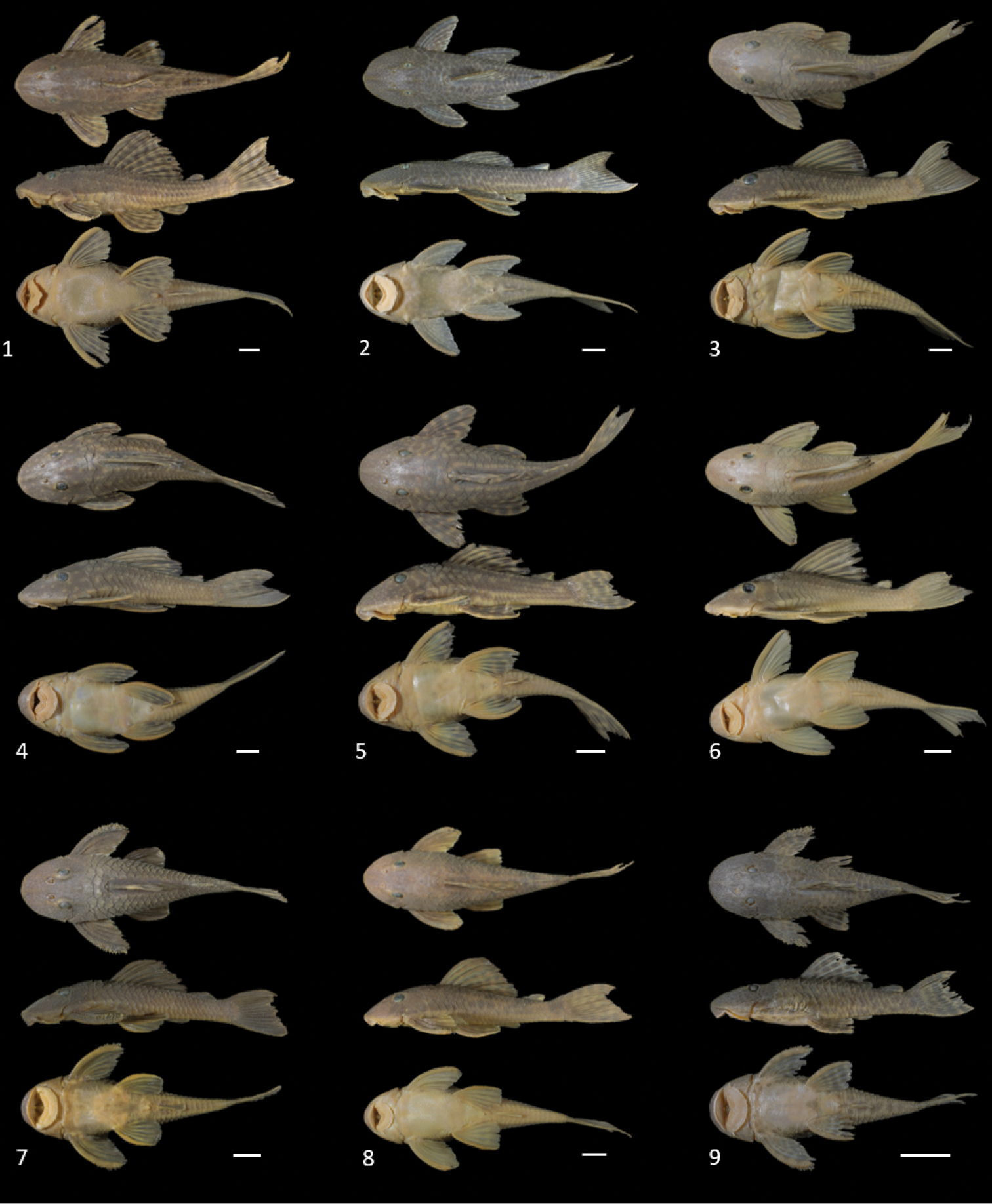
The loricariid labeled with the number 9 in this image is a specimen of Hypostomus nigromaculatus.

Hypostomus nigromaculatus is a species of catfish in the family Loricariidae. It is native to South America, where it occurs in the middle and upper Paraná River basin in Brazil. The species reaches 10.2 cm (4 inches) in standard length and is believed to be a facultative air-breather.

Hypostomus nigromaculatus sometimes appears in the aquarium trade, where it is typically referred to either as the dot pleco or by its associated L-number, which is LDA-012.
