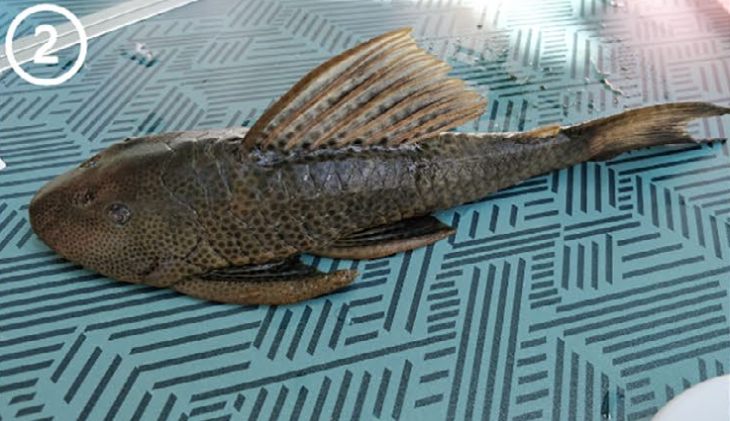
- Hypostomus robinii, caught in Martinique

Conservation status
- Least Concern (IUCN 3.1)

Scientific classification
- Kingdom: Animalia
- Phylum: Chordata
- Class: Actinopterygii
- Order: Siluriformes
- Family: Loricariidae
- Genus: Hypostomus
- Species: H. robinii

Binomial name
- Hypostomus robinii Valenciennes, 1840

Synonyms
- Hypostomus robini

= Hypostomus robinii =

Species of fish

Hypostomus robinii, commonly known as the teta, is a species of catfish in the family Loricariidae. It is native to the Caribbean, where it occurs in freshwater habitats on the island of Trinidad. It inhabits fast-flowing streams, where it feeds on periphyton.

The species reaches 16 cm (6.3 inches) in standard length. It can reach a weight of almost 350 grams (12 oz). This species, known in the vernacular as the "armored catfish" because of the bony plates on its body, is quite popular in the aquarium trade. Because of this, there have been several documented cases where the fish has been released into wild river systems. Female Hypostomus robinii can release upwards of 200 eggs during spawning, and as a result, the fish can rapidly take over water systems in short time periods. Researchers have developed a method to monitor this invasive aquatic species using environmental DNA samples.

== Etymology ==
The fish is named in honor of M. (Monsieur) Robin.
