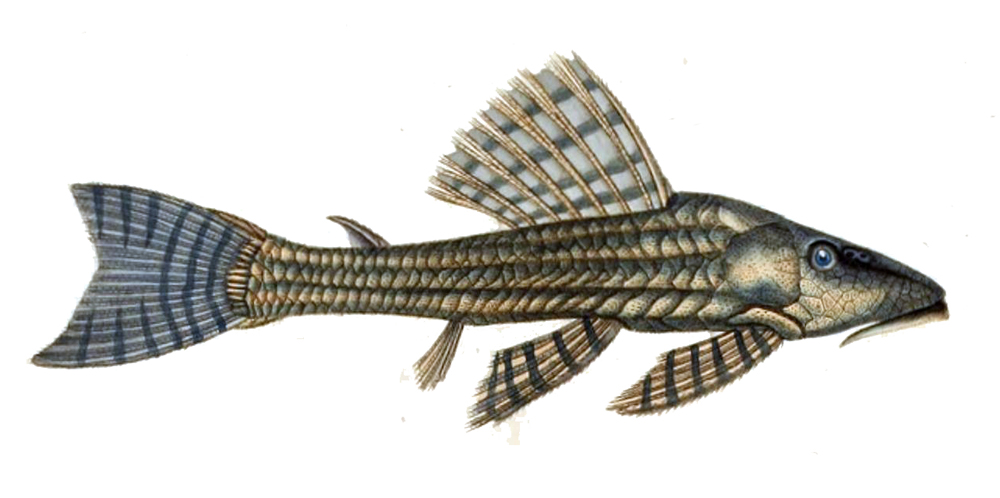

Scientific classification
- Kingdom: Animalia
- Phylum: Chordata
- Class: Actinopterygii
- Order: Siluriformes
- Family: Loricariidae
- Genus: Hypostomus
- Species: H. itacua

Binomial name
- Hypostomus itacua Valenciennes, 1836

Synonyms
- Hemiancistrus itacua

= Hypostomus itacua =

Species of fish

Hypostomus itacua is a species of catfish in the family Loricariidae. It is a freshwater fish native to South America, where it occurs in the middle Paraná River basin. The species reaches 11 cm (4.3 inches) in total length and is believed to be a facultative air-breather. The type specimen of the species is apparently lost and its classification within Loricariidae is uncertain. It is sometimes treated as a species of Hemiancistrus.
