= Hypostomus nudiventris =

Scientific classification
- Kingdom: Animalia
- Phylum: Chordata
- Class: Actinopterygii
- Order: Siluriformes
- Family: Loricariidae
- Genus: Hypostomus
- Species: H. nudiventris

Binomial name
- Hypostomus nudiventris (Fowler, 1941)

Synonyms
- Plecostomus nudiventris

Species of catfish

Hypostomus nudiventris is a species of catfish in the family Loricariidae. It is native to South America, where it occurs in coastal drainage basins of northern Brazil. The species reaches 5.7 centimetres (2.2 in) in standard length and is believed to be a facultative air-breather.
