= Hypostomus francisci =

Scientific classification
- Kingdom: Animalia
- Phylum: Chordata
- Class: Actinopterygii
- Order: Siluriformes
- Family: Loricariidae
- Genus: Hypostomus
- Species: H. francisci

Binomial name
- Hypostomus francisci (Lütken, 1874)

Synonyms
- Plecostomus francisci

Species of fish

Hypostomus francisci is a species of catfish in the family Loricariidae. It is native to South America, where it occurs in the upper São Francisco River basin. The species reaches 36 cm (14.2 inches) SL.
