= Hypostomus interruptus =

Scientific classification
- Kingdom: Animalia
- Phylum: Chordata
- Class: Actinopterygii
- Order: Siluriformes
- Family: Loricariidae
- Genus: Hypostomus
- Species: H. interruptus

Binomial name
- Hypostomus interruptus (Miranda-Ribeiro, 1918)

Synonyms
- Plecostomus interruptus

Species of catfish

Hypostomus interruptus is a species of catfish in the family Loricariidae. It is native to South America, where it occurs in the Ribeira de Iguape River basin in Brazil, with the type locality reportedly being the Juquiá River. The species reaches 12 cm (4.7 inches) in standard length and is believed to be a facultative air-breather.
