= Hypostomus crassicauda =

Scientific classification
- Kingdom: Animalia
- Phylum: Chordata
- Class: Actinopterygii
- Division: Teleostei
- Order: Siluriformes
- Family: Loricariidae
- Genus: Hypostomus
- Species: H. crassicauda

Binomial name
- Hypostomus crassicauda Boeseman, 1968

Species of fish

Hypostomus crassicauda is a species of catfish in the family Loricariidae. It is native to South America, where it occurs in the upper Sipaliwini River basin. The species reaches 14.3 cm (5.6 inches) SL and is believed to be a facultative air-breather.
