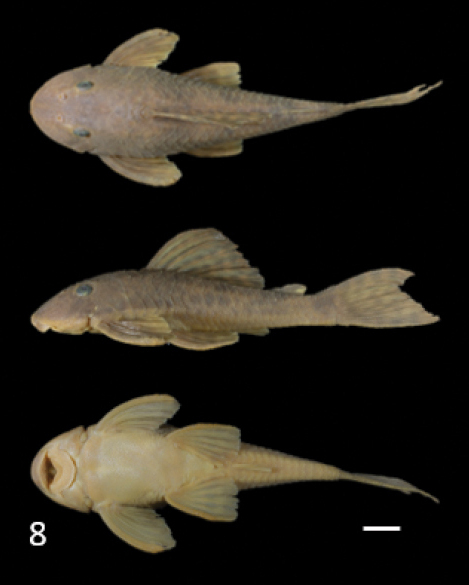
- Specimen from the Uberaba River, Paraná. Scale bar 10 mm.

Scientific classification
- Domain: Eukaryota
- Kingdom: Animalia
- Phylum: Chordata
- Class: Actinopterygii
- Order: Siluriformes
- Family: Loricariidae
- Genus: Hypostomus
- Species: H. topavae

Binomial name
- Hypostomus topavae (Godoy, 1969)

Synonyms
- Plecostomus topavae

= Hypostomus topavae =

Species of catfish

Hypostomus topavae is a species of catfish in the family Loricariidae. It is native to South America, where it occurs in the Paraná River drainage, including the Rio Grande basin. The species is very large for a loricariid, reaching 70 cm (27.6 inches) SL.
