= Hypostomus varimaculosus =

Scientific classification
- Kingdom: Animalia
- Phylum: Chordata
- Class: Actinopterygii
- Order: Siluriformes
- Family: Loricariidae
- Genus: Hypostomus
- Species: H. varimaculosus

Binomial name
- Hypostomus varimaculosus (Fowler, 1945)

Synonyms
- Plecostomus varimaculosus

Species of catfish

Hypostomus varimaculosus is a species of catfish in the family Loricariidae. It is native to South America, where it occurs in the upper Japurá River basin in Brazil and Colombia. The species reaches 6 cm (2.4 inches) in standard length and is believed to be a facultative air-breather.
