= Hypostomus unae =

Scientific classification
- Kingdom: Animalia
- Phylum: Chordata
- Class: Actinopterygii
- Division: Teleostei
- Order: Siluriformes
- Family: Loricariidae
- Genus: Hypostomus
- Species: H. unae

Binomial name
- Hypostomus unae (Steindachner, 1878)

Synonyms
- Plecostomus unae

Species of catfish

Hypostomus unae is a species of catfish in the family Loricariidae. It is native to South America, where it occurs in the Una River basin in the state of Bahia in Brazil. The species reaches 18.3 cm (7.2 inches) SL and is believed to be a facultative air-breather.
