= Hypostomus hoplonites =

Scientific classification
- Kingdom: Animalia
- Phylum: Chordata
- Class: Actinopterygii
- Division: Teleostei
- Order: Siluriformes
- Family: Loricariidae
- Genus: Hypostomus
- Species: H. hoplonites

Binomial name
- Hypostomus hoplonites Rapp Py-Daniel, 1988

Species of catfish

Hypostomus hoplonites is a species of catfish in the family Loricariidae. It is native to South America, where it occurs in the middle Amazon River basin in Brazil, with the type locality reportedly given as the Solimões River. The species reaches 32.5 cm (12.8 inches) in standard length and is believed to be a facultative air-breather.
