= Hypostomus angipinnatus =

Conservation status
- Data Deficient (IUCN 3.1)

Scientific classification
- Kingdom: Animalia
- Phylum: Chordata
- Class: Actinopterygii
- Division: Teleostei
- Order: Siluriformes
- Family: Loricariidae
- Genus: Hypostomus
- Species: H. angipinnatus

Binomial name
- Hypostomus angipinnatus (Leege, 1922)

Synonyms
- Plecostomus angipinnatus Leege, 1922

Species of catfish

Hypostomus angipinnatus is a species of freshwater ray-finned fish belonging to the family Loricariidae, the suckermouth armored catfishes, and the subfamily Hypostominae, the suckermouth catfishes. This catfish is known only from its holotype, with the type locality given rather imprecisely as Mato Grosso, Brazil. This holotype was stored in the Phyletisches Museum in Jena, Germany, but is currently lost. The holotype is known to have been 15 cm (5.9 in) long.
