= Hypostomus oculeus =

Scientific classification
- Kingdom: Animalia
- Phylum: Chordata
- Class: Actinopterygii
- Order: Siluriformes
- Family: Loricariidae
- Genus: Hypostomus
- Species: H. oculeus

Binomial name
- Hypostomus oculeus (Fowler, 1943)

Synonyms
- Cochliodon oculeus; Panaque oculeus

Species of catfish

Hypostomus oculeus is a species of catfish in the family Loricariidae. It is native to South America, where it occurs in the upper Japurá River basin in Colombia. The species reaches 21.7 cm (8.5 inches) in standard length and is believed to be a facultative air-breather.
