= Hypostomus pseudohemiurus =

Scientific classification
- Kingdom: Animalia
- Phylum: Chordata
- Class: Actinopterygii
- Order: Siluriformes
- Family: Loricariidae
- Genus: Hypostomus
- Species: H. pseudohemiurus

Binomial name
- Hypostomus pseudohemiurus Boeseman, 1968

Species of catfish

Hypostomus pseudohemiurus is a species of catfish in the family Loricariidae. It is native to South America, where it occurs in the Courantyne River basin in Suriname. The species reaches 6.2 cm (2.4 inches) in standard length and is believed to be a facultative air-breather.
