= Hypostomus pantherinus =

Scientific classification
- Kingdom: Animalia
- Phylum: Chordata
- Class: Actinopterygii
- Order: Siluriformes
- Family: Loricariidae
- Genus: Hypostomus
- Species: H. pantherinus

Binomial name
- Hypostomus pantherinus Kner, 1854

Species of catfish

Hypostomus pantherinus is a species of catfish in the family Loricariidae. It is native to South America, where it occurs in the Madeira River basin in Brazil. The species reaches at least 4.8 cm (1.9 inches) in standard length and is believed to be a facultative air-breather. Although originally described by Rudolf Kner in 1854 based on a single specimen from the Guaporé River basin in Brazil, Hypostomus pantherinus was redescribed in 2021 and its range was found to also include Bolivia.
