= Hypostomus plecostomoides =

Scientific classification
- Kingdom: Animalia
- Phylum: Chordata
- Class: Actinopterygii
- Order: Siluriformes
- Family: Loricariidae
- Genus: Hypostomus
- Species: H. plecostomoides

Binomial name
- Hypostomus plecostomoides (C. H. Eigenmann, 1922)

Synonyms
- Cochliodon plecostomoides

Species of catfish

Hypostomus plecostomoides is a species of catfish in the family Loricariidae. It is native to South America, where it occurs in the Meta River basin in Colombia. The species reaches 25.6 cm (10.1 inches) in total length and is believed to be a facultative air-breather. Its specific epithet, plecostomoides, may refer to perceived similarity between it and the species Hypostomus plecostomus, which it does not overlap with in distribution, although it may also refer to the now-invalid genus Plecostomus.

Hypostomus plecostomoides appears in the aquarium trade, where it is typically referred to either as the brown pleco or by one of two associated L-numbers, which are LDA-038 and LDA-042.
