= Hypostomus variostictus =

Scientific classification
- Kingdom: Animalia
- Phylum: Chordata
- Class: Actinopterygii
- Order: Siluriformes
- Family: Loricariidae
- Genus: Hypostomus
- Species: H. variostictus

Binomial name
- Hypostomus variostictus (Miranda-Ribeiro, 1912)

Synonyms
- Plecostomus variostictus

Species of catfish

Hypostomus variostictus is a species of catfish in the family Loricariidae. It is native to South America, where it occurs in the upper Paraguay River basin in Argentina and Brazil. The species reaches 5.7 cm (2.2 inches) in total length and is believed to be a facultative air-breather.
