= Hypostomus tietensis =

Conservation status
- Data Deficient (IUCN 3.1)

Scientific classification
- Kingdom: Animalia
- Phylum: Chordata
- Class: Actinopterygii
- Order: Siluriformes
- Family: Loricariidae
- Genus: Hypostomus
- Species: H. tietensis

Binomial name
- Hypostomus tietensis (Ihering, 1905)

Synonyms
- Plecostomus tietensis

Species of catfish

Hypostomus tietensis is a species of catfish in the family Loricariidae. It is native to South America, where it occurs in the Tietê River basin in Brazil, for which it is named. The species reaches 12.5 cm (4.9 in) in standard length and is believed to be a facultative air-breather.

In 2022, Hypostomus tietensis was found to comprise several genetically distinct populations that likely represent multiple cryptic species.
