= Hypostomus atropinnis =

Conservation status
- Data Deficient (IUCN 3.1)

Scientific classification
- Kingdom: Animalia
- Phylum: Chordata
- Class: Actinopterygii
- Division: Teleostei
- Order: Siluriformes
- Family: Loricariidae
- Genus: Hypostomus
- Species: H. atropinnis

Binomial name
- Hypostomus atropinnis (C. H. Eigenmann & R. S. Eigenmann, 1890)

Synonyms
- Plecostomus lima atropinnis C. H. Eigenmann & R. S. Eigenmann, 1890

South American catfish species

Hypostomus atropinnis is a species of freshwater ray-finned fish belonging to the family Loricariidae, the suckermouth armored catfishes, and the subfamily Hypostominae, the suckermouth catfishes.

This catfish is endemic to Brazil, where it is known only from its type locality in the upper Vermelho River, in the Araguaia River basin in Goiás. There are no records of this species in museum collections. Its taxonomic status is considered to be in need of review.

This species reaches a standard length of 21 cm (8.3 in). Species within the genus Hypostomus are thought to be facultative air breathers.
