= Hypostomus tenuis =

Scientific classification
- Kingdom: Animalia
- Phylum: Chordata
- Class: Actinopterygii
- Order: Siluriformes
- Family: Loricariidae
- Genus: Hypostomus
- Species: H. tenuis

Binomial name
- Hypostomus tenuis Boeseman, 1968

Synonyms
- Squaliforma tenuis

Species of catfish

Hypostomus tenuis is a species of catfish in the family Loricariidae. It is native to South America, where it occurs in the Suriname River basin. The species reaches 19.5 cm (7.7 inches) SL and is believed to be a facultative air-breather. FishBase lists this species as a member of Squaliforma, a genus that is under dispute.
