= Hypostomus meleagris =

Scientific classification
- Kingdom: Animalia
- Phylum: Chordata
- Class: Actinopterygii
- Division: Teleostei
- Order: Siluriformes
- Family: Loricariidae
- Genus: Hypostomus
- Species: H. meleagris

Binomial name
- Hypostomus meleagris (Marini, Nichols & La Monte, 1933)

Synonyms
- Plecostomus meleagris

Species of fish

Hypostomus meleagris is a species of catfish in the family Loricariidae. It is native to South America, where it occurs in the upper and middle Paraná River basin. The species reaches 30 cm (11.8 inches) SL and is believed to be a facultative air-breather.
