= Hypostomus surinamensis =

Scientific classification
- Kingdom: Animalia
- Phylum: Chordata
- Class: Actinopterygii
- Order: Siluriformes
- Family: Loricariidae
- Genus: Hypostomus
- Species: H. surinamensis

Binomial name
- Hypostomus surinamensis Boeseman, 1968

Species of catfish

Hypostomus surinamensis is a species of catfish in the family Loricariidae. It is native to South America, where it occurs in the Suriname River basin in Suriname, with its specific epithet indicating both the country and river system it can be found in. The species reaches 16.5 cm (6.5 inches) in standard length and is believed to be a facultative air-breather.
