= Hypostomus aspilogaster =

Conservation status
- Least Concern (IUCN 3.1)

Scientific classification
- Kingdom: Animalia
- Phylum: Chordata
- Class: Actinopterygii
- Division: Teleostei
- Order: Siluriformes
- Family: Loricariidae
- Genus: Hypostomus
- Species: H. aspilogaster

Binomial name
- Hypostomus aspilogaster (Cope, 1894)

Synonyms
- Plecostomus aspilogaster Cope, 1894

Species of catfish

Hypostomus aspilogaster, the Jacuhy pleco, is a species of freshwater ray-finned fish belonging to the family Loricariidae, the suckermouth armored catfishes, and the subfamily Hypostominae, the suckermouth catfishes. This catfish is found in Argentina, Brazil and Uruguay in the Uruguay River and Lagoa dos Patos drainage systems. This species reaches a standard length of 26.5 cm (10.4 in) and is thought to be a facultative air breather.
