= Hypostomus paucimaculatus =

Scientific classification
- Kingdom: Animalia
- Phylum: Chordata
- Class: Actinopterygii
- Order: Siluriformes
- Family: Loricariidae
- Genus: Hypostomus
- Species: H. paucimaculatus

Binomial name
- Hypostomus paucimaculatus Boeseman, 1968

Species of catfish

Hypostomus paucimaculatus is a species of catfish in the family Loricariidae. It is native to South America, where it occurs in the upper and middle Suriname River basin in Suriname. The species reaches 12 cm (4.7 inches) in standard length and is believed to be a facultative air-breather.
