= Hypostomus pyrineusi =

Scientific classification
- Domain: Eukaryota
- Kingdom: Animalia
- Phylum: Chordata
- Class: Actinopterygii
- Order: Siluriformes
- Family: Loricariidae
- Genus: Hypostomus
- Species: H. pyrineusi

Binomial name
- Hypostomus pyrineusi (A. Miranda-Ribeiro, 1920)

Synonyms
- Cochliodon pyrineusi

Species of catfish

Hypostomus pyrineusi is a species of catfish in the family Loricariidae. It is native to South America, where it reportedly occurs in the Madeira River basin in Brazil. The species reaches 26 cm (10.2 inches) in total length and is believed to be a facultative air-breather.

== Etymology ==
The fish is named in honor of Lieut. Antonio Pyrineus de Souza (d. 1936), a naturalist with the Rondon Commission, whose mission was to install telegraph poles from Mato Grosso to Amazonas, which included an expedition that collected the type specimen.
