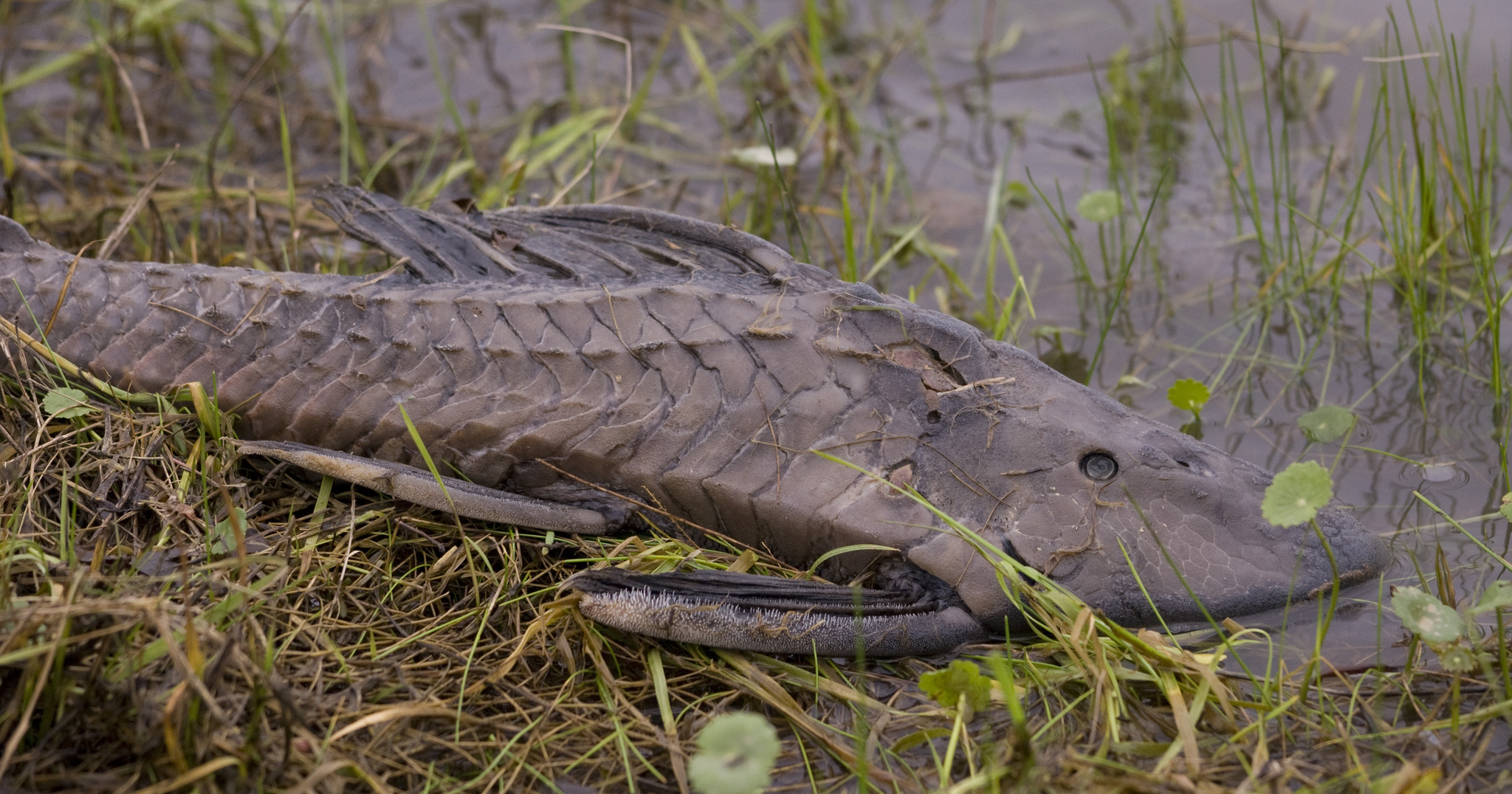

Scientific classification
- Kingdom: Animalia
- Phylum: Chordata
- Class: Actinopterygii
- Division: Teleostei
- Order: Siluriformes
- Family: Loricariidae
- Genus: Hypostomus
- Species: H. laplatae

Binomial name
- Hypostomus laplatae (Eigenmann, 1907)

Synonyms
- List: Plecostomus laplatae; Plecostomus taeniatus; Hypostomus taeniatus; Plecostomus rachovii; Hypostomus rachovii; Hypostomus commersonoides

= Hypostomus laplatae =

Species of fish

Hypostomus laplatae is a species of catfish in the family Loricariidae. It is native to South America, where it occurs in the Río de la Plata basin. Specimens of H. laplatae have been collected from two rivers, both of which are reported to have sandy substrates and moderate current.

The water in which H. laplatae can be found typically has a temperature of 15.3 to 20.4 °C (59.5 to 68.7 °F), a turbidity of 260 to 392 NTU, a pH of 7.8 to 8.1, an oxygen concentration of 5.4 to 7.4 mg/L, and a conductivity of 543 to 2,435 μS/cm.

H. laplatae is a very large loricariid, reaching 69 cm (27.2 inches) in total length. It sometimes appears in the aquarium trade, where it is often referred to as the La Plata pleco.
