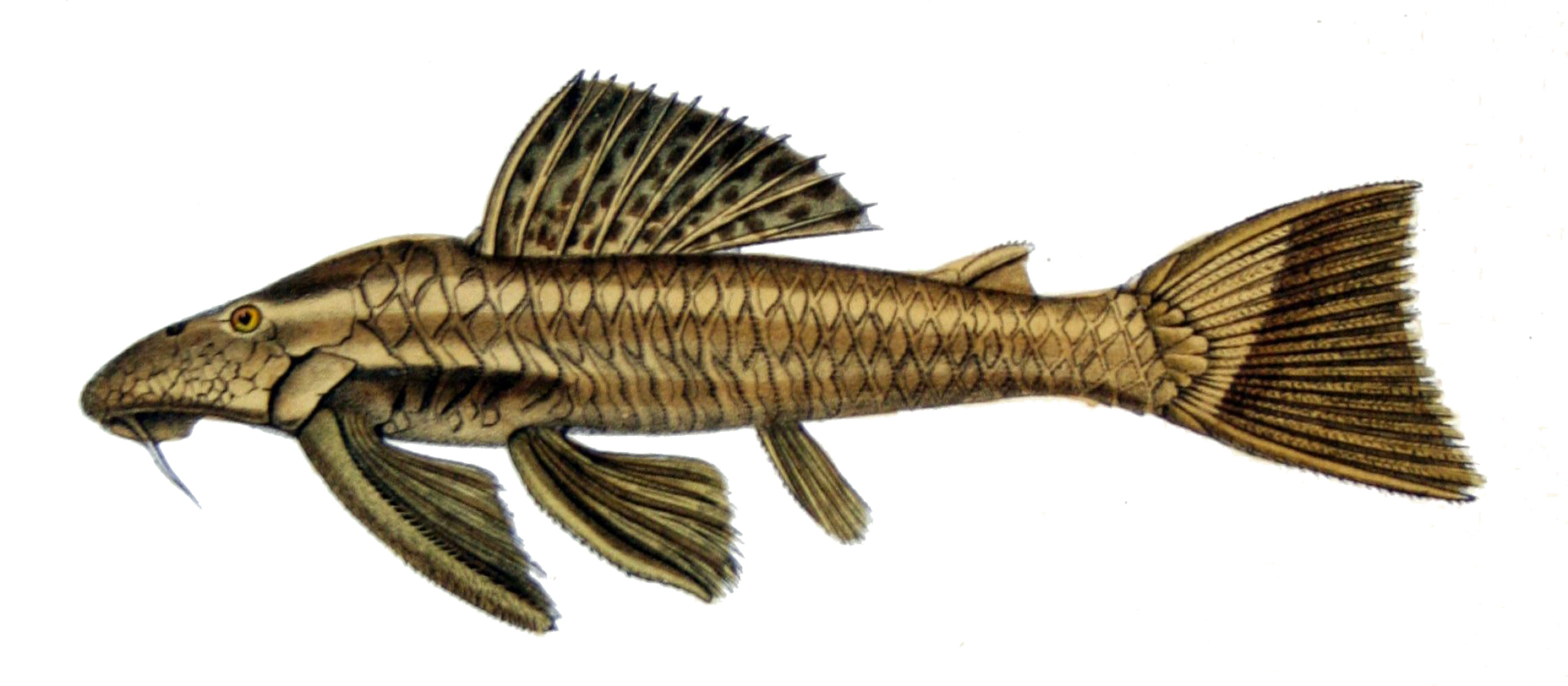

Conservation status
- Data Deficient (IUCN 3.1)

Scientific classification
- Kingdom: Animalia
- Phylum: Chordata
- Class: Actinopterygii
- Division: Teleostei
- Order: Siluriformes
- Family: Loricariidae
- Genus: Hypostomus
- Species: H. asperatus

Binomial name
- Hypostomus asperatus Castelnau, 1855

= Hypostomus asperatus =

Species of fish

Hypostomus asperatus is a species of freshwater ray-finned fish belonging to the family Loricariidae, the suckermouth armored catfishes, and the subfamily Hypostominae, the suckermouth catfishes. This catfish is endemic to Brazil, where it is only known from the Araguaia River basin in the state of Goiás. There have been no records of this species since it was described. This species reaches a standard length of 22.9 cm (9.0 in) and is believed to be a facultative air-breather.
