= Hypostomus piratatu =

Scientific classification
- Domain: Eukaryota
- Kingdom: Animalia
- Phylum: Chordata
- Class: Actinopterygii
- Order: Siluriformes
- Family: Loricariidae
- Genus: Hypostomus
- Species: H. piratatu

Binomial name
- Hypostomus piratatu Weber, 1986

Species of catfish

Hypostomus piratatu is a species of catfish in the family Loricariidae. It is native to South America, where it occurs in eastern tributaries of the Paraguay River in Argentina and Paraguay. The species reaches 27.5 cm (10.8 inches) in standard length and is believed to be a facultative air-breather.
