= Hypostomus weberi =

Conservation status
- Least Concern (IUCN 3.1)

Scientific classification
- Kingdom: Animalia
- Phylum: Chordata
- Class: Actinopterygii
- Order: Siluriformes
- Family: Loricariidae
- Genus: Hypostomus
- Species: H. weberi

Binomial name
- Hypostomus weberi P. H. Carvalho, F. C. T. Lima & Zawadzki, 2010

Species of fish

Hypostomus weberi is a species of catfish in the family Loricariidae. It is native to South America, where it occurs in the middle Rio Negro in Brazil. One record of the species' occurrence refers to a "río Cicipa", which is thought to possibly correspond with the Siapa River, a tributary of the Casiquiare in Venezuela. The species is typically found in rapids or flooded forest environments. It reaches 6.9 inches (17.5 cm) SL and is known to feed on detritus. Its specific epithet, weberi, honors Claude Weber of the Natural History Museum of Geneva, for his contributions to knowledge of the genus Hypostomus.

== Etymology ==
The fish is named in honor of Claude Weber, of the Muséum d'Histoire Naturelle de Génève, because of his contributions to the knowledge of the genus.

== Aquarium ==
H. weberi sometimes appears in the aquarium trade, where it is frequently referred to either as Weber's pleco or by its associated L-number, which is L-167.
