= Hypostomus affinis =

Conservation status
- Least Concern (IUCN 3.1)

Scientific classification
- Kingdom: Animalia
- Phylum: Chordata
- Class: Actinopterygii
- Division: Teleostei
- Order: Siluriformes
- Family: Loricariidae
- Genus: Hypostomus
- Species: H. affinis

Binomial name
- Hypostomus affinis (Steindachner, 1877)

Synonyms
- Plecostomus affinis Steindachner, 1877

Species of fish

Hypostomus affinis is a species of freshwater ray-finned fish belonging to the family Loricariidae, the suckermouth armored catfishes, and the subfamily Hypostominae, the suckermouth catfishes. This catfish is endemic to Brazil where it is found in the Paraíba do Sul river basin and coastal drainages from southern Espírito Santo to the Doce River. H. affinis is typically seen in areas of varied width and flow speed, with a substrate of rocks and sand. Juveniles of the species are often seen within riparian vegetation near riverbanks. It is believed to display facultative air-breathing and asynchronous ovarian development, with oocytes of all stages being present simultaneously.This species reaches a standard length of 39.7 cm (15.6 in).
