= Hypostomus carinatus =

Conservation status
- Least Concern (IUCN 3.1)

Scientific classification
- Kingdom: Animalia
- Phylum: Chordata
- Class: Actinopterygii
- Division: Teleostei
- Order: Siluriformes
- Family: Loricariidae
- Genus: Hypostomus
- Species: H. carinatus

Binomial name
- Hypostomus carinatus (Steindachner, 1881)

Synonyms
- Plecostomus carinatus Steindachner, 1881

Species of catfish

Hypostomus carinatus is a species of freshwater ray-finned fish belonging to the family Loricariidae, the suckermouth armored catfishes, and the subfamily Hypostominae, the suckermouth catfishes. This catfish has a wide distribution in the Amazon River basin in Bolivia, Brazil, Colombia and Peru. This species reaches a standard length of 24.8 cm (9.8 in) and is believed to be a facultative air-breather.

H. carinatus appears in the aquarium trade, where it is usually referred to either as the blackspotted orange pleco or by its associated L-number, which is L-166.
