= Hypostomus nigropunctatus =

Scientific classification
- Kingdom: Animalia
- Phylum: Chordata
- Class: Actinopterygii
- Order: Siluriformes
- Family: Loricariidae
- Genus: Hypostomus
- Species: H. nigropunctatus

Binomial name
- Hypostomus nigropunctatus Garavello, Britski & Zawadzki, 2012

Species of catfish

Hypostomus nigropunctatus is a species of catfish in the family Loricariidae. It is native to South America, where it occurs in the Iguazu River in the state of Paraná in Brazil. The species reaches 23.3 cm (9.2 in) in standard length and is believed to be a facultative air-breather.
