= Hypostomus holostictus =

Scientific classification
- Kingdom: Animalia
- Phylum: Chordata
- Class: Actinopterygii
- Order: Siluriformes
- Family: Loricariidae
- Genus: Hypostomus
- Species: H. holostictus

Binomial name
- Hypostomus holostictus (Regan, 1913)

Synonyms
- Hemiancistrus holostictus

Species of catfish

Hypostomus holostictus is a species of catfish in the family Loricariidae. It is a freshwater fish native to South America, where it occurs in the San Juan River basin in Colombia. The species reaches 18 cm (7.1 inches) in total length and is believed to be a facultative air-breather. It was originally described in 1913 by Charles Tate Regan as a species of Hemiancistrus, and it is still sometimes referred to by the name Hemiancistrus holostictus.
