= Hypostomus paulinus =

Conservation status
- Least Concern (IUCN 3.1)

Scientific classification
- Kingdom: Animalia
- Phylum: Chordata
- Class: Actinopterygii
- Order: Siluriformes
- Family: Loricariidae
- Genus: Hypostomus
- Species: H. paulinus

Binomial name
- Hypostomus paulinus (Ihering, 1905)

Synonyms
- Plecostomus paulinus

Species of fish

Hypostomus paulinus is a species of catfish in the family Loricariidae. It is native to South America, where it occurs in the Tietê River basin. The species reaches 13.5 cm (5.3 in) SL and is believed to be a facultative air-breather.
