= Hypostomus lima =

Scientific classification
- Kingdom: Animalia
- Phylum: Chordata
- Class: Actinopterygii
- Order: Siluriformes
- Family: Loricariidae
- Genus: Hypostomus
- Species: H. lima

Binomial name
- Hypostomus lima (Lütken, 1874)

Synonyms
- Plecostomus lima

Species of fish

Hypostomus lima is a species of catfish in the family Loricariidae. It is native to South America, where it occurs in the São Francisco River basin. The species reaches 13.6 cm (5.4 inches) SL and is believed to be a facultative air-breather.
