= Hypostomus longiradiatus =

Scientific classification
- Kingdom: Animalia
- Phylum: Chordata
- Class: Actinopterygii
- Order: Siluriformes
- Family: Loricariidae
- Genus: Hypostomus
- Species: H. longiradiatus

Binomial name
- Hypostomus longiradiatus (Holly, 1929)

Synonyms
- Plecostomus longiradiatus

Species of catfish

Hypostomus longiradiatus is a species of catfish in the family Loricariidae. It is native to South America, where it occurs in the Guamá River basin in Brazil. The species reaches 39.5 cm (15.6 in) in total length and is believed to be a facultative air-breather.
