= Hypostomus macrophthalmus =

Scientific classification
- Kingdom: Animalia
- Phylum: Chordata
- Class: Actinopterygii
- Order: Siluriformes
- Family: Loricariidae
- Genus: Hypostomus
- Species: H. macrophthalmus

Binomial name
- Hypostomus macrophthalmus Boeseman, 1968

Synonyms
- Hypostomus pseudohemiurus macrophthalmus

Species of catfish

Hypostomus macrophthalmus is a species of catfish in the family Loricariidae. It is native to South America, where it occurs in the Sipaliwini River basin in Suriname. The species reaches 7.9 cm (3.1 in) in standard length and is believed to be a facultative air-breather.
