= Hypostomus agna =

Conservation status
- Least Concern (IUCN 3.1)

Scientific classification
- Kingdom: Animalia
- Phylum: Chordata
- Class: Actinopterygii
- Division: Teleostei
- Order: Siluriformes
- Family: Loricariidae
- Genus: Hypostomus
- Species: H. agna

Binomial name
- Hypostomus agna (A. Miranda-Ribeiro, 1907)

Synonyms
- Plecostomus agna A. Miranda-Ribeiro, 1907

Species of fish

Hypostomus agna is a species of freshwater ray-finned fish belonging to the family Loricariidae, the suckermouth armored catfishes, and the subfamily Hypostominae, the suckermouth catfishes. This catfish is endemic to Brazil, where it occurs in the Ribeira de Iguape River basin in the states of Santa Catarina and São Paulo. It was formally described as a new species in 1907 by Brazilian ichthyologist Alípio de Miranda-Ribeiro, as a species of Plecostomus.

The species reaches 22 cm (8.7 inches) in total length and is thought to be a facultative air-breather. Its keels are absent or poorly developed. The caudal peduncle has a trapezoidal shape in cross-section. These two features are used to distinguish it between closely related species also present in the Ribeira de Iguape river basin.
