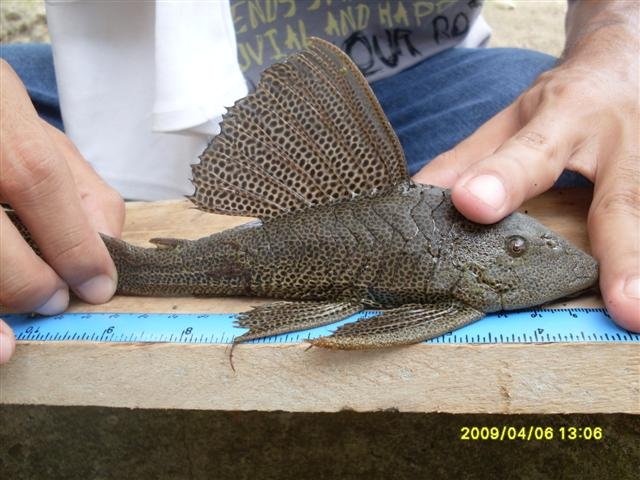

Conservation status
- Vulnerable (IUCN 3.1)

Scientific classification
- Kingdom: Animalia
- Phylum: Chordata
- Class: Actinopterygii
- Order: Siluriformes
- Family: Loricariidae
- Genus: Hypostomus
- Species: H. wilsoni

Binomial name
- Hypostomus wilsoni (C. H. Eigenmann, 1918)

Synonyms
- Hemiancistrus wilsoni

= Hypostomus wilsoni =

Species of Actinopterygii

Hypostomus wilsoni is a species of catfish in the family Loricariidae. It is native to South America, where it occurs in the basin of the Truando River, which is part of the Atrato River drainage in Colombia. The species reaches 12.8 inches (32.5 cm) in total length and is believed to be a facultative air-breather.

== Etymology ==
The fsh is named in honor of the businessman Charles Wilson of Indianapolis, Indiana, USA, who helped finance Eigenmann's trip to Brazil and collected many specimens himself, including the holotype of this species.
