= Hypostomus brevis =

Conservation status
- Data Deficient (IUCN 3.1)

Scientific classification
- Kingdom: Animalia
- Phylum: Chordata
- Class: Actinopterygii
- Division: Teleostei
- Order: Siluriformes
- Family: Loricariidae
- Genus: Hypostomus
- Species: H. brevis

Binomial name
- Hypostomus brevis (Nichols, 1919)

Synonyms
- Plecostomus brevis Nichols, 1919

Species of catfish

Hypostomus brevis is a species of freshwater ray-finned fish belonging to the family Loricariidae, the suckermouth armored catfishes, and the subfamily Hypostominae, the suckermouth catfishes. There is little information about the distribution, population and biology of this catfish. Its type material was given the imprecise type locality of the State of São Paulo, with subsequent unconfirmed reports in the Upper Paraná basin. This species reaches a standard length of 7.4 cm (2.9 in) and is believed to be a facultative air-breather.

== Taxonomy ==
Hypostomus brevis was first formally described by John Treadwell Nichols in 1919, as a species of Plecostomus; the type specimen was collected from the Mata Atlântica bioregion in São Paulo. The type is held at the American Museum of Natural History. The taxon was transferred to the genus Hypostomus in 1980 by Isaäc J. H. Isbrücker.
