= Hypostomus leucophaeus =

Scientific classification
- Kingdom: Animalia
- Phylum: Chordata
- Class: Actinopterygii
- Order: Siluriformes
- Family: Loricariidae
- Genus: Hypostomus
- Species: H. leucophaeus

Binomial name
- Hypostomus leucophaeus Zanata & Pitanga, 2016

Species of catfish

Hypostomus leucophaeus is a species of catfish in the family Loricariidae. It is native to South America, where it occurs in the Itapicuru River basin in the state of Bahia in Brazil. It is typically seen in stretches of rivers up to 50 m (160 ft) (164 ft) wide and 1.8 m (5.9 ft) deep, with clear water, rocky substrates, moderate to fast current, and an altitude of 38 to 449 m (125 to 1,473 ft) above sea level. The species reaches 15.8 cm (6.2 in) in standard length. Its specific epithet, leucophaeus, is derived from Latin and means "ash-colored", in reference to the general coloration and patterning of the species.
