= Hypostomus rhantos =

Scientific classification
- Kingdom: Animalia
- Phylum: Chordata
- Class: Actinopterygii
- Division: Teleostei
- Order: Siluriformes
- Family: Loricariidae
- Genus: Hypostomus
- Species: H. rhantos

Binomial name
- Hypostomus rhantos Armbruster, Tansey & Lujan, 2007

Species of fish

Hypostomus rhantos is a species of catfish in the family Loricariidae. It is native to South America, where it occurs in the Ventuari River as well as the upper Orinoco, ranging from above Puerto Ayacucho to the Casiquiare in Venezuela. The species reaches 19.6 cm (7.7 inches) SL. Its specific epithet, rhantos, derives from a Greek word meaning "speckled" and refers to the species' pattern of small spots.

H. rhantos occasionally appears in the aquarium trade, where it is typically referred to either as the coffee-ground pleco or by its associated L-number, which is L-242.
