= Hypostomus argus =

Conservation status
- Least Concern (IUCN 3.1)

Scientific classification
- Kingdom: Animalia
- Phylum: Chordata
- Class: Actinopterygii
- Division: Teleostei
- Order: Siluriformes
- Family: Loricariidae
- Genus: Hypostomus
- Species: H. argus

Binomial name
- Hypostomus argus (Fowler, 1943)

Synonyms
- Plecostomus argus Fowler, 1943

Species of catfish

Hypostomus argus is a species of freshwater ray-finned fish belonging to the family Loricariidae, the suckermouth armored catfishes, and the subfamily Hypostominae, the suckermouth catfishes. This catfish is found in the Orinoco River drainage of Colombia and Venezuela, as well as the Lake Valencia and Tocuyo River basins in Venezuela. However, there are two distinct populations which differ in jaw morphology. H. argus sensu stricto is found in the foothills of the Andes, and the fishes from the rest of the range are likely to be an undescribed species. This species reaches a standard length of 11.6 cm (4.6 in) and is believed to be a facultative air-breather.
