= Hypostomus multidens =

Scientific classification
- Kingdom: Animalia
- Phylum: Chordata
- Class: Actinopterygii
- Order: Siluriformes
- Family: Loricariidae
- Genus: Hypostomus
- Species: H. multidens

Binomial name
- Hypostomus multidens Jerep, Shibatta & Zawadzki, 2007

Species of catfish

Hypostomus multidens is a species of catfish in the family Loricariidae. It is native to South America, where it occurs in the basins of the Paranapanema River and the Paraná River in Brazil. It is typically seen in large rivers, where it usually occurs at low population densities. The species reaches 19.8 cm (7.8 inches) SL and is believed to be a facultative air-breather. Its specific epithet, multidens, refers to the species' distinctively high number of teeth, with individuals of H. multidens possessing between 122 and 267 teeth per mandibular ramus.
