= Hypostomus formosae =

Scientific classification
- Kingdom: Animalia
- Phylum: Chordata
- Class: Actinopterygii
- Order: Siluriformes
- Family: Loricariidae
- Genus: Hypostomus
- Species: H. formosae

Binomial name
- Hypostomus formosae Cardoso, Brancolini, Paracampo, Lizzaralde, Covain & Montoya-Burgos, 2016

Fish species

Hypostomus formosae is a species of catfish in the family Loricariidae. It is a freshwater species native to South America, where it occurs in the Paraguay River basin. The species reaches at least 24.9 cm (9.8 inches) SL.

H. formosae was described in 2016 by Yamila Paula Cardoso, Florencia Brancolini, Ariel Paracampo, Marta Lizarralde, Raphael Covain, and Juan I. Montoya-Burgos alongside a redescription of its congener Hypostomus boulengeri based on morphological and molecular analyses. FishBase does not list this species.

The species' specific epithet, formosae, refers to Formosa Province in Argentina, not to Taiwan, unlike some species bearing the same specific epithet (such as Dendrocitta formosae).
