= Hypostomus ternetzi =

Scientific classification
- Domain: Eukaryota
- Kingdom: Animalia
- Phylum: Chordata
- Class: Actinopterygii
- Order: Siluriformes
- Family: Loricariidae
- Genus: Hypostomus
- Species: H. ternetzi

Binomial name
- Hypostomus ternetzi (Boulenger, 1895)

Synonyms
- Plecostomus ternetzi

Species of catfish

Hypostomus ternetzi is a species of catfish in the family Loricariidae. It is native to South America, where it occurs in the basins of the Paraná River, the Paraguay River, and the Uruguay River. The species reaches 34.3 cm (13.5 inches) in total length and is believed to be a facultative air-breather. It is known to spawn by excavating nests in stream banks in which eggs are deposited.

== Etymology ==
The fish is named in honor of Swiss-born ichthyologist and naturalist Carl Ternetz (1870–1928), who was the one who collected the holotype.
