= Hypostomus paranensis =

Scientific classification
- Domain: Eukaryota
- Kingdom: Animalia
- Phylum: Chordata
- Class: Actinopterygii
- Order: Siluriformes
- Family: Loricariidae
- Genus: Hypostomus
- Species: H. paranensis

Binomial name
- Hypostomus paranensis Weyenbergh, 1877

Species of catfish

Hypostomus paranensis is a dubious species of catfish in the family Loricariidae. It is reportedly native to South America, where it occurs in the Paraná River basin in Argentina and Paraguay. The species is believed to be a facultative air-breather. It is currently listed as a species inquirenda by FishBase.
