= Hypostomus melanephelis =

Scientific classification
- Kingdom: Animalia
- Phylum: Chordata
- Class: Actinopterygii
- Order: Siluriformes
- Family: Loricariidae
- Genus: Hypostomus
- Species: H. melanephelis

Binomial name
- Hypostomus melanephelis Zawadzki, Oliveira, Oliveira & Py-Daniel, 2015

Species of catfish

Hypostomus melanephelis is a species of catfish in the family Loricariidae. It is native to South America, where it is known from the Tapajós basin near Itaituba in the state of Pará in Brazil. It is known to occur in running water with a substrate primarily composed of rock. The species reaches 17.8 cm (7 inches) in standard length and is believed to be a facultative air-breather.
