= Hypostomus coppenamensis =

Conservation status
- Near Threatened (IUCN 3.1)

Scientific classification
- Kingdom: Animalia
- Phylum: Chordata
- Class: Actinopterygii
- Division: Teleostei
- Order: Siluriformes
- Family: Loricariidae
- Genus: Hypostomus
- Species: H. coppenamensis

Binomial name
- Hypostomus coppenamensis Boeseman, 1969

Species of catfish

Hypostomus coppenamensis is a species of freshwater ray-finned fish belonging to the family Loricariidae, the suckermouth armored catfishes, and the subfamily Hypostominae, the suckermouth catfishes. This catfish occurs in the upper Coppename River basin in Suriname, for which it is named. The species reaches a standard length of 12.5 cm (4.9 in) and is believed to be a facultative air-breather.

Hypostomus coppenamensis sometimes appears in the aquarium trade, where it is typically known as the blackspotted Suriname pleco.
