= Hypostomus hemicochliodon =

Conservation status
- Least Concern (IUCN 3.1)

Scientific classification
- Kingdom: Animalia
- Phylum: Chordata
- Class: Actinopterygii
- Order: Siluriformes
- Family: Loricariidae
- Genus: Hypostomus
- Species: H. hemicochliodon

Binomial name
- Hypostomus hemicochliodon Armbruster, 2003

Species of catfish

Hypostomus hemicochliodon is a species of catfish in the family Loricariidae. It is native to South America, where it occurs in the Amazon River basin in Brazil, Ecuador, and Peru, as well as the Rio Negro and Orinoco drainage basins in Venezuela. The species reaches 14.3 inches (36.3 cm) in total length, can weigh up to at least 510 g (18 oz), and is believed to be a facultative air-breather.

Hypostomus hemicochliodon was described in 2003 by Jonathan W. Armbruster of Auburn University. Its specific epithet, hemicochliodon, refers to the fact that its teeth are about half as spoon-shaped as those of species such as Hypostomus cochliodon, which are xylophagous and specialize in eating wood.
