= Hypostomus johnii =

Scientific classification
- Kingdom: Animalia
- Phylum: Chordata
- Class: Actinopterygii
- Division: Teleostei
- Order: Siluriformes
- Family: Loricariidae
- Genus: Hypostomus
- Species: H. johnii

Binomial name
- Hypostomus johnii ( Steindachner, 1877)

Synonyms
- Plecostomus johnii Steindachner, 1877

Species of fish

Hypostomus johnii is a species of catfish in the family Loricariidae. It is native to South America, where it occurs in the basins of the Parnaíba River and the São Francisco River. The species reaches 11.3 cm (4.4 inches) SL and is believed to be a facultative air-breather.

== Etymology ==
The fish is named in honor of American geologist Orestes St. John (1841–1921), who collected the holotype during the 1865–1866 Thayer Expedition to Brazil.
