= Hypostomus corantijni =

Scientific classification
- Kingdom: Animalia
- Phylum: Chordata
- Class: Actinopterygii
- Division: Teleostei
- Order: Siluriformes
- Family: Loricariidae
- Genus: Hypostomus
- Species: H. corantijni

Binomial name
- Hypostomus corantijni Boeseman, 1968

Species of fish

Hypostomus corantijni is a species of catfish in the family Loricariidae. It is native to South America, where it occurs in the Courantyne River basin. The species reaches 18.8 cm (7.4 inches) SL.
