= Hypostomus levis =

Scientific classification
- Kingdom: Animalia
- Phylum: Chordata
- Class: Actinopterygii
- Order: Siluriformes
- Family: Loricariidae
- Genus: Hypostomus
- Species: H. levis

Binomial name
- Hypostomus levis (Pearson, 1924)

Synonyms
- Rhinelepis levis; Cochliodon levis

Species of fish

Hypostomus levis is a species of catfish in the family Loricariidae. It is native to South America, where it occurs in the Madeira River basin. The species reaches 18.8 cm (7.4 inches) SL and is believed to be a facultative air-breather. It reportedly inhabits high-altitude environments.
