= Hypostomus obtusirostris =

Conservation status
- Data Deficient (IUCN 3.1)

Scientific classification
- Kingdom: Animalia
- Phylum: Chordata
- Class: Actinopterygii
- Order: Siluriformes
- Family: Loricariidae
- Genus: Hypostomus
- Species: H. obtusirostris

Binomial name
- Hypostomus obtusirostris (Steindachner, 1907)

Synonyms
- Plecostomus obtusirostris

Species of catfish

Hypostomus obtusirostris is a species of catfish in the family Loricariidae. It is native to South America, where it occurs in the coastal drainage basins of southeastern Brazil. The species reaches at least 5.9 centimetres (2.3 in) in total length and is believed to be a facultative air-breather.
