= Hypostomus sculpodon =

Scientific classification
- Kingdom: Animalia
- Phylum: Chordata
- Class: Actinopterygii
- Order: Siluriformes
- Family: Loricariidae
- Genus: Hypostomus
- Species: H. sculpodon

Binomial name
- Hypostomus sculpodon Armbruster, 2003

Species of catfish

Hypostomus sculpodon is a species of catfish in the family Loricariidae. It is native to South America, where it occurs in the basins of the Rio Negro and the Orinoco in Venezuela. The species reaches 26.4 cm (10.4 inches) SL and is believed to be a facultative air-breather.
