= Hypostomus pagei =

Scientific classification
- Kingdom: Animalia
- Phylum: Chordata
- Class: Actinopterygii
- Division: Teleostei
- Order: Siluriformes
- Family: Loricariidae
- Genus: Hypostomus
- Species: H. pagei

Binomial name
- Hypostomus pagei Armbruster, 2003

Species of catfish

Hypostomus pagei is a species of catfish in the family Loricariidae. It is native to South America, where it occurs in the basins of the Aroa River, the Tocuyo River, and the Yaracuy River in Venezuela, although it has also been reported from Suriname. The species reaches 18.9 cm (7.4 inches) SL and is believed to be a facultative air-breather. Its specific epithet, pagei, is stated to refer to Dr. Lawrence M. Page, who collected a majority of the specimens of the species.

== Etymology ==
The fish is named in honor of American ichthyologist Lawrence M. Page (b. 1944).
