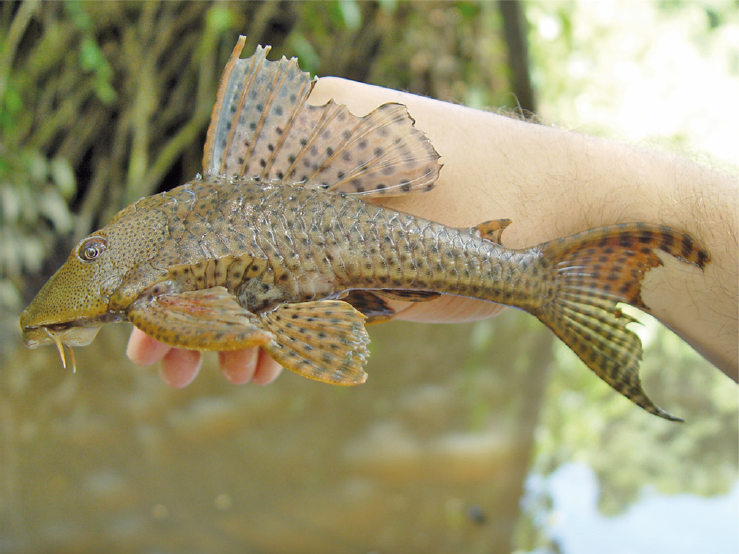
- Hypostomus plecostomus

Scientific classification
- Kingdom: Animalia
- Phylum: Chordata
- Class: Actinopterygii
- Division: Teleostei
- Order: Siluriformes
- Family: Loricariidae
- Subfamily: Hypostominae; Kner, 1853
- Genus: Hypostomus; Lacépède, 1803

Type species
- Hypostomus guacari Lacépède, 1803

Synonyms
- Cheiridodus C. H. Eigenmann, 1922; Cochliodon Heckel, 1854; Watawata Isbrücker & Michels, 2001

= Hypostomus =

Genus of fishes

Hypostomus is a genus of freshwater ray-finned fishes belonging to the family Loricariidae, the suckermouth armored catfishes, and the subfamily Hypostominae, the suckermouth catfishes. They are native to tropical and subtropical South America. H. plecostomus is the popular freshwater aquarium fish formerly known as Plecostomus plecostomus. The taxonomic structure of the Loricariidae is still being expanded by scientists. Hypostomus is a highly species-rich and widely distributed catfish genus.

== Taxonomy and phylogeny ==
Hypostomus was first formally proposed as a monospecific genus in 1803 by the French naturalist Bernard Germain de Lacépède, when he put forward the name Hypostomus guacari as an unnecessary replacement for Acipenser plecostomus Linnaeus, 1758. Acipenser plecostomus had been described in 1758 by Linnaeus, with its type locality given as the Suriname River. This genus is sometimes classfied in the tribe Hypostomini, but Eschmeyer's Catalog of Fishes does not recognise tribes within the subfamily Hypostominae.

With the inclusion of Aphanotorulus and Isorineloricaria, the genus Hypostomus is by far the largest genus of Loricariidae and the second largest genus of catfish. However, a good way to split up the genus further is unclear. Species level taxonomy of Hypostomus is still poorly known as well as the phylogenetic relationships within and of the genus. It has been shown that the genus does not form a natural group. However, small monophyletic groups are known to exist within the genus Hypostomus, such as the H. cochliodon group. Aphanotorulus and Isorineloricaria are considered separate genera by some authors, based on molecular information.

Studies conducted with representatives of some genera of Hypostominae showed that within this group, the diploid number ranges from 2n = 52 to 2n = 80. However, the supposed wide karyotypic diversity that the family Loricariidae or the subfamily Hypostominae would present is almost exclusively restricted to the genus Hypostomus, and the species from the other genera had a conserved diploid number.

== Distribution and habitat ==
These species originate from freshwater habitats of South America and the Caribbean island of Trinidad. They are found throughout most of the range of loricariids, except for drainages west of the Atrato River (northwest Colombia). They are essentially ubiquitous throughout their range. Maximum diversity in number of species of Hypostomus occurs in rivers of the Paraná-Paraguay system.

Hypostomus species are found in almost all aquatic habitats, from large rivers to small rivulets. The typical habitat would be relatively fast moving water over a shallow gravel bed. Most species are lowland, sluggish stream- and lake-dwellers usually found associated with submerged wood; however, many species may be found among rocks in piedmont to mountain streams with moderate to swift flow. Members of this genus may be found over a range of substrates such mud, detritus, gravel, and sand. Many species spawn in hollows dug into mud banks or within hollow logs.

== Description and ecology ==
As in all loricariids, these species have a suckermouth. They use their mouth as well as the pectoral, pelvic and caudal fin areas, to interact with the rocky river-bottom. The comb-toothed inferior mouth of Hypostomus is able to grasp green algae on the river bottom. With the help of the suckermouth, which anchor the fishes, in conjunction with the arched design of pectoral and pelvic fin spines, they are also able to remain upright while exploring this substratum. In addition, their large, concave caudal fin is associated with fast locomotion over short distances.

Also like other loricariids, Hypostomus species exhibit plates of armor over their body. The colouration among Hypostomus species varies. They may have a white ground color and black spots, or brown and spotted, or even black with red, gold, or white spots. Abdomen also varies in color from white to black and may be spotted or not. The caudal fin is forked with the lower lobe longer than upper. Most species have stout bodies, but some do have thinner, elongate bodies.

In most species, males develop hypertrophied odontodes on the leading edge of the pectoral fin spine and the end of the spine may become swollen. In some species, the males may also develop hypertrophied odontodes on the body during the breeding season.

Hypostomus species are well known for the ability to breathe air. This is achieved through a slightly modified stomach that is larger and thinner than in non-air breathers. To breathe air, Hypostomus must orient itself vertically.

Species of the H. cochliodon group are fairly large loricariids that reach about 30 centimetres (12 in) SL. Their colouration is typically dark brown with spots generally developed over most surfaces; however, most species of this group have been observed to have a well-developed ability to alter color according to substrate. Except for H. sculpodon, these species tend to have a deep body at the dorsal fin origin; this makes the body appear humped. Along with Panaque, species of the H. cochliodon group are unique among loricariids for xylophagy, or the ability to digest wood, accomplished through specialized spoon-shaped teeth. In H. hemicochliodon and H. sculpodon appear to be intermediate between other species of Hypostomus and the H. cochilodon group by feeding less on wood and lacking specialized teeth; many other Hypostomus will occasionally eat wood, but wood only amounts to a very small fraction of their diet.

== Species ==
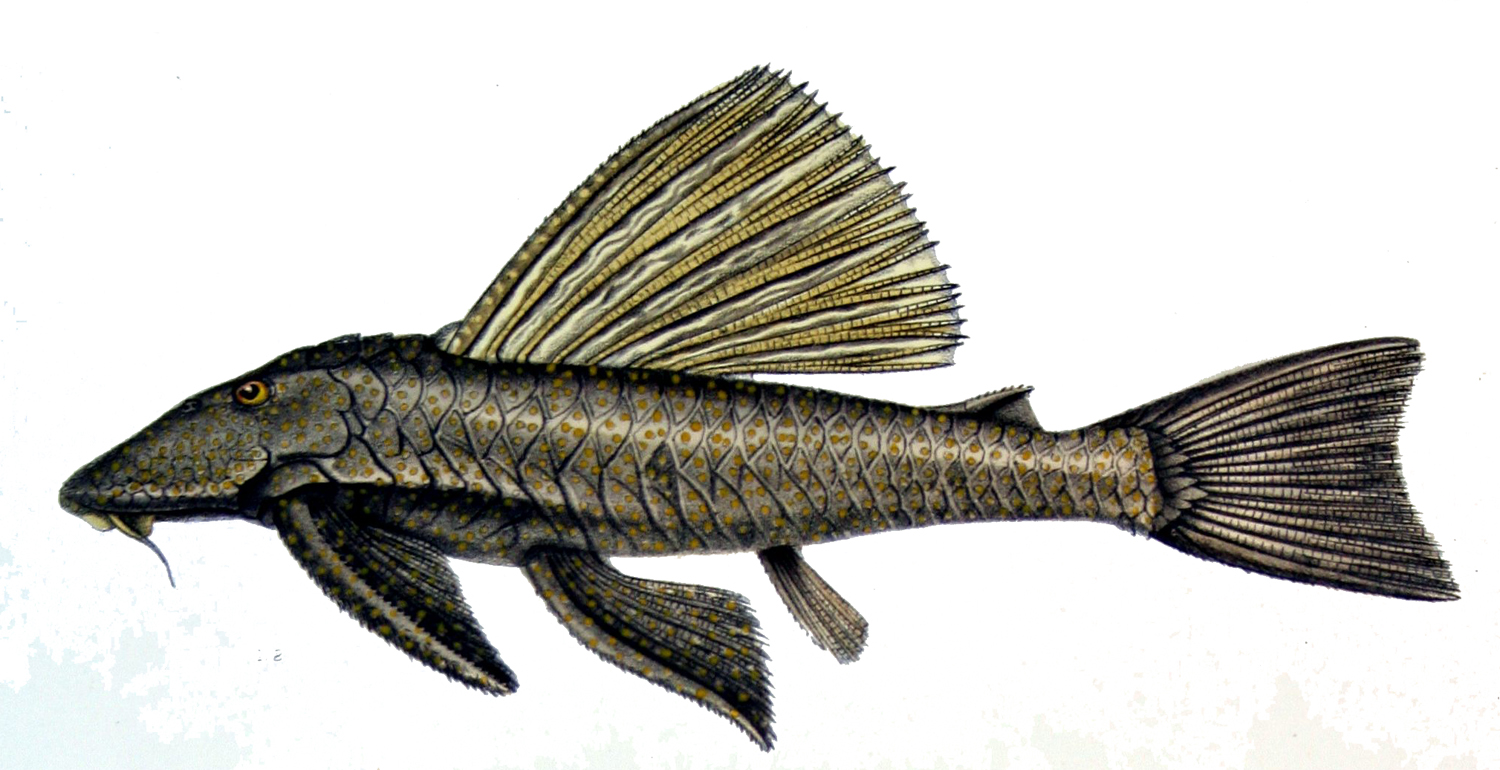
Hypostomus alatus

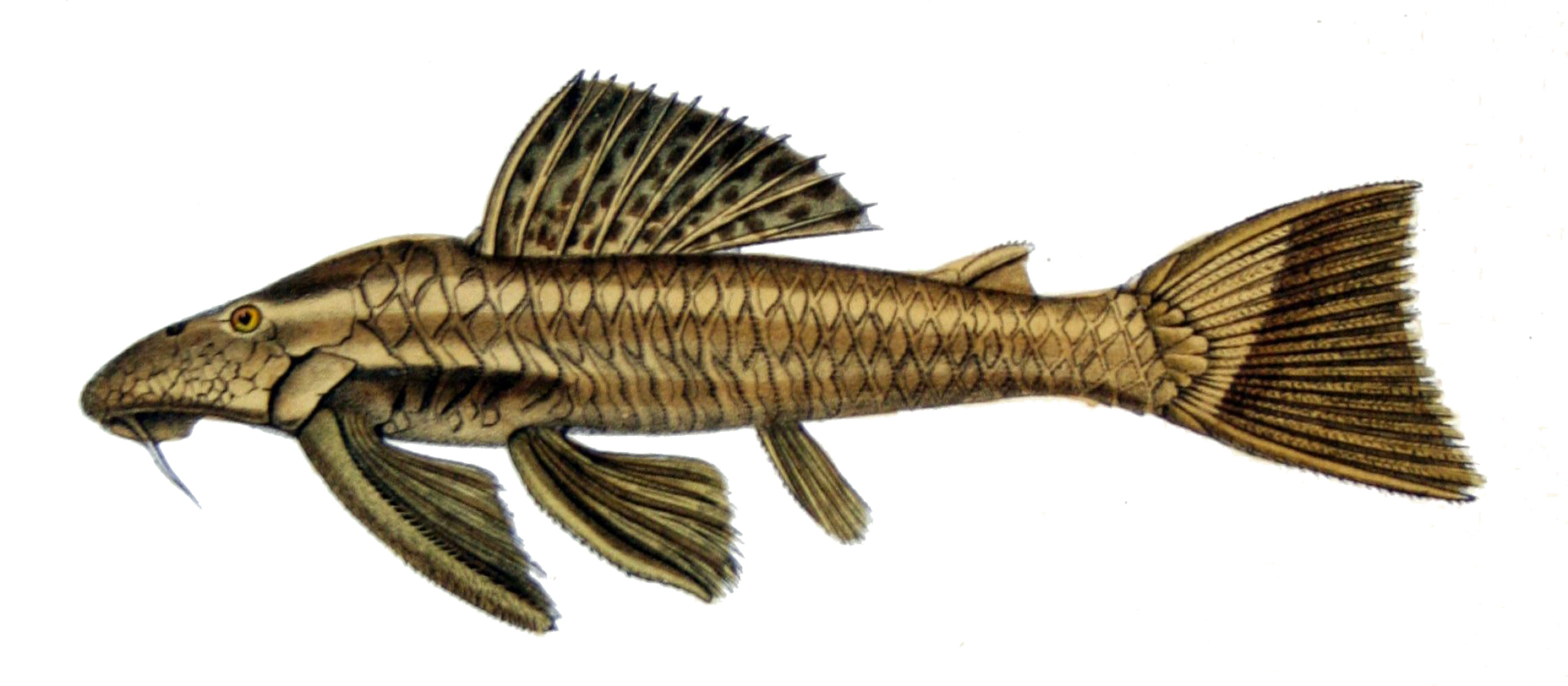
Hypostomus asperatus

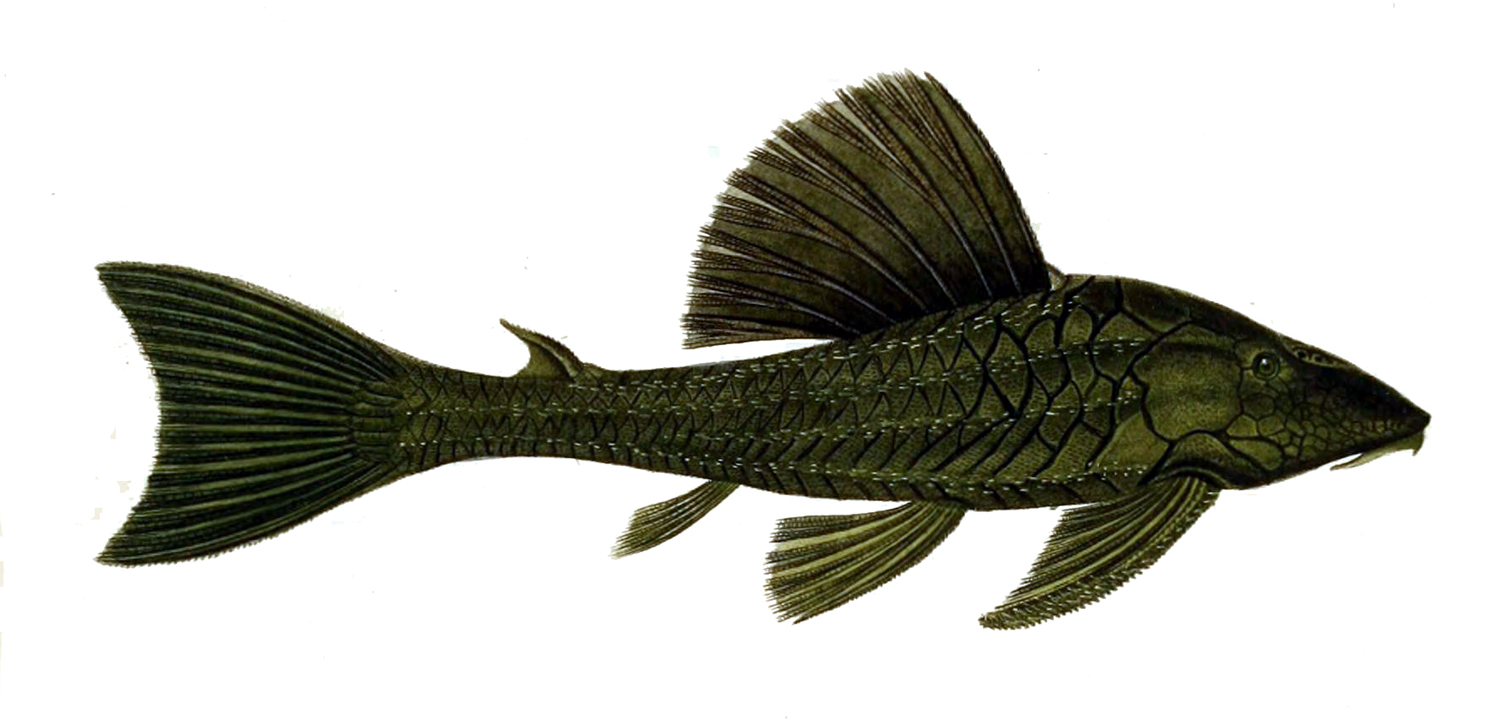
Hypostomus commersoni

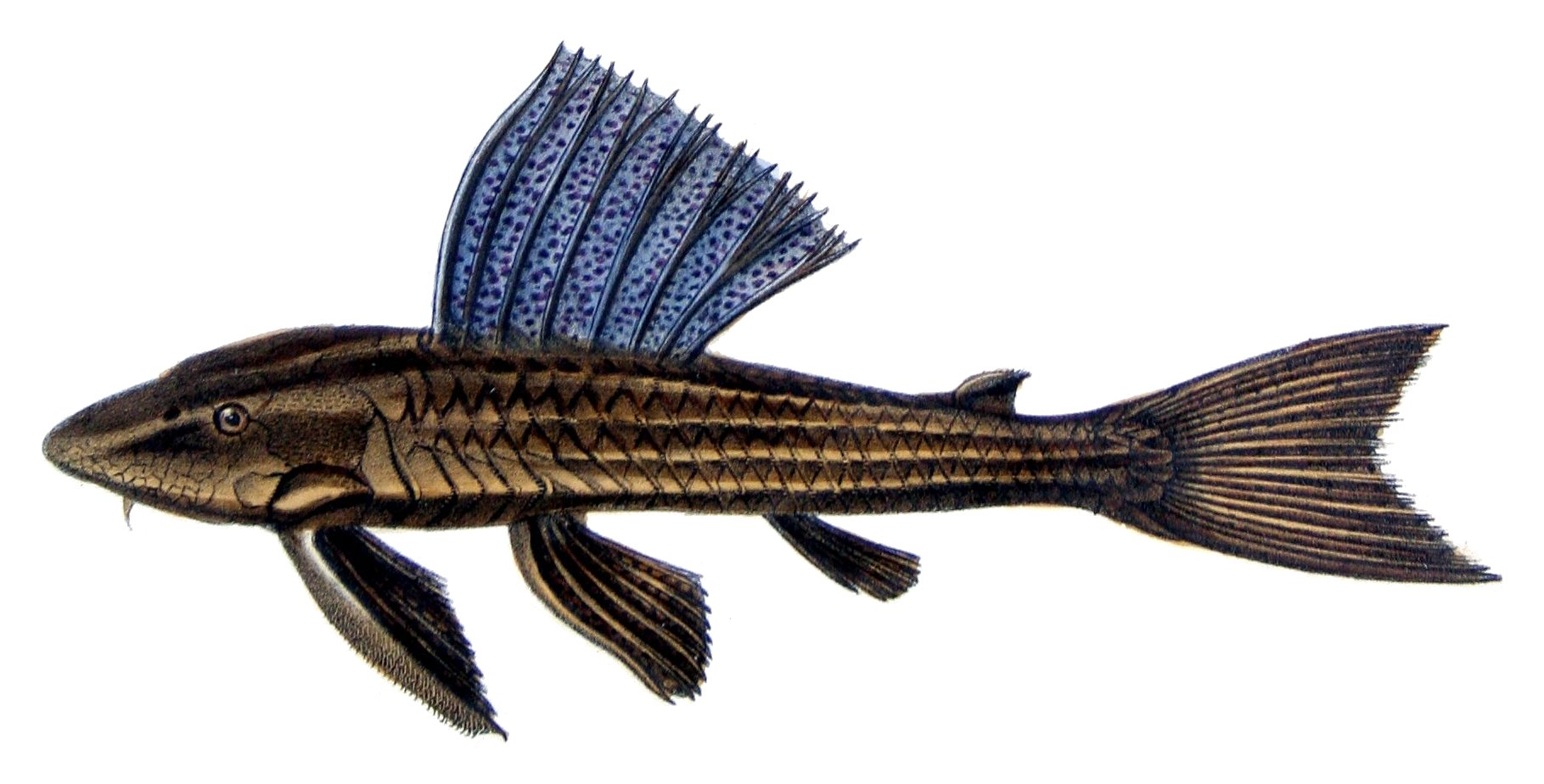
Hypostomus subcarinatus

Hypostomus contains the following valid recognized species:

- Hypostomus affinis (Steindachner, 1877)
- Hypostomus agna (A. Miranda-Ribeiro, 1907)
- Hypostomus alatus Castelnau, 1855
- Hypostomus albopunctatus (Regan, 1908)
- Hypostomus ancistroides (R. von Ihering (pt), 1911)
- Hypostomus angipinnatus (Leege, 1922)
- Hypostomus annectens (Regan, 1904)
- Hypostomus arecuta Y. P. Cardoso, Almirón, Casciotta, Aichino, Lizarralde & Montoya-Burgos, 2012
- Hypostomus argus (Fowler, 1943)
- Hypostomus asperatus Castelnau, 1855
- Hypostomus aspidolepis (Günther, 1867)
- Hypostomus aspilogaster (Cope, 1894)
- Hypostomus atropinnis (C. H. Eigenmann & R. S. Eigenmann, 1890)
- Hypostomus auroguttatus Kner, 1854
- Hypostomus basilisko Tencatt, Zawadzki & Froehlich, 2014
- Hypostomus bimbai Zawadzki & Penido, 2021
- Hypostomus bolivianus (N. E. Pearson, 1924)
- Hypostomus borellii (Boulenger, 1897)
- Hypostomus boulengeri (C. H. Eigenmann & C. H. Kennedy, 1903)
- Hypostomus brevicauda (Günther, 1864)
- Hypostomus brevis (Nichols, 1919)
- Hypostomus cafuringa Soares, Aquino, Bagley, Langeani & Colli, 2021
- Hypostomus careopinnatus Martins, Marinho, Langeani & J. P. Serra, 2012
- Hypostomus cari Lustosa-Costa, Ramos, Zawadzki, Jacobina & S. M. Q. Lima, 2024
- Hypostomus carinatus (Steindachner, 1881)
- Hypostomus caudofasciatus Zawadzki & Azevedo, 2024
- Hypostomus cochliodon Kner, 1854
- Hypostomus commersoni Valenciennes, 1836
- Hypostomus coppenamensis Boeseman, 1969
- Hypostomus corantijni Boeseman, 1968
- Hypostomus crassicauda Boeseman, 1968
- Hypostomus crulsi Soares, Aquino, Bagley, Langeani & Colli, 2021
- Hypostomus dardanelos Zawadzki & P. H. Carvalho, 2014
- Hypostomus delimai Zawadzki, R. R. de Oliveira & Debona, 2013
- Hypostomus denticulatus Zawadzki, C. Weber & Pavanelli, 2008
- Hypostomus derbyi (Haseman, 1911)
- Hypostomus dlouhyi C. Weber, 1985
- Hypostomus ericae P. H. Carvalho & C. Weber, 2005
- Hypostomus ericius Armbruster, 2003
- Hypostomus faveolus Zawadzki, Birindelli & F. C. T. Lima, 2008
- Hypostomus fluviatilis (Schubart, 1964)
- Hypostomus fonchii C. Weber & Montoya-Burgos, 2002
- Hypostomus formosae Y. P. Cardoso, Brancolini, Paracampo, Lizarralde, Covain & Montoya-Burgos, 2016
- Hypostomus francisci (Lütken, 1874)
- Hypostomus freirei Penido, Pessali & Zawadzki, 2021
- Hypostomus froehlichi Zawadzki, Nardi & Tencatt, 2021
- Hypostomus fuscomaculatus Zawadzki & Pains da Silva, 2022
- Hypostomus garmani (Regan, 1904)
- Hypostomus goyazensis (Regan, 1908)
- Hypostomus guajupia Penido, Pessali & Zawadzki, 2021
- Hypostomus gymnorhynchus (Norman, 1926)
- Hypostomus hemicochliodon Armbruster, 2003
- Hypostomus hemiurus (C. H. Eigenmann, 1912)
- Hypostomus heraldoi Zawadzki, C. Weber & Pavanelli, 2008
- Hypostomus hermanni (R. Ihering, 1905)
- Hypostomus holostictus (Regan, 1913)
- Hypostomus hondae (Regan, 1912)
- Hypostomus hoplonites Rapp Py-Daniel, 1988
- Hypostomus iheringii (Regan, 1908)
- Hypostomus interruptus (|A. Miranda-Ribeiro, 1918)
- Hypostomus isbrueckeri R. E. dos Reis, C. Weber & L. R. Malabarba, 1990
- Hypostomus itacua Valenciennes, 1836
- Hypostomus jaguar Zanata, Sardeiro & Zawadzki, 2013
- Hypostomus johnii (Steindachner, 1877)
- Hypostomus khimaera Tencatt, Zawadzki & Froehlich, 2014
- Hypostomus kopeyaka P. H. Carvalho, F. C. T. Lima & Zawadzki, 2010
- Hypostomus krikati R. F. Oliveira, Guimarães, Brito & Ottoni, 2022
- Hypostomus krishnamurtii Zawadzki, Penido & Lucinda, 2020
- Hypostomus kuarup Zawadzki, Birindelli & F. C. T. Lima, 2012
- Hypostomus labyrinthus R. R. de Oliveira, Ribeiro, Canto & Zawadzki, 2020
- Hypostomus lamberti Penido, Pessali & Zawadzki, 2023
- Hypostomus laplatae (C. H. Eigenmann, 1907)
- Hypostomus latifrons C. Weber, 1986
- Hypostomus latirostris (Regan, 1904)
- Hypostomus leucophaeus Zanata & Pitanga, 2016
- Hypostomus levis (N. E. Pearson, 1924)
- Hypostomus lima (Lütken, 1874)
- Hypostomus longiradiatus (Holly, 1929)
- Hypostomus luetkeni (Steindachner, 1877)
- Hypostomus luteomaculatus (Devincenzi, 1942)
- Hypostomus luteus (Godoy (pt), 1980)
- Hypostomus macrophthalmus Boeseman, 1968
- Hypostomus macrops (C. H. Eigenmann & R. S. Eigenmann, 1888)
- Hypostomus macushi Armbruster & L. S. Souza, 2005
- Hypostomus maracaiboensis (L. P. Schultz, 1944)
- Hypostomus margaritifer (Regan, 1908)
- Hypostomus melanephelis Zawadzki, A. S. Oliveira, R. R. de Oliveira & Rapp Py-Daniel, 2015
- Hypostomus meleagris (Marini, Nichols & La Monte, 1933)
- Hypostomus micromaculatus Boeseman, 1968
- Hypostomus microstomus C. Weber, 1987
- Hypostomus minotauros Zawadzki, Penido, Pessali & Lucinda, 2024
- Hypostomus multidens Jerep, Shibatta & Zawadzki, 2007
- Hypostomus mutucae Knaack, 1999
- Hypostomus myersi (Gosline, 1947)
- Hypostomus nematopterus Isbrücker & Nijssen, 1984
- Hypostomus niceforoi (Fowler, 1943)
- Hypostomus nigrolineatus Zawadzki, Carvalho, Birindelli & Azevedo, 2016
- Hypostomus nigromaculatus (Schubart, 1964)
- Hypostomus nigropunctatus Garavello, Britski & Zawadzki, 2012
- Hypostomus nudiventris (Fowler, 1941)
- Hypostomus obtusirostris (Steindachner, 1907)
- Hypostomus oculeus (Fowler, 1943)
- Hypostomus pagei Armbruster, 2003
- Hypostomus pantherinus Kner, 1854
- Hypostomus paranensis Weyenbergh (de), 1877
- Hypostomus pastinhai Zawadzki & Penido, 2021
- Hypostomus paucimaculatus Boeseman, 1968
- Hypostomus paucipunctatus P. H. Carvalho & C. Weber, 2005
- Hypostomus paulinus (R. Ihering, 1905)
- Hypostomus peckoltoides Zawadzki, C. Weber & Pavanelli, 2010
- Hypostomus perdido Zawadzki, Tencatt & Froehlich, 2014
- Hypostomus piratatu C. Weber, 1986
- Hypostomus plecostomoides (C. H. Eigenmann, 1922)
- Hypostomus plecostomus (Linnaeus, 1758) (sucker-mouth catfish)
- Hypostomus pseudohemiurus Boeseman, 1968
- Hypostomus punctatus Valenciennes, 1840
- Hypostomus pusarum (Starks, 1913)
- Hypostomus pyrineusi (|A. Miranda-Ribeiro, 1920)
- Hypostomus regani (Ihering, 1905)
- Hypostomus renestoi Zawadzki, Pains da Silva & Troy, 2018
- Hypostomus rhantos Armbruster, Tansey & Lujan, 2007
- Hypostomus robertsoni Dias & Zawadzki, 2021
- Hypostomus robinii Valenciennes, 1840
- Hypostomus rondoni (A. Miranda-Ribeiro, 1912)
- Hypostomus roseopunctatus R. E. dos Reis, C. Weber & L. R. Malabarba, 1990
- Hypostomus saramaccensis Boeseman, 1968
- Hypostomus scabriceps (C. H. Eigenmann & R. S. Eigenmann, 1888)
- Hypostomus sculpodon Armbruster, 2003
- Hypostomus seminudus (C. H. Eigenmann & R. S. Eigenmann, 1888)
- Hypostomus sertanejo Zawadzki, Ramos & Sabaj, 2017
- Hypostomus simios P. H. Carvalho & C. Weber, 2005
- Hypostomus soniae P. H. Carvalho & C. Weber, 2005
- Hypostomus spiniger (Hensel, 1870)
- Hypostomus strigaticeps (Regan, 1908)
- Hypostomus subcarinatus Castelnau, 1855
- Hypostomus surinamensis Boeseman, 1968
- Hypostomus taphorni (Lilyestrom, 1984)
- Hypostomus tapijara Oyakawa, Akama & Zanata, 2005
- Hypostomus tenuis Boeseman, 1968
- Hypostomus ternetzi (Boulenger, 1895)
- Hypostomus tietensis (R. Ihering, 1905)
- Hypostomus topavae (Godoy (pt), 1969)
- Hypostomus unae (Steindachner, 1878)
- Hypostomus uruguayensis R. E. dos Reis, C. Weber & L. R. Malabarba, 1990
- Hypostomus vaillanti (Steindachner, 1877)
- Hypostomus variipictus (R. von Ihering, 1911)
- Hypostomus varimaculosus (Fowler, 1945)
- Hypostomus variostictus (|A. Miranda-Ribeiro, 1912)
- Hypostomus velhochico Zawadzki, Oyakawa & Britski, 2017
- Hypostomus velhomonge Lustosa-Costa, Ramos, Zawadzki & S. M. Q. Lima, 2022
- Hypostomus ventromaculatus Boeseman, 1968
- Hypostomus vermicularis (C. H. Eigenmann & R. S. Eigenmann, 1888)
- Hypostomus waiampi P. H. Carvalho & C. Weber, 2005
- Hypostomus watwata Hancock, 1828 (armored catfish)
- Hypostomus weberi P. H. Carvalho, F. C. T. Lima & Zawadzki, 2010
- Hypostomus wilsoni (C. H. Eigenmann, 1918)
- Hypostomus wuchereri (Günther, 1864)
- Hypostomus yaku Martins, Langeani & Zawadzki, 2014
