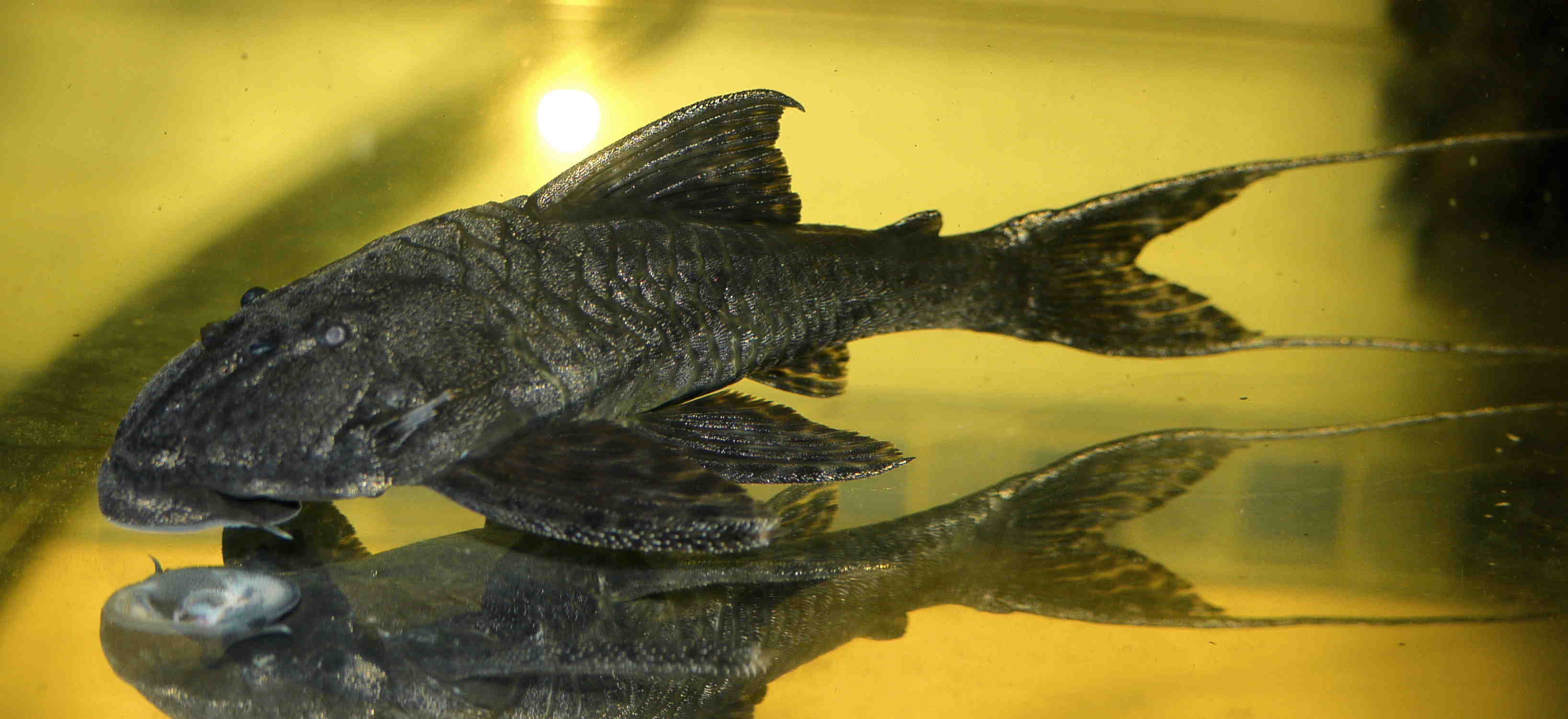
- The shallow-water form of the species.

Conservation status
- Least Concern (IUCN 3.1)

Scientific classification
- Kingdom: Animalia
- Phylum: Chordata
- Class: Actinopterygii
- Division: Teleostei
- Order: Siluriformes
- Family: Loricariidae
- Subfamily: Hypostominae
- Genus: Peckoltia
- Species: P. pankimpuju

Binomial name
- Peckoltia pankimpuju (Lujan & Chamon, 2008)

Synonyms
- Hemiancistrus pankimpuju Lujan & Chamon, 2008

= Peckoltia pankimpuju =

Species of fish

Peckoltia pankimpuju is a species of freshwater ray-finned fish belonging to the family Loricariidae, the suckermouth armoured catfishes, and the subfamily Hypostominae, the suckermouth catfishes. This catfish is known from the Marañón River in the upper Amazon basin of Peru. It is commonly called the coal pleco, Peruvian lyre-tail, and L350 under the L-number code. It reaches up to about 40 cm (16 in) in length.

This species, Panaque bathyphilus, Panaqolus nix, Loricaria spinulifera and L. pumila are the only loricariid catfish species known to occur in a deep water form with reduced pigment and eyes (similar to cavefish), and another "normal" form in shallower waters. P. pankimpuju and a few other loricariid catfish species of the main stream of large South American rivers have greatly elongated streamers on their tail. It is speculated that this may serve as an early warning system against the large predatory catfish that also roam their habitat. Positioned with the head towards the water current, as typical of loricariid catfish, the long tail streamers of P. pankimpuju are the first to be contacted by a large predator that hunts against the current, perhaps allowing it to escape.
