= Amazon basin =

Major drainage basin in South America

Coordinates: 3°S 60°W

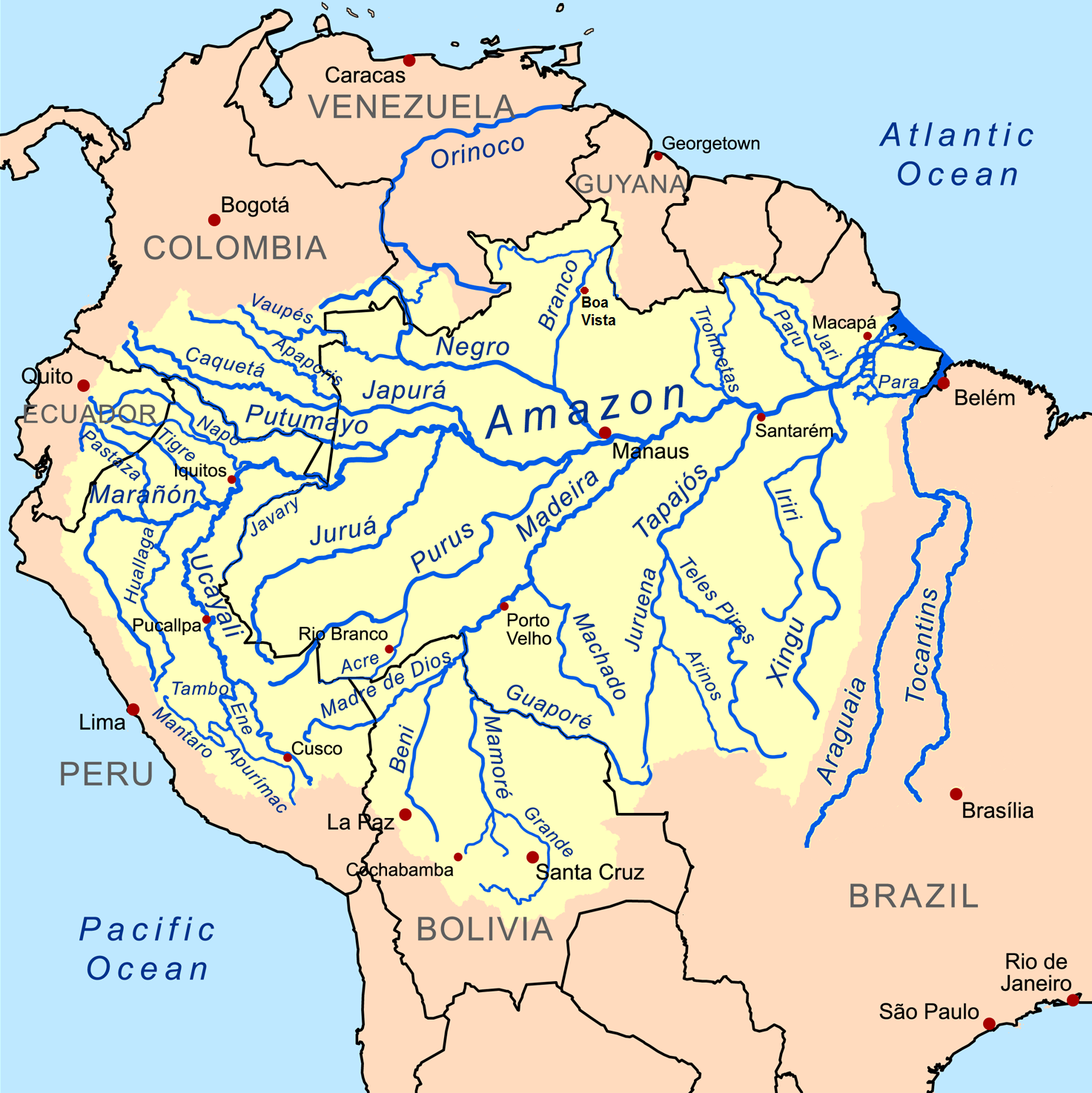
Amazon River basin.

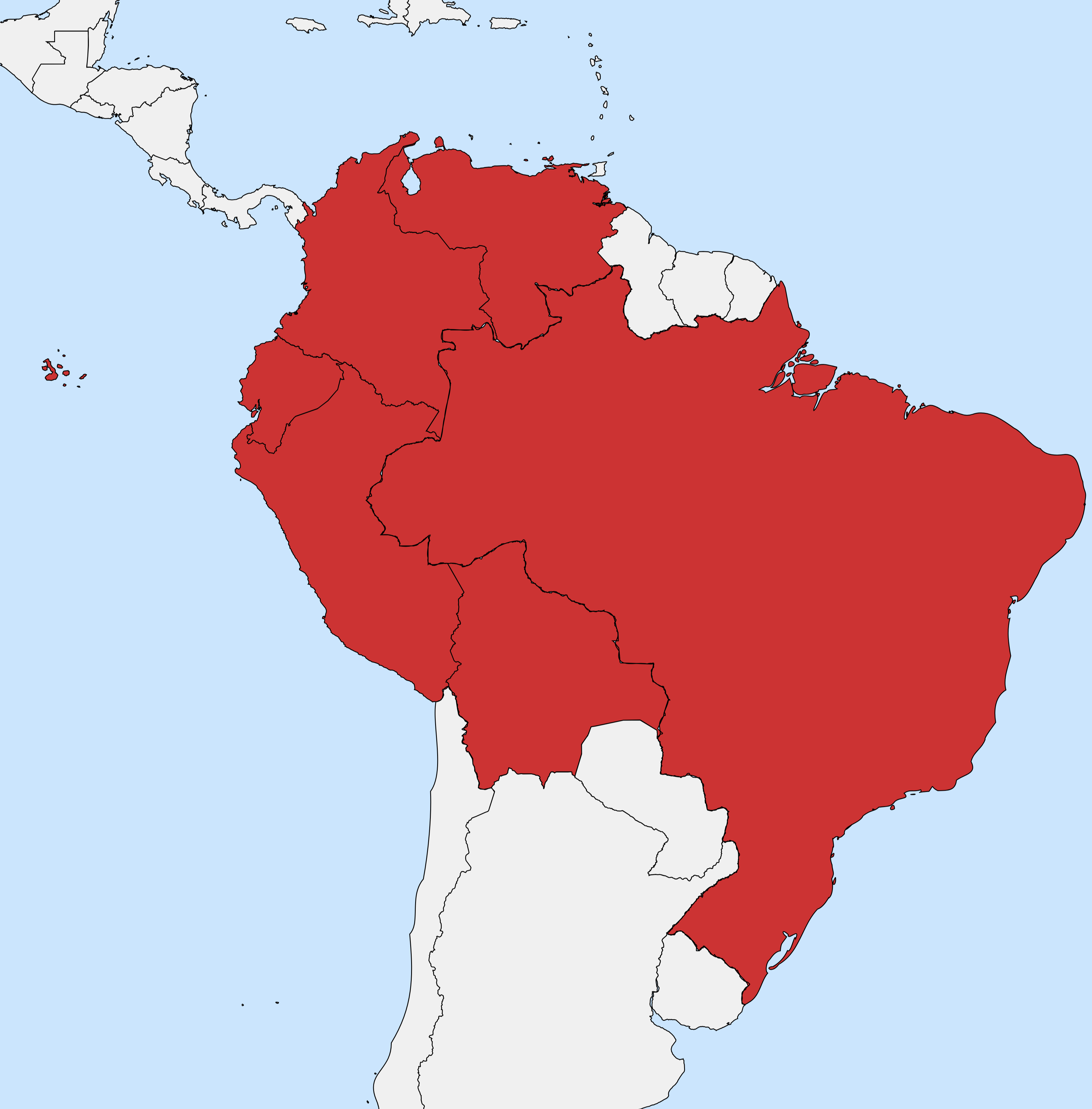
Countries where the Amazon basin is present

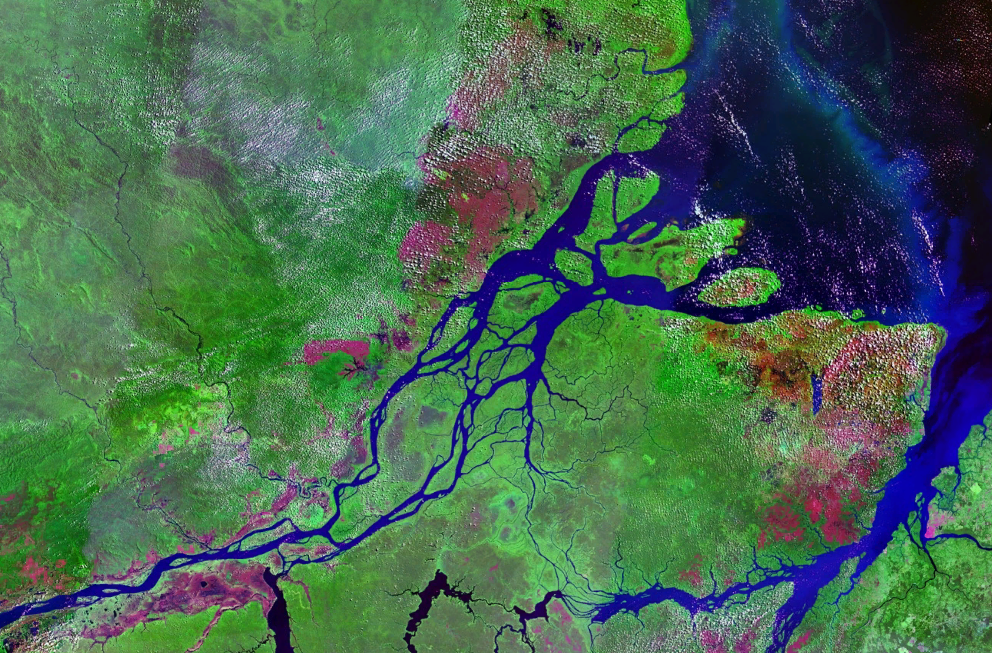
The mouth of the Amazon River

The Amazon basin is the part of South America drained by the Amazon River and its tributaries. The Amazon drainage basin covers a large area spreading across the countries of Bolivia, Brazil, Colombia, Ecuador, Guyana, Peru, Suriname, and Venezuela, as well as the territory of French Guiana.

Most of the basin is covered by the Amazon rainforest, also known as Amazonia. With a 6 million km^{2} (2.3 million mi^{2}) area of dense tropical forest, it is the largest rainforest in the world. The Amazon basin is the most biodiverse region in the world, being home to many of the Earth's plant, mammal, bird, reptile, amphibian, fish and insect species. While being very biodiverse the majority of the Amazon basin is sparsely populated by humans with the exceptions of cities such as Manaus and Belém. There are many indigenous communities who represent many different cultures and languages. For the people living in the Amazon basin fishing and agriculture are a very important livelihood.

== Geography ==
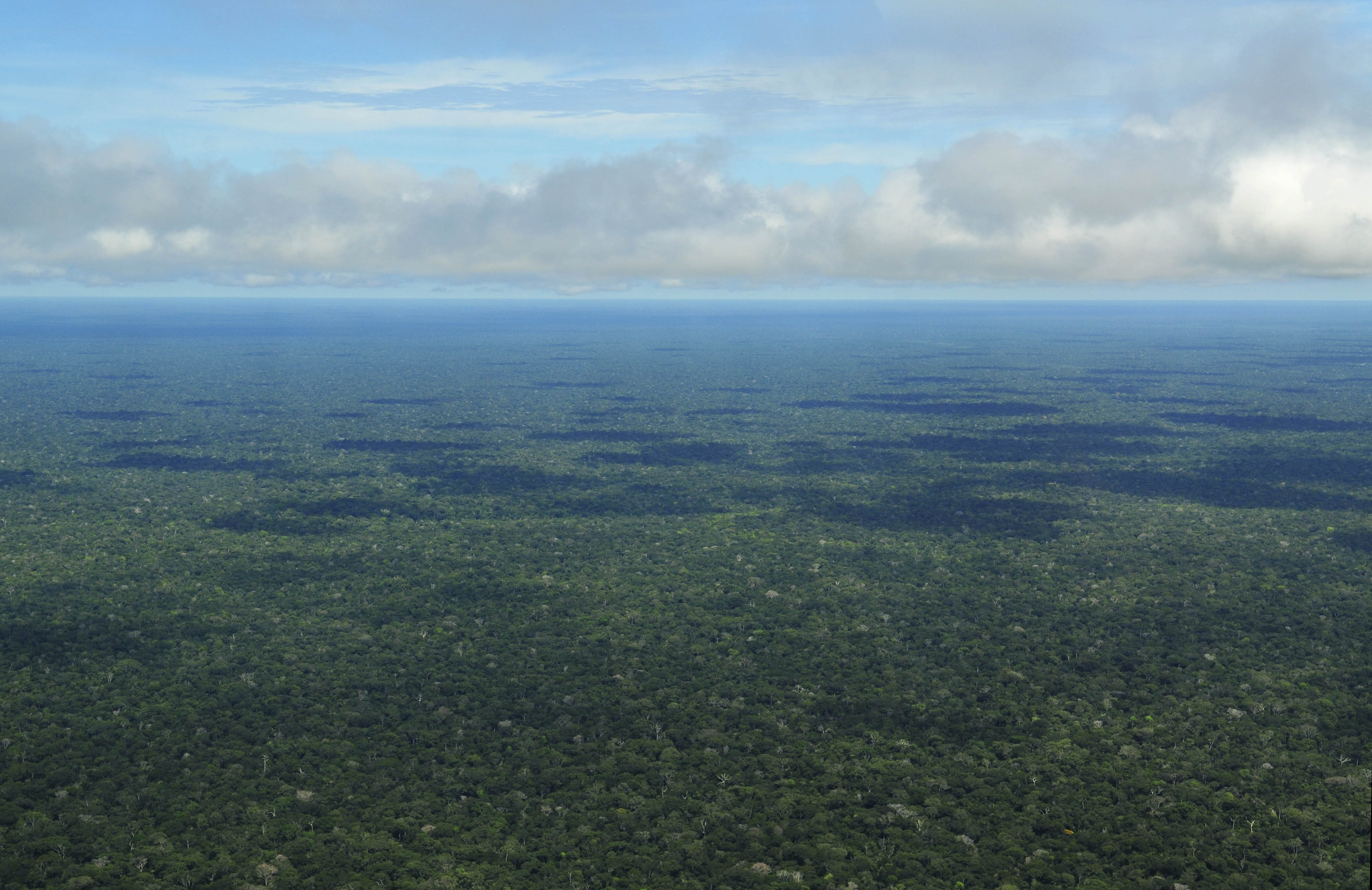
Aerial view of the Amazon rainforest, near Manaus

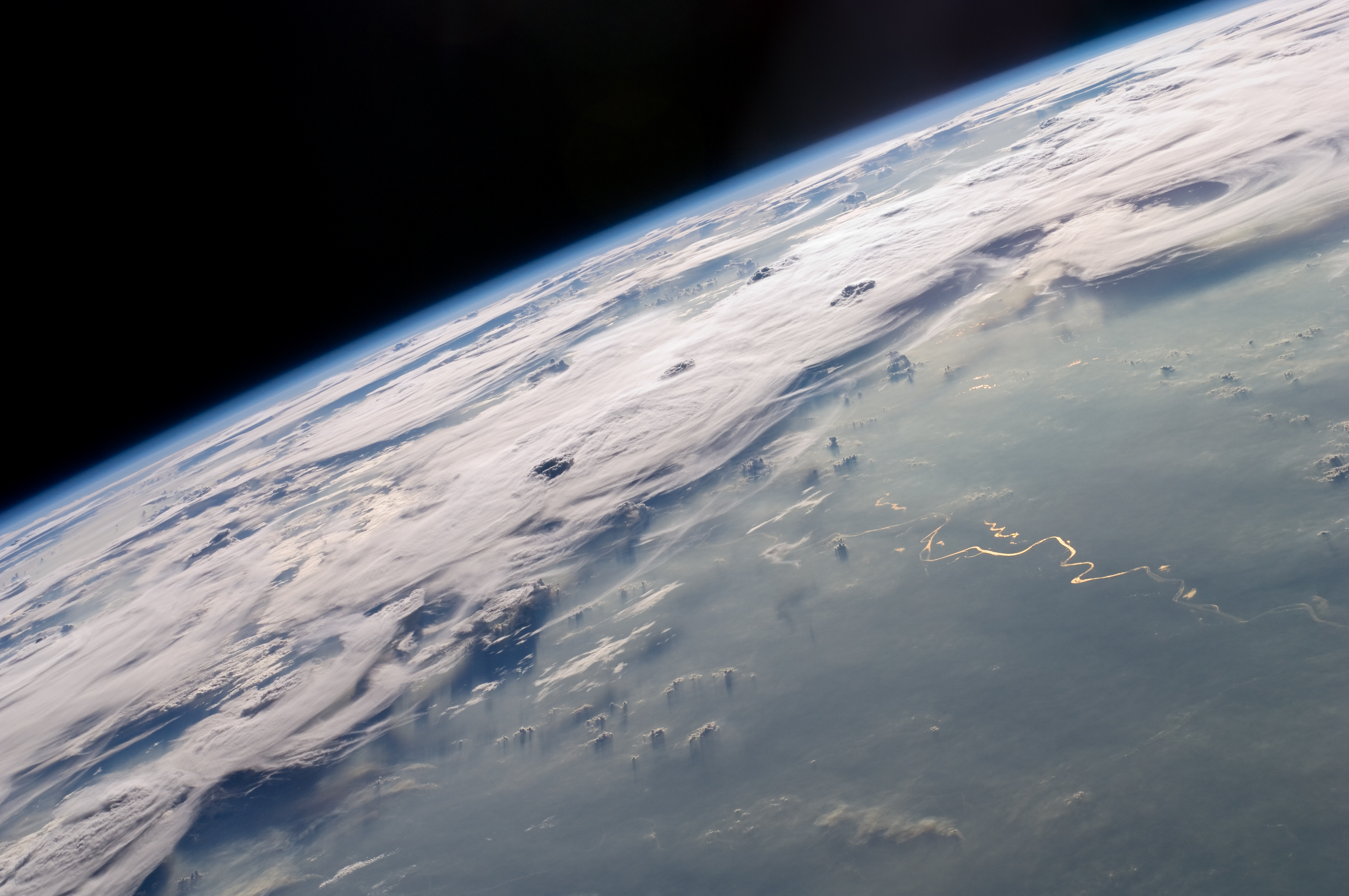
Amazon basin seen from the ISS

The Amazon drainage basin covers an area of about 7,000,000 km^{2} (2,700,000 sq mi), or about 35.5 percent of the South American continent. The Amazon River begins in the Andes Mountains at the west of the basin with its main tributary the Marañón River and Apurimac River in Peru. The highest point in the watershed of the Amazon is the second biggest peak of Yerupajá at 6,635 metres (21,768 ft).

The Amazon River basin occupies the entire central and eastern area of South America, lying to the east of the Andes mountain range and extending from the Guyana Plateau in the north to the Brazilian Plateau in the south.

With a length of about 6400 km before it drains into the Atlantic Ocean, it is one of the two longest rivers in the world. A team of scientists has claimed that the Amazon is longer than the Nile, but debate about its exact length continues.

The Amazon system transports the largest volume of water of any river system, accounting for about 20% of the total water carried to the oceans by rivers. Some of the Amazon rainforests are deforested because of an increase in cattle ranches and soybean fields. The Amazon basin formerly flowed west to the Pacific Ocean until the Andes formed, causing the basin to flow eastward towards the Atlantic Ocean.

Politically the basin is divided into Peruvian Amazonia, Amazônia Legal of Brazil, the Amazon natural region of Colombia, Amazonas (Venezuelan state), and parts of Bolivia and Ecuador.

Distribution of the Amazon River basin area and discharge between countries
Country	State	Area (km^{2})	(%)	Discharge (km^{3})	(%)
Bolivia		724,000	10.4	291	4.0
Brazil		4,674,619	67.5	4,167.3	57.2
	(Acre (state)) Acre	164,123	3.5	144.2	2.0
	Amapá	44,870	1.0	57.7	0.8
	(Amazonas (Brazilian state)) Amazonas	1,559,159	33.3	1,848.3	25.4
	Brasília	1,010	0.02		
	Goiás	212,131	4.5	96.7	1.3
	Maranhão	39,396	0.8	9.4	0.1
	Mato Grosso	723,470	15.5	490.6	6.7
	Pará	1,190,147	25.5	1,053.1	14.5
	Rondônia	237,591	5.08	140.6	1.9
	Roraima	224,301	4.8	211.6	2.9
	Tocantins	278,421	6.0	115.1	1.6
Ecuador		146,688	2.1	258.4	3.6
Guyana		12,224	0.2	8.8	0.1
Colombia		345,293	5.0	755	10.4
Peru		967,176	14.0	1,739.5	23.9
Venezuela		53,000	0.8	60.0	0.8
Amazon basin		6,923,000	100.0	7,280	100.0

== Plant life ==
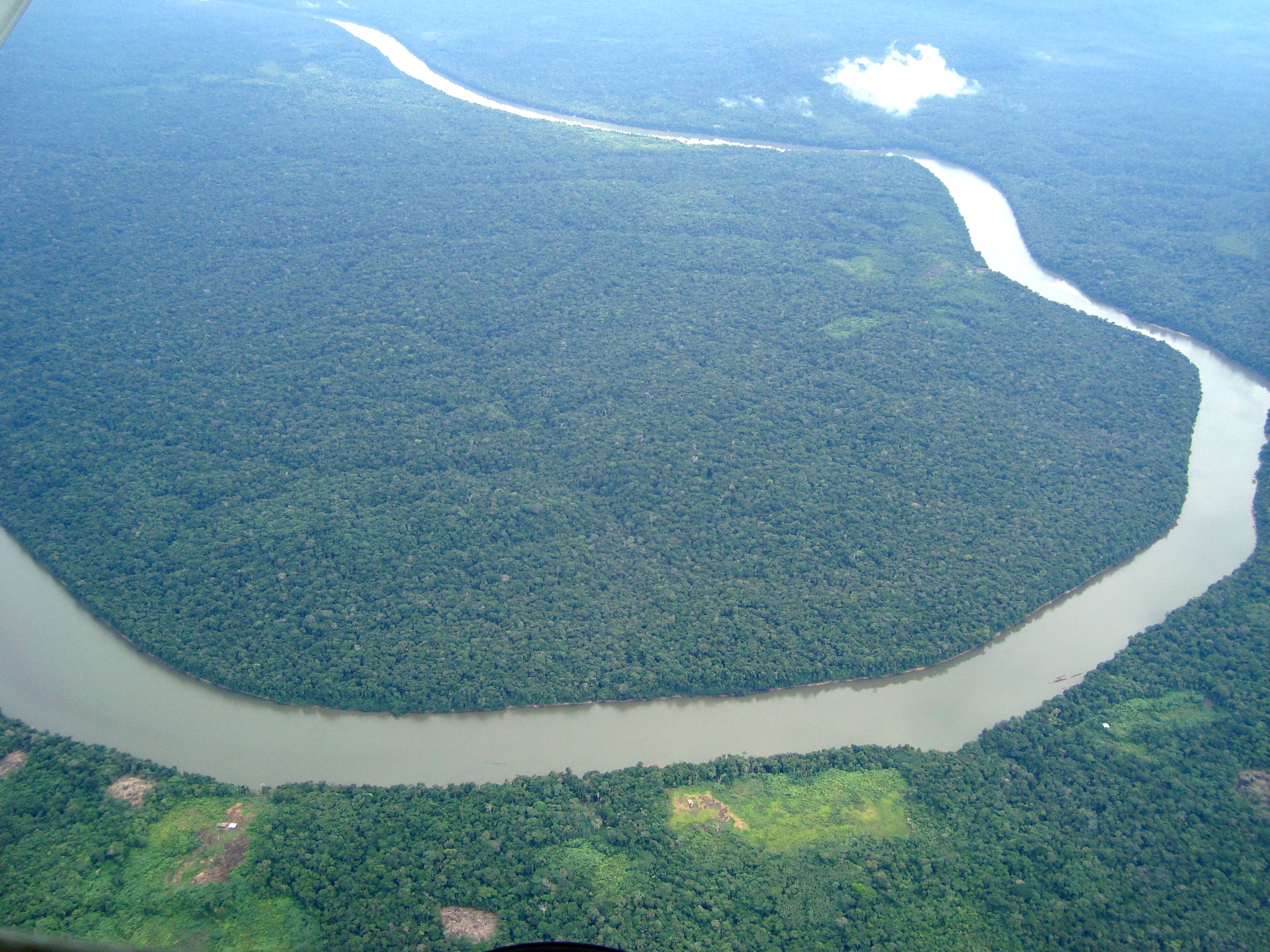
Aerial view of part of the Amazon rainforest

The Amazon basin is home to over 40,0000 species of plants. Plant growth is quite dense and its variety of animal inhabitants is comparatively high due to the heavy rainfall and the dense and extensive evergreen and coniferous forests. Little sunlight reaches the ground due to the dense roof of canopy by plants. The ground remains dark and damp and only shade-tolerant vegetation will grow here. Orchids and bromeliads exploit trees and other plants to get closer to the sunlight. They grow hanging onto the branches or tree trunks with aerial roots, not as parasites but as epiphytes. Species of tropical trees native to the Amazon include Brazil nut, rubber tree and Assai palm. The lush flora of the basin is made possible in part by the ten million tonnes of Saharan dust which crosses the Atlantic each year.

== Wildlife ==
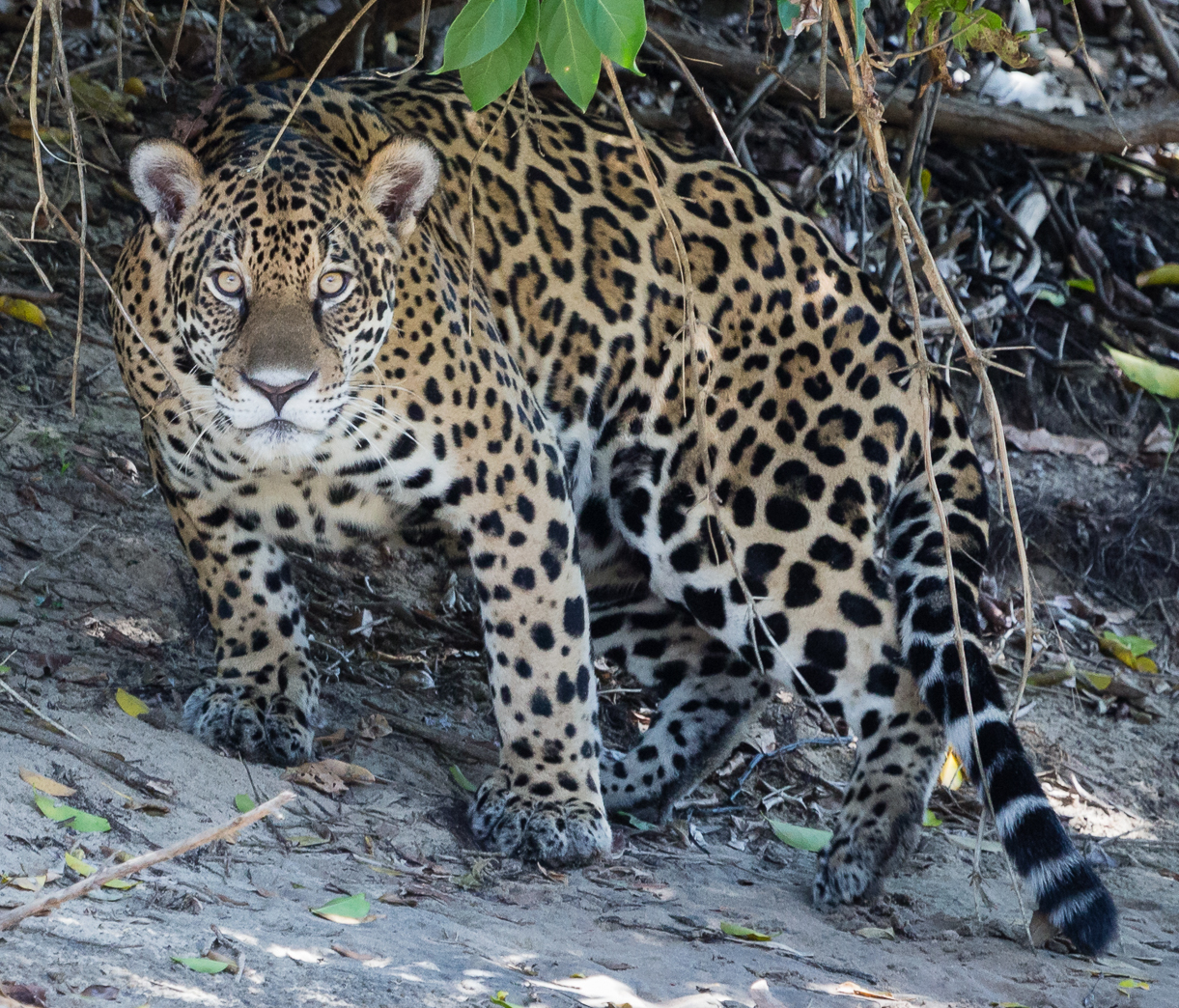
Jaguar in the area of Miranda near Amazon basin

=== Mammals ===
More than 1,400 species of mammals are found in the Amazon, the majority of which are species of bats and rodents. Its larger mammals include the jaguar, ocelot, capybara, puma, South American tapir, White-tailed deer, Amazon river dolphin, and the Amazonian manatee.

=== Birds ===
About 1,500 bird species inhabit the Amazon basin. The biodiversity of the Amazon and the sheer number of diverse bird species is given by the number of different bird families that reside in these humid forests. An example of such would be the cotinga family, to which the Guianan cock-of-the-rock belong. Birds such as toucans, and hummingbirds are also found here. Macaws are famous for duck gathering by the hundreds along the clay cliffs of the Amazon River. In the western Amazon hundreds of macaws and other parrots descend to exposed river banks to consume clay on an almost daily basis, the exception being rainy days.

=== Reptiles ===
The green anaconda inhabits the shallow waters of the Amazon and the emerald tree boa and boa constrictor live in the Amazonian tree tops.

Many reptile species are illegally collected and exported for the international pet trade. Live animals are the fourth largest commodity in the smuggling industry after drugs, diamonds and weapons.

=== Amphibians ===
More than 1,500 species of amphibians swim and are found in the Amazon. Unlike temperate frogs which are mostly limited to habitats near the water, tropical frogs are most abundant in the trees and relatively few are found near bodies of water on the forest floor. The reason for this occurrence is quite simple: frogs must always keep their skin moist since almost half of their respiration is carried out through their skin. The high humidity of the rainforest and frequent rainstorms gives tropical frogs infinitely more freedom to move into the trees and escape the many predators of rainforest waters. The differences between temperate and tropical frogs extend beyond their habitat.

=== Fish ===
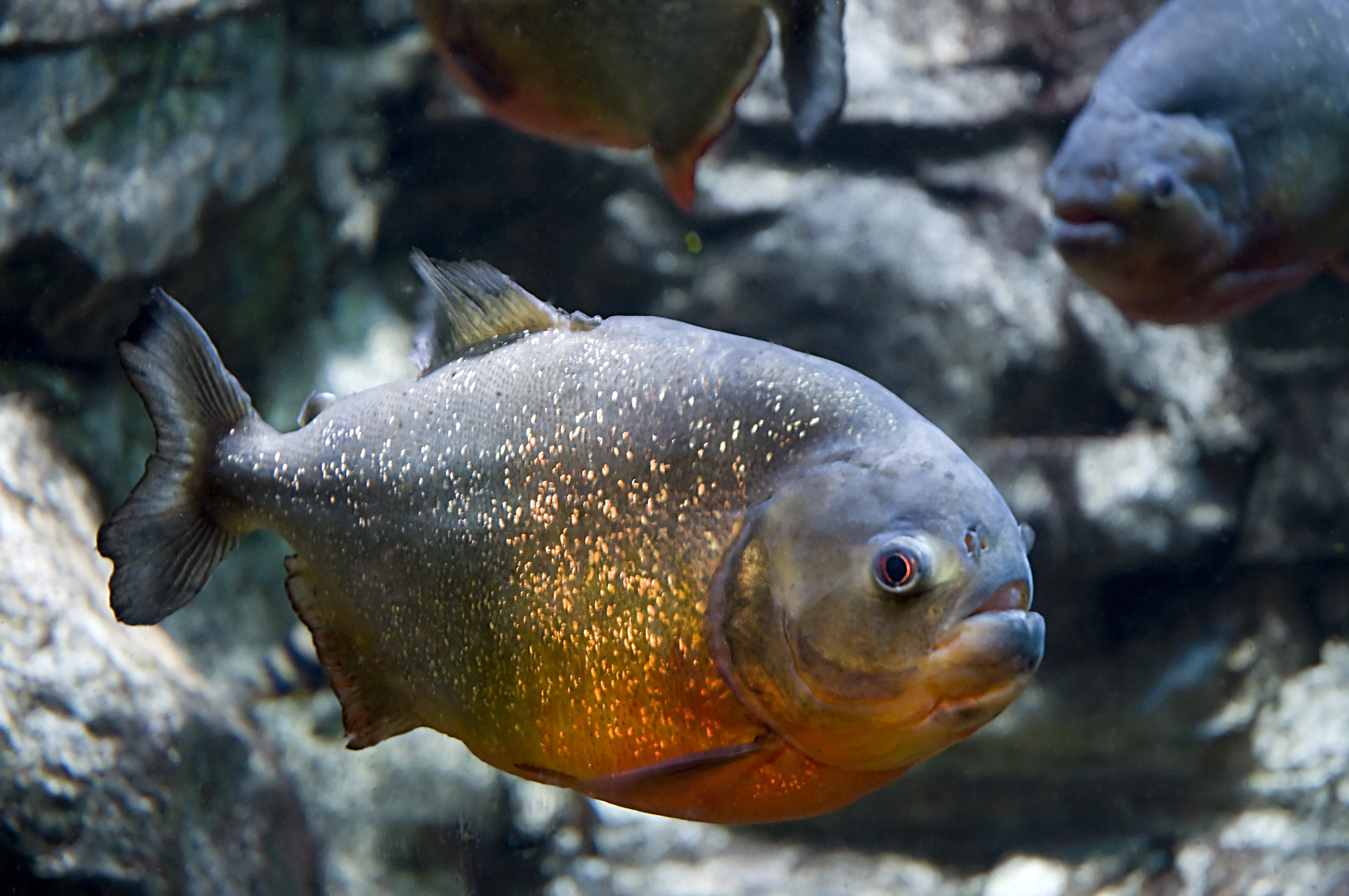
Red-bellied piranha (Pygocentrus nattereri) is a species of piranha. This species lives in the Amazon River basin, coastal rivers of northeastern Brazil, and the basins of the Paraguay, Paraná and Essequibo Rivers.

About 2,500 fish species are known from the Amazon basin and it is estimated that more than 1,000 additional undescribed species exist. This is more than any other river basin on Earth, and Amazonia is the center of diversity for Neotropical fishes. About 45% (more than 1,000 species) of the known Amazonian fish species are endemic to the basin. The remarkable species richness can in part be explained by the large differences between the various parts of the Amazon basin, resulting in many fish species that are endemic to small regions. For example, fauna in clearwater rivers differs from fauna in white and blackwater rivers, fauna in slow moving sections show distinct differences compared to that in rapids, fauna in small streams differ from that in major rivers, and fauna in shallow sections show distinct differences compared to that in deep parts. By far the most diverse orders in the Amazon are Characiformes (43% of total fish species in the Amazon) and Siluriformes (39%), but other groups with many species include Cichlidae (6%) and Gymnotiformes (3%).

In addition to major differences in behavior and ecology, Amazonian fish vary extensively in form and size. The largest, the arapaima and piraiba can reach 3 m (9.8 ft) or more in length and up to 200 kg (440 lb) in weight, making them some of the largest strict freshwater fish in the world. The bull shark and common sawfish, which have been recorded far up the Amazon, may reach even greater sizes, but they are euryhaline and often seen in marine waters. In contrast to the giants, there are Amazonian fish from several families that are less than 2 cm (0.8 in) long. The smallest are likely the Leptophilypnion sleeper gobies, which do not surpass 1 centimetre (0.4 in) and are among the smallest fish in the world. Although the true danger they represent often is greatly exaggerated, the Amazon basin is home to several feared fish species such as piranhas (including the famous red-bellied), electric eel, river stingrays and candiru.

Several cavefish species in the genus Phreatobius are found in the Amazon, as is the cave-dwelling Astroblepus pholeter in the far western part of the basin (Andean region). The Tocantins basin, arguably not part of the Amazon basin, has several other cavefish species. The deeper part of the major Amazonian rivers are always dark and a few species have adaptions similar to cavefish (reduced pigment and eyes). Among these are the knifefish Compsaraia and Orthosternarchus, some Cetopsis whale catfish (especially C. oliveirai), some Xyliphius and Micromyzon banjo catfish, and the loricariid catfish Loricaria spinulifera, L. pumila, Peckoltia pankimpuju, Panaque bathyphilus and Panaqolus nix (these five also occur in "normal" forms of shallower waters). The perhaps most unusual habitat used by Amazonian fish is land. The splash tetra is famous for laying its eggs on plants above water, keeping them moist by continuously splashing on them, the South American lungfish can survive underground in a mucous cocoon during the dry season, some small rivulid killifish can jump over land between water sources (sometimes moving relatively long distances, even uphill) and may deliberately jump onto land to escape aquatic predators, and an undescribed species of worm-like Phreatobius catfish lives in waterlogged leaf litter near (not in) streams.

Some of the major fish groups of the Amazon basin include:

- Order Gymnotiformes: Neotropical electric fishes
- Order Characiformes: characins, tetras and relatives
- Family Potamotrygonidae: river stingrays
- Family Arapaimidae: bonytongues
- Family Loricariidae: suckermouth catfishes
- Family Callichthyidae: armored catfishes
- Family Pimelodidae: pimelodid catfishes
- Family Trichomycteridae: pencil catfishes
- Family Auchenipteridae: driftwood catfishes
- Subfamily Cichlinae: pike cichlids, peacock cichlids and relatives
- Subfamily Geophaginae: Eartheaters and Neotropical dwarf cichlid
- Subfamily Poeciliinae: guppies and relatives

=== Insects ===
More than 90% of the animal species in the Amazon are insects, of which about 40% are beetles (Coleoptera constituting almost 25% of all known types of animal life-forms.)

Whereas all of Europe has some 321 butterfly species, the Manú National Park in Peru (4,000 hectare-survey) has 2,300 species, while Tambopata National Reserve (5,500 hectare-survey) has at least 1,231 species.

== Climate ==
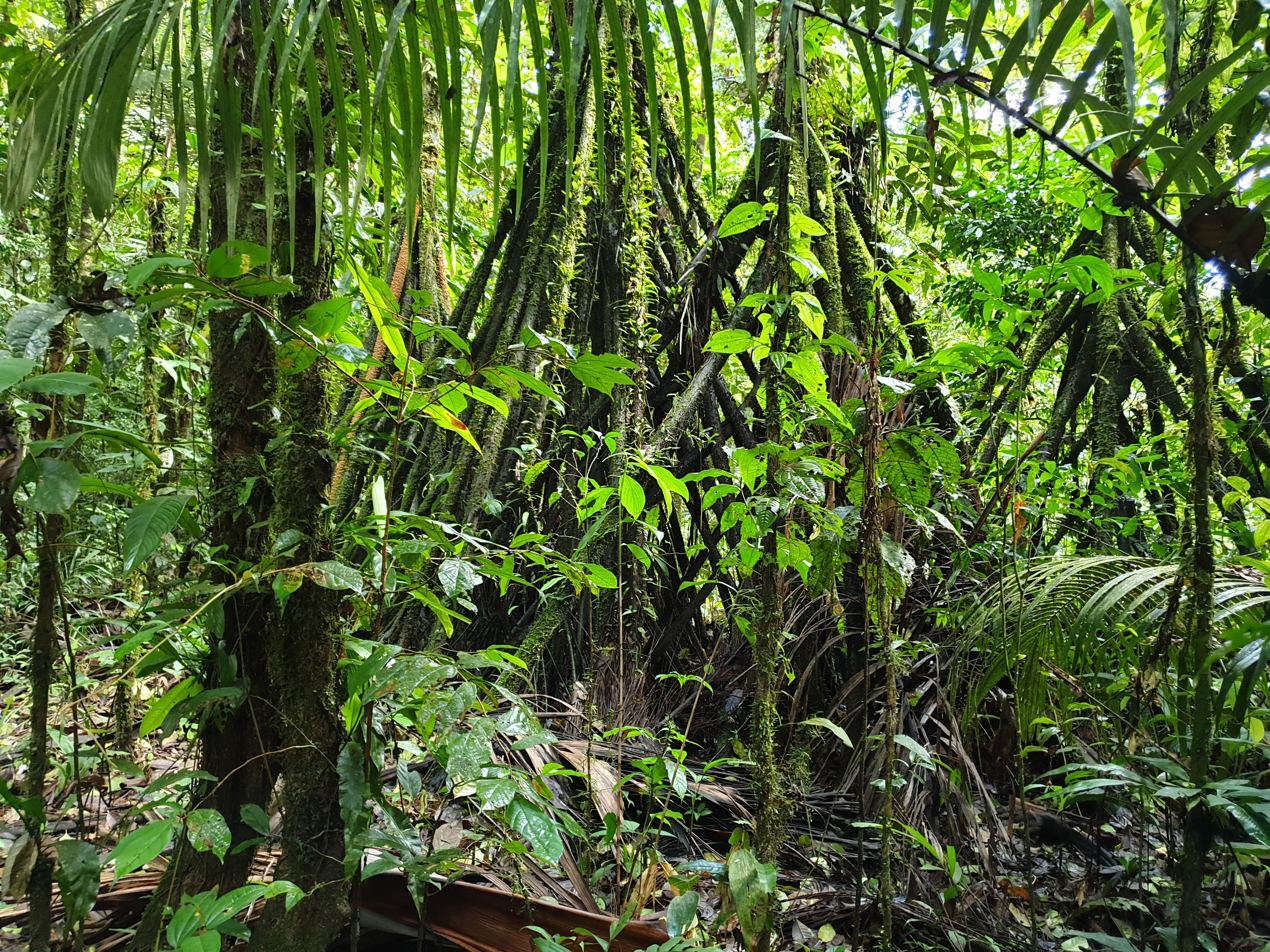
Amazon rainforest in Colombia

The Amazon River basin has a low-water season, and a wet season during which, the rivers flood the adjacent, low-lying forests. The climate of the basin is generally hot and humid. In some areas, however, the summer months (June–September) can bring cold snaps, fueled by Antarctic winds traveling along the adjacent mountain range. The average annual temperature is around 25-degree and 28 degree Celsius with little to no distinction between summer and winter season.

== Human lifestyle ==
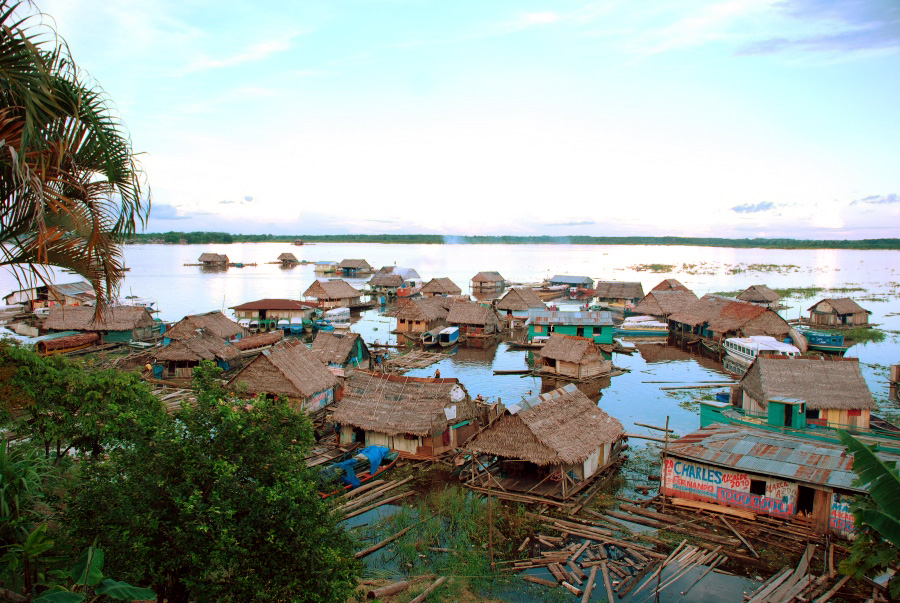
A floating village in Iquitos, Peru

Amazonia is sparsely populated. There are scattered settlements inland, but most of the population lives in a few larger cities on the banks of the Amazon and other major rivers, such as in Iquitos – Loreto in Peru, Manaus-Amazonas State, and Belém, Pará. In many regions, the forest has been cleared for soya bean plantations and ranching (the most extensive non-forest use of the land); some of the inhabitants harvest wild rubber latex, and Brazil nuts. This is a form of extractive farms, where the trees are not cut down. These are relatively sustainable operations in contrast to lumbering or agriculture dependent on clearing the rainforest. The people live in thatched houses shaped liked beehives. They also build apartment-like houses called "Maloca", with a steeply slanting roof.

== Languages ==
The most widely spoken languages in the Amazon are Portuguese and Spanish. There are hundreds of native languages still spoken in the Amazon, most of which are critically endangered.

== Indigenous peoples ==
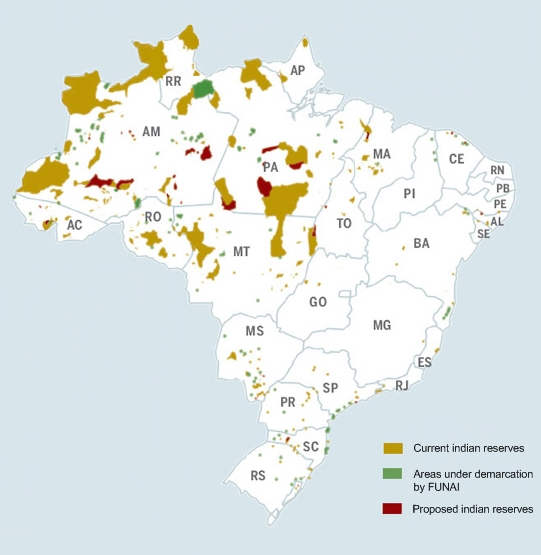
Proposed and approved Indigenous territories in Brazil as of 2008

Many tribal groups live in the Amazon basin, often in relative isolation. It is estimated 400 or more tribal groups have lived in the Amazon basin for hundreds of years with their own culture, language, and lifestyle. The total population of Amazon basin is estimated at 1.5 million distributed people. There are an estimated 100 uncontacted tribal groups. The largest organization fighting for the indigenous peoples in this area is COICA. It is a supra organization encompassing all indigenous rights organizations working in the Amazon basin area, and covers the people living in several countries.

== River commerce ==
The river is the principal path of transportation for people and produce in the regions, with transport ranging from balsa rafts and dugout canoes to hand built wooden river craft and modern steel hulled craft.

== Fisheries ==
The Amazon basin has an incredibly high diversity of species in its rivers, every year it is estimated over 500 thousand tons of fish are caught within the Amazon basin, being very hard to accurately count due to the remote nature of the majority of these fisheries. The Amazon basin consistently falls around the 6th biggest freshwater fishery in the world. These fisheries act as one of the main livelihoods for the inhabitants of the Amazon basin, giving an important food source and providing around 200,000 jobs. Of the roughly 2,500 described aquatic spices of the Amazon basin roughly 575 of these species are being exploited by fisheries. Highlighting these species being exploited, 93% of the fishery landings within the Amazon basin are upon migratory fish.

=== Commercial fisheries ===
Commercial fishing remains one of the most significantly important classifications of fisheries in the Amazon basin contributing to a large portion of local and regional economic distribution towards national markets and local supply. Commercial fishing within the Amazon generates an annual income of US$73,544,915 with the commercial fleet itself generating 62 million. Commercial fishing produces occupational opportunities for local and individuals within the region of the Amazon basin providing 23 percent of over 155,000 jobs regarding fisheries. Overharvesting poses a major threat to large species within the Amazon basin declining populations of high-value species such as Arapaima, Tambaqui, and Catfish. With overharvesting presenting this threat, the depletion of these top predatory species can inflict significant impacts upon food webs in the Amazon basin. These impacts consist of biomass increase of prey fish along with a decrease in invertebrate biomass.

However, in Bolivian Amazon regulations are set to combat overharvesting by banning fisheries during high water seasons same with Brazil banning fisheries during migratory periods as 80% of commercial landings in the Amazon are upon migratory species. Commercial fishing for Arapaima also inflicts conflict with indigenous communities in Bolivian Amazon granted 80% of commercial landings are Arapaima mostly in indigenous territories.

=== Sport fisheries ===
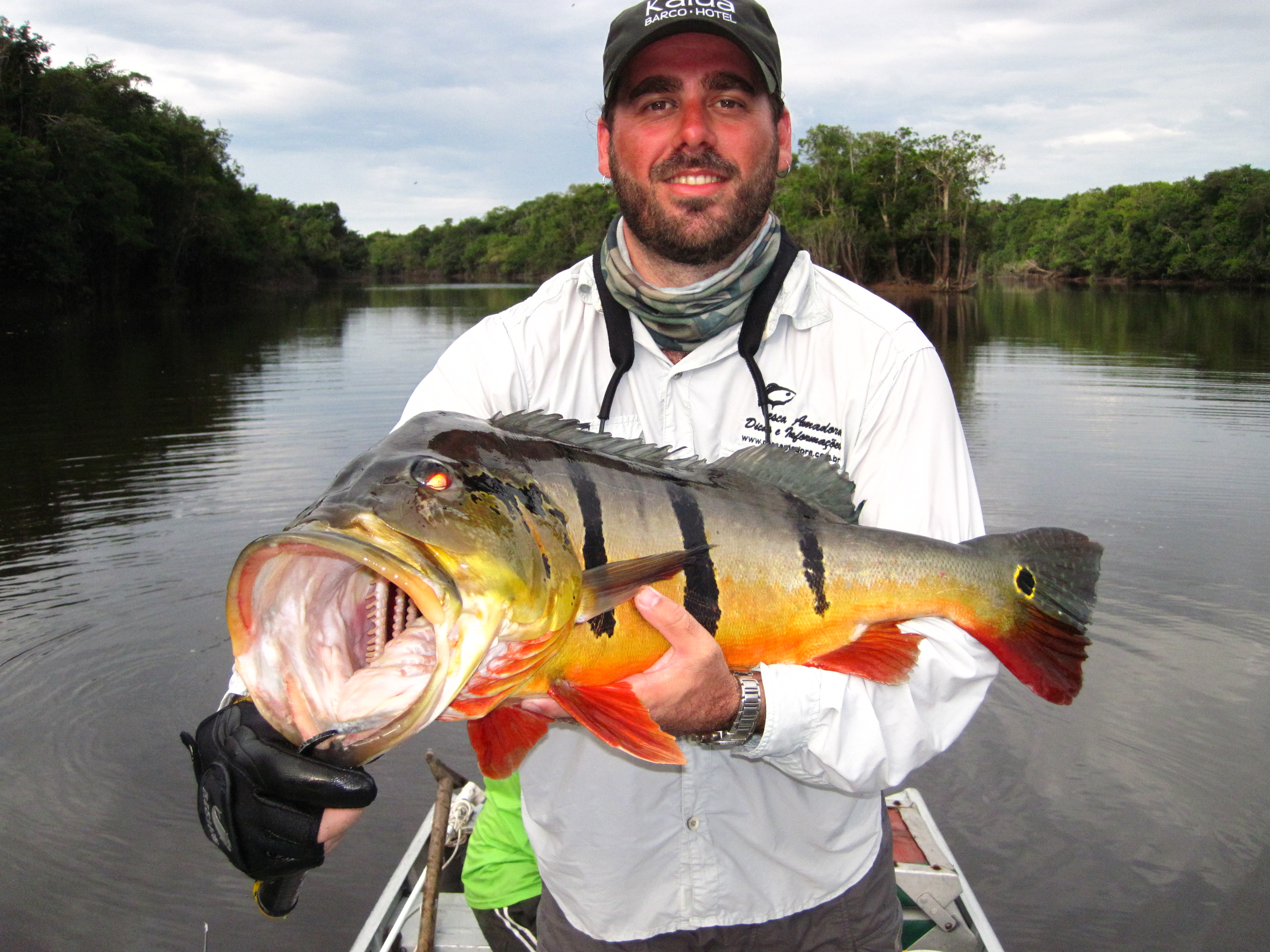
Sport fisherman holding peacock bass in the Amazon basin

Sport or recreational fishing is the act of fishing used as entertainment rather than a source of income or subsistence. Worldwide the demand for sport fishing has increased, with a new focus on eco-tourism, this demand is forecasted to continue to grow. In the Amazon basin, sport fishing mainly consists of tours, the most common target is the peacock bass, followed by species such as large migratory catfish, silver arowana, Matrinxã, pike-characins, Payara, and Dogtooth characin. The typical season for sport fishing is dependent on when the waters are low. Low waters force fish species to the main river channels and lakes, during the remainder of the year many target species inhabit the flooded forests. the months when waters are low is highly dependent on the region of the Amazon the river is in.

==== Sport fishing economy ====
Sport fishing attracts around 10,000 tourists every year directly providing an estimated 1,000 jobs to Brazilians. This generates an estimated US$400 million for Brazil's economy when including indirect spendings. Most commonly tourists will book a trip through local tourism companies. The majority of these trips take place on a hotel boat that floats along the river, although some tourism companies operate out of eco lodges, taking guest on daily excursions, these tours cost an average of US$3,000 per 7 days.

==== Impacts of sport fishing ====
Several species targeted by sport fishing in the Amazon basin have been introduced for the sport fishing industry, most notably being Peacock bass and Golden Dourado. Both of these species are native to South America, but were introduced across the Amazon basin. Both of these species are relatively large predatory species and often outcompete the local species and prey on smaller native fish species in areas where they are introduced.

Oftentimes owners of sport fishing businesses will pay off the fishers in indigenous villages to release the peacock bass they catch, deals like this often create conflict within these communities, as food scarcity is an issue in the region. Sport fishing often takes place in indigenous fishing grounds; many indigenous peoples in the Amazon basin oppose practices such as catch-and-release fishing, and the excessive use of motorboats as they believe it negatively impacts fish habitat. These rural communities has very little power in this conflict with very little government support while sport fisheries have strong lobbying efforts and in cities like Barcelos, where sport fishing has a large economic income, the sports fisheries have become intertwined with local government.

=== Ornamental fishing ===
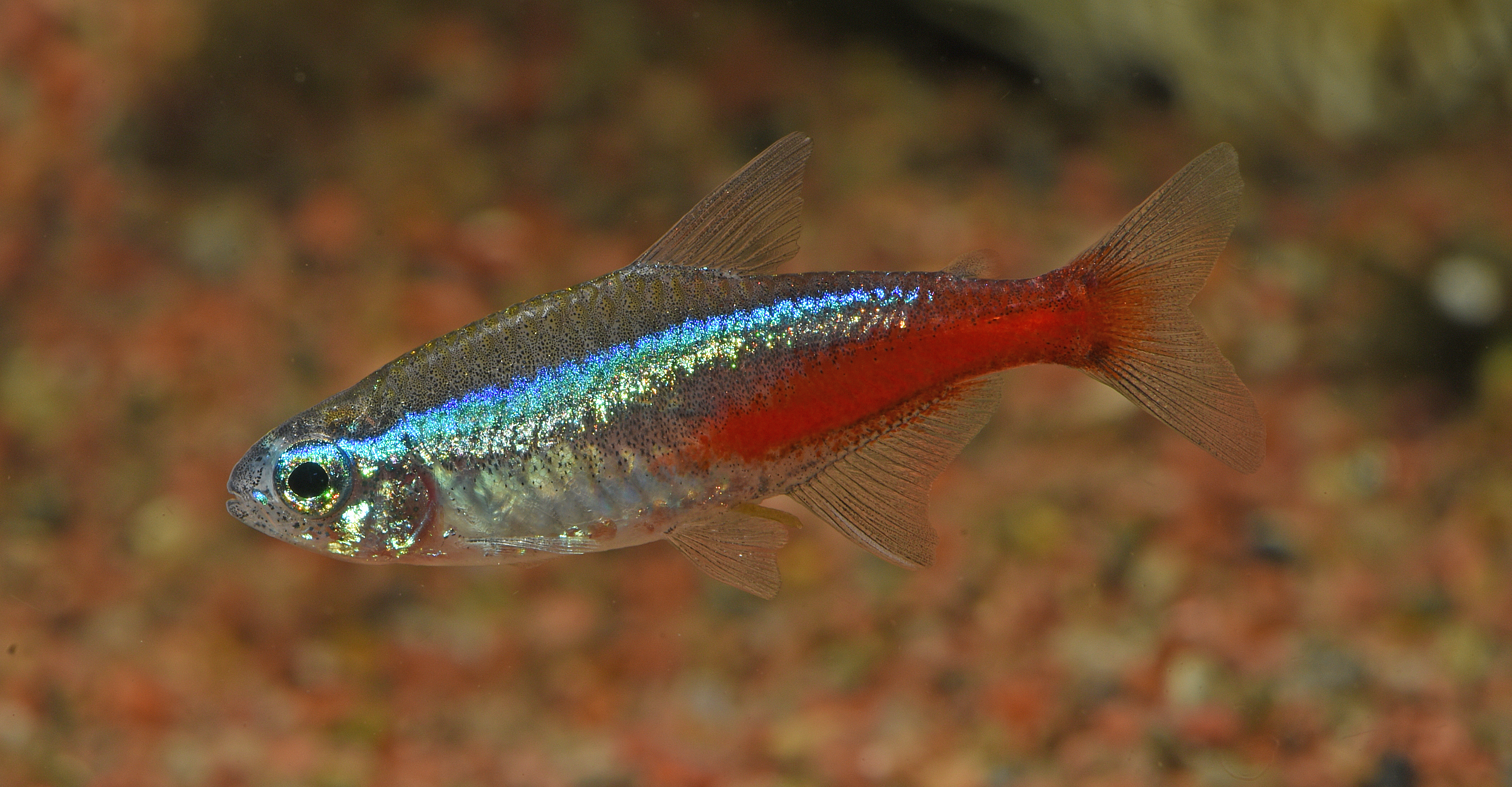
A Cardinal Tetra, the most exported ornamental fish from the Amazon basin.

The ornamental fish trade is an industry that makes around $10 billion USD profit each year worldwide in the Amazon basin there are an estimated 375 species that are target by the ornamental fish trade. The fish caught the most are Cardinal Tetra accounting for 64% of exports. Other common exports include Green neon tetra 7.5%, rummy-nose tetra 5%, Golden Otocinclus 4.6%, Hoppe's Otocinclus 2.8%, Schwartz's catfish 2.2%, Zebra Loach 1.9%, Dwarf Suckermouth Catfish 1.5%.

==== Ornamental fishing economy ====
The majority of the fish exported from the Amazon basin in the aquarium trade are exported to North America and Europe, with the majority of exports going to Germany, Taiwan and the United States of America. The Amazonas State of Brazil exported an estimated $2.5 million USD of ornamental fish between 2006 and 2014. When compared to other forms of income in the Amazon basin ornamental fishing pays well, providing average daily wages of close to $19 USD per day, as compared to other occupations in the region which on average pay slightly over $4 USD per day. In the Peruvian Amazon ornamental fisheries provide nearly 10,000 people with income, many of these people being intermediaries, expedition workers, independent collectors and rural fishers. Although being very profitable in comparison to other occupations it is not very accessible to many people as around $2,600 has to be invested into new gear to start ornamental fishing. Furthermore, the income can be very unstable with the demand changing often and the target species can be hard to find, especially during times when the rivers are flooded as they often reside in the flooded forests.

==== Impact of ornamental fishing ====
Within the Amazon basin there are 12 know introduced species that have been associated with the aquarium trade, most notably the guppy (poecilia reticulata). Although there is little research done on the impacts of these species in the region, non-native species used in the ornamental fishing trade have potential to be harmful to local ecosystems. The silver arowana is a species heavily targeted by the aquarium trade with high demand in Asia where it is called the dragon fish. The silver arowana is very suspectable to over exploitation as it has a long life cycle, with a late sexual maturity and produces relatively few eggs when it spawns. The harvesting method of silver arowana is unsuitable as males care for eggs by mouth brooding. Fishers will kill these males and take the eggs from there mouth to sell. In areas such as Colombia, overfishing has caused the populations to become depleted. Between ornamental fisherman there is conflict over the price tetra are sold for as many traders want to raise the price due to the high demand. According to research that was done in the Rio Negro region, conflict between ornamental and other fisherman was limited, because there is little overlap of the spices they target and locations they fish at, however conflict can occur when territories do overlap with those of other fishers.

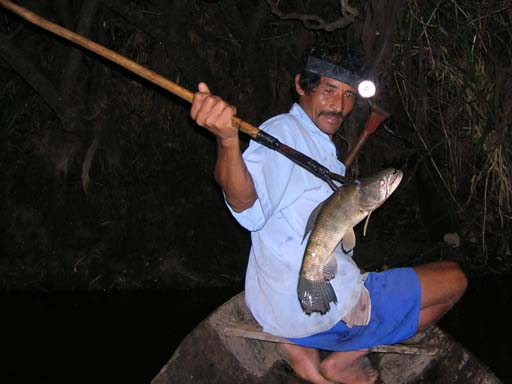
A man using a leister to catch a catfish in the Peruvian Amazon.

=== Subsistence fishing ===
Subsistence fishing is the practice of using fishing as means to provide food for an individual, their family and community. In the Amazon basin there are an estimated 2.2 million indigenous people. Fishing is one of the most important forms of livelihood for the indigenous communities of the Amazon basin, with the average resident of the Brazilian Amazon consuming 23 kg (50.7 lbs) of fish each year. For subsistence fishers, gillnets are the most used method of fishing, with methods such as fishing poles and cast nets also being commonly used, other methods such as bow and arrow, beach seine, leister, handline, longline and harpoon are used more rarely. These fishers mostly target species such as tambaqui, tacunaré, curimatã and pacu, there are many other presences across the Amazon basin depending on region.

Subsistence fishing is predominantly the main source for fishing in Peru, Bolivia, Venezuela, and Ecuador regarding the Amazon basin. Representing significant proportions of subsistence fishing out of total landings, Peru and Bolivia produce more than 50% of their total landings from subsistence fishing, while Venezuela and Ecuador produce almost 100% from their total landings. However, subsistence fishing has barely reached half of the maximum catch level in the Amazon basin's floodplains.

==== Pollution ====
Large quantities of mercury have entered rivers as a result of the many gold mining operations within the Amazon basin. This contamination has caused many fish species to have amounts of mercury that exceed the heathy limit, thus many people within indigenous fishing villages communities in the Amazon basin have heightened mercury exposure. In Adults High chronic exposure to high amounts of mercury can lead to mental and neurological and cognitive issues such as depression, irritability, motor issues, and more. Some research has shown suggests there is a long link between mercury consumption and the development of diseases such as Parkinson's and Alzheimer's. Mercury contamination can also lead to a cardiovascular issues such as systolic blood pressure and heart attack. The highest risk from the mercury poisoning is to children and childbearing women as it can cause fetal and early childhood development issues such as motor and sensory losses and cognitive loss.

== Agriculture ==
Seasonal floods excavate and redistribute nutrient-rich silt onto beaches and islands, enabling dry-season riverside agriculture of rice, beans, and corn on the river's shoreline without the addition of fertilizer, with additional slash and burn agriculture on higher floodplains. Fishing provides additional food year-round, and free-range chickens need little or no food beyond what they can forage locally. Charcoal made largely from forest and shoreline deadfall is produced for use in urban areas. Exploitation of bushmeat, particularly deer and turtles is common.

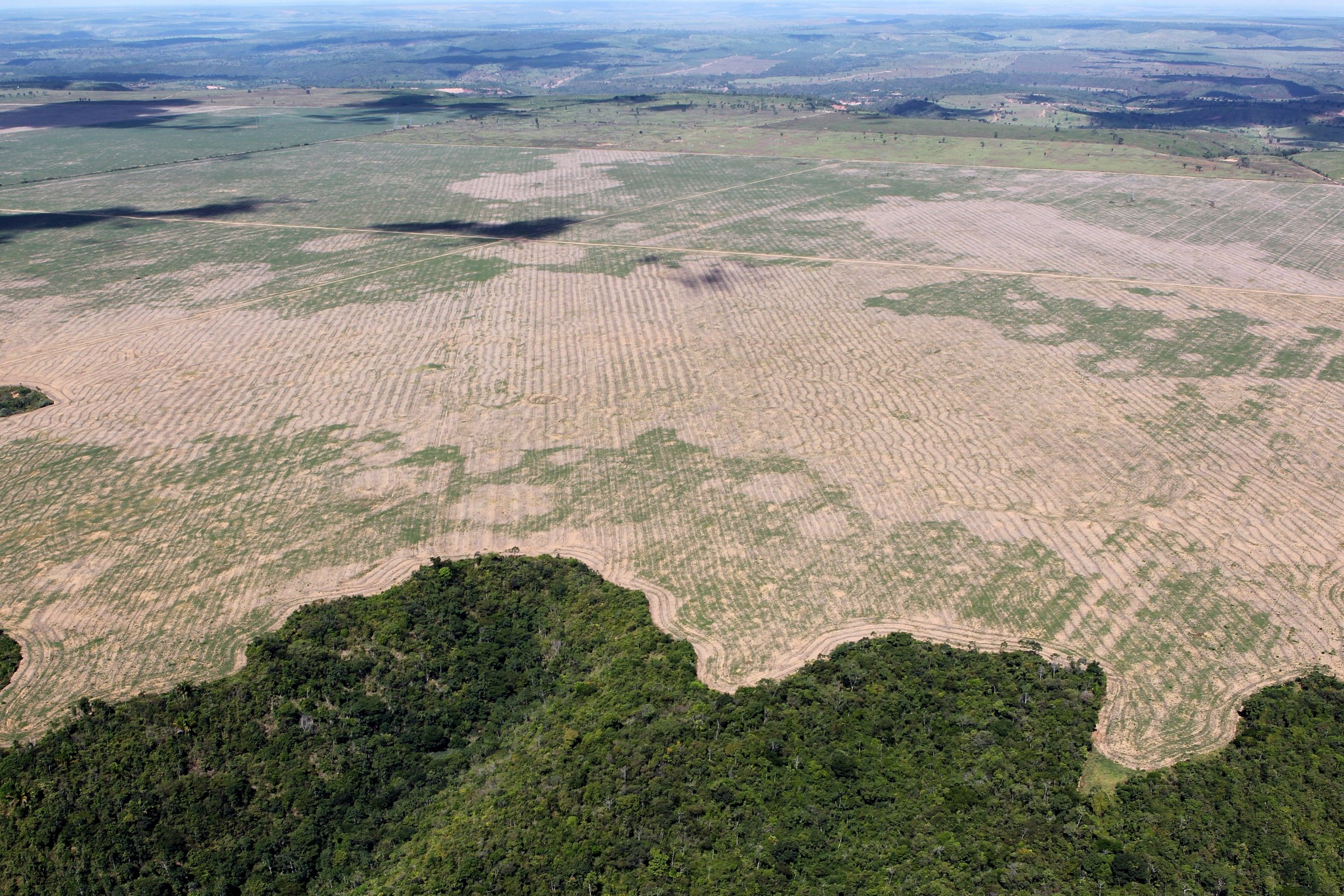
Deforestation and increased road-building bring human encroachment upon wild areas, increased resource extraction and threats to biodiversity.

Extensive deforestation, particularly in Brazil, is leading to the extinction of known and unknown species, reducing biological diversity and adversely impacting soil, water, and air quality. A final part of the deforestation process is the large-scale production of charcoal for industrial processes such as steel manufacturing. Soils within the region are generally shallow and cannot be used for more than a few seasons without the addition of imported fertilizers and chemicals.

== Global ecological role / Function for climate change ==
"Over past 20 years (2021), the Brazilian Amazon emitted 13% more CO_{2} than it absorbed".

Amazon vegetation holds around 56.8 billion metric tons of carbon above ground. The slash and burn cycle is causing the Amazon to release more carbon than it takes in.

The Amazon basin holds 10% of the world's biodiversity and about 15% of the worlds river discharge. The Amazon functions as a carbon sink due to photosynthesis where carbon dioxide is converted into oxygen. The role the vegetation plays in the water cycle is very important. 50% to 80% of the water remains locked within the basin due to the complex role vegetation, rivers and the atmosphere play with each other. Without trees the Amazon basin's ability to hold onto the water will disappear and will lead to Desertification.

"Amazon biodiversity also plays a critical role as part of global systems, influencing the global carbon cycle and thus climate change, as well as hemispheric hydrological systems, serving as an important anchor for South American climate and rainfall. It also produces 20% oxygen of the Earth."

== See also ==
- Amazon biome
- Amazon Cooperation Treaty Organization
- Amazon Conservation Association
- Amazon Conservation Team
- Deforestation of the Amazon rainforest
- Llanos de Moxos
- Llanos de Moxos (archaeology)
- Ucayali Peneplain
- Pre-Columbian agriculture in the Amazon basin
