= Panaque bathyphilus =

Conservation status
- Least Concern (IUCN 3.1)

Scientific classification
- Kingdom: Animalia
- Phylum: Chordata
- Class: Actinopterygii
- Order: Siluriformes
- Family: Loricariidae
- Subfamily: Hypostominae
- Genus: Panaque
- Species: P. bathyphilus

Binomial name
- Panaque bathyphilus Lujan & Chamon, 2008

Species of fish

Panaque bathyphilus is an Amazonian species of armoured catfish from the family Loricariidae. The holotype of the species was collected in the Solimões River, upstream of its confluence with the Purus River. This species has been known in the aquarium trade, at least since 1992, as papa panaque or under the L-number code L090. It reaches up to about 40 cm (16 in) in length.

This species, Peckoltia pankimpuju, Panaqolus nix, Loricaria spinulifera and L. pumila are the only loricariid catfish species known to occur in a deep water form with reduced pigment and eyes (similar to cavefish), and another "normal" form in shallower waters. P. bathyphilus and a few other loricariid catfish species of the mainstream of large South American rivers have greatly elongated streamers on their tail. It is speculated that this may serve as an early warning system against the large predatory catfish that also roam their habitat. Positioned with the head towards the water current, as typical of loricariid catfish, the long tail streamers of P. bathyphilus are the first to be contacted by a large predator that hunts against the current, perhaps allowing it to escape.
