= Pseudoqolus =

Conservation status
- Data Deficient (IUCN 3.1)

Scientific classification
- Kingdom: Animalia
- Phylum: Chordata
- Class: Actinopterygii
- Division: Teleostei
- Order: Siluriformes
- Family: Loricariidae
- Subfamily: Hypostominae
- Tribe: Ancistrini
- Genus: Pseudoqolus; Lujan,Cramer, Covain, Fisch-Muller & López-Fernández, 2017
- Species: P. koko

Binomial name
- Pseudoqolus koko (Fisch-Muller & Covain, 2012)

Synonyms
- Panaqolus koko Fisch-Muller & Covain, 2012

Species of catfish

Pseudoqolus is a monospecific genus of freshwater ray-finned fish belonging to the family Loricariidae, the suckermouth armoured catfishes, and the subfamily Hypostominae, the suckermouth catfishes. The only species in this genus is Pseudoqolus koko. This catfish is found in northern South America where occurs in the upper Maroni basin in French Guiana and Suriname. It has been found on or near stony substrates in the main river channel at a depth of around 2 m (6 ft 7 in). The species has been collected alongside multiple other loricariid species, including Hemiancistrus medians, Peckoltia otali, Pseudancistrus barbatus, Harttia guianensis, Loricaria cataphracta, and Rineloricaria stewarti. It is noted that the gut contents of one specimen of this species contained primarily spicules and sponge fragments, indicating that it may feed on freshwater sponges. The species reaches a standard length of 9 cm (3.5 in).

Pseudoqolus koko was originally described as a member of the genus Panaqolus (a genus which is sometimes thought to be a subgenus of Panaque) in 2012, although it was reclassified as a member of the monotypic genus Pseudoqolus by Nathan K. Lujan, Christian A. Cramer, Raphael Covain, Sonia Fisch-Muller, and Hernán López-Fernández following a 2017 molecular phylogenetic analysis. P. koko has been stated to be morphologically, ecologically, and biogeographically distinct enough to warrant placement in this genus instead of Panaqolus.
