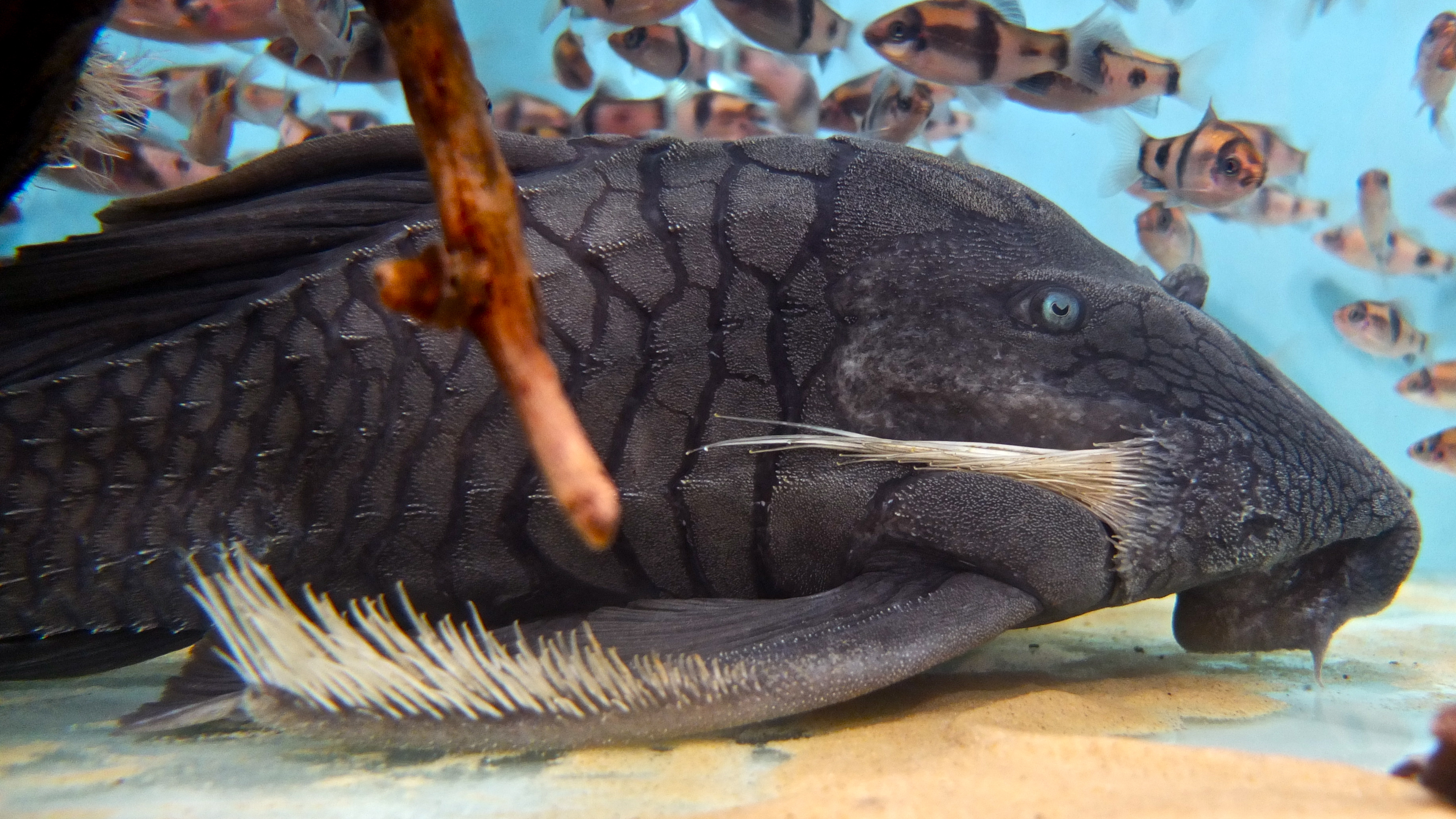
- A large (48cm/19") adult Panaque suttonorum in an aquarium. Taken at Pier Aquatics, UK.

Conservation status
- Data Deficient (IUCN 3.1)

Scientific classification
- Kingdom: Animalia
- Phylum: Chordata
- Class: Actinopterygii
- Order: Siluriformes
- Family: Loricariidae
- Subfamily: Hypostominae
- Genus: Panaque
- Species: P. suttonorum

Binomial name
- Panaque suttonorum Schultz, 1944

Synonyms
- Panaque suttoni Schultz, 1944

= Panaque suttonorum =

Species of fish

Panaque suttonorum, commonly known as the blue-eye panaque, is a species of freshwater fish from the South American catfish family Loricariidae. It is endemic to the Maracaibo Basin in Venezuela. In the wild, the species feeds on algae and reaches 28 cm (11 inches) SL, although it may grow larger in captivity.

In 2010, P. suttonorum was reevaluated and considered to be a sister species of Panaque cochliodon, due to the similarities between the two.
