= Loricaria clavipinna =

Conservation status
- Least Concern (IUCN 3.1)

Scientific classification
- Kingdom: Animalia
- Phylum: Chordata
- Class: Actinopterygii
- Order: Siluriformes
- Family: Loricariidae
- Genus: Loricaria
- Species: L. clavipinna

Binomial name
- Loricaria clavipinna Fowler, 1940

Species of catfish

Loricaria clavipinna is a species of freshwater ray-finned fish belonging to the family Loricariidae, the suckermouth armored catfishes, and the subfamily Loricariinae, the mailed catfishes. This catfish occurs in South America where it is found in the western part of the Amazon basin in Peru and Colombia, reports from Brazil require confirmation. This species reaches a standard length of 18 cm (7.1 in) and is believed to be a facultative air-breather.
