= Hypostomus ventromaculatus =

Scientific classification
- Kingdom: Animalia
- Phylum: Chordata
- Class: Actinopterygii
- Order: Siluriformes
- Family: Loricariidae
- Genus: Hypostomus
- Species: H. ventromaculatus

Binomial name
- Hypostomus ventromaculatus Boeseman, 1968

Species of catfish

Hypostomus ventromaculatus, commonly known as the wara wara, is a species of catfish in the family Loricariidae. It is native to South America, where it occurs in the coastal drainages of the Guianas, ranging from the Oyapock to the Suriname River, in French Guiana, Suriname, and Brazil.

Hypostomus ventromaculatus is known to occur in the lower reaches of rivers near and in brackish water, being particularly abundant in estuaries. It is typically found in environments with dead tree trunks and flooded vegetation, although it is also known from the muddy bottoms of banks dominated by the plant Montrichardia arborescens, where it is known to coexist with Loricaria cataphracta and Pimelodus blochii. It is believed to be a facultative air-breather, using its stomach as an accessory breathing organ. It is known to feed primarily on algae, although it also consumes protozoa, rotifers, nematodes, and small arthropods. The species reaches 25 cm (9.8 inches) in standard length.
