= Panaqolus gnomus =

Conservation status
- Least Concern (IUCN 3.1)

Scientific classification
- Kingdom: Animalia
- Phylum: Chordata
- Class: Actinopterygii
- Order: Siluriformes
- Family: Loricariidae
- Genus: Panaqolus
- Species: P. gnomus

Binomial name
- Panaqolus gnomus (Schaefer & D. J. Stewart, 1993)

Synonyms
- Panaque gnomus Schaefer & D.J. Stewart, 1993

Species of catfish

Panaqolus gnomus, the dwarf panaque, is a species of freshwater ray-finned fish belonging to the family Loricariidae, the suckermouth armored catfishes, and the subfamily Hypostominae, the suckermouth catfishes. This catfish occurs in the basins of the Pastaza River and the Marañón River in Ecuador and Peru, and in the Ucayali River drainage in Peru. This species reaches a standard length of 7.1 cm (2.8 in). It is the type species of the genus Panaqolus, which was historically considered to be a clade of small-sized species within the genus Panaque, hence the common name of this species.
