= Panaque schaeferi =

Conservation status
- Least Concern (IUCN 3.1)

Scientific classification
- Kingdom: Animalia
- Phylum: Chordata
- Class: Actinopterygii
- Order: Siluriformes
- Family: Loricariidae
- Subfamily: Hypostominae
- Genus: Panaque
- Species: P. schaeferi

Binomial name
- Panaque schaeferi Lujan, Hidalgo & Stewart, 2010

Species of fish

Panaque schaeferi is a freshwater species of fish from the South American armoured catfish family Loricariidae. Panaque schaeferi is widely distributed throughout the upper Amazon (Solimões River) in Peruvian and Ecuadorian rivers, and it has been observed as far down as Santarém, Brazil. Growing to at least 60 cm (23.6 inches) SL, it is one of the largest, and likely one of the heaviest species of Loricariid. It has been known in the aquarium trade since at least 1996 under various names such as 'Titanic pleco' and 'Volkswagen pleco' (due to its resemblance to the VW Beetle car), in addition to L203 and LDA065 under the L-number code. Juveniles are often confused with Panaque bathyphilus and erroneously called L090c.

Panaque schaeferi is named in honor of Scott A. Schaefer of the American Museum of Natural History. Additionally, he is the ichthyological editor of Copeia for his many contributions to ichthyology in general, and in particular to the understanding of the Loricarioidea.

Panaque schaeferi eats mainly wood from trees that have roots exposed into the river. As there are not many nutrients available in the wood itself, scientists believe that they gain nutrition due to all the microorganisms that live on the surface of the bark. They have specialized teeth, different than other catfish species, to better eat wood. Their excrement looks like sawdust.
