= Ucayali (disambiguation) =

Ucayali may refer to:

- Ucayali River, a river in Peru
- Ucayali Region, one of the 25 regions of Peru
- Ucayali Province, a province in Loreto region in Peru
- Ucayali Peneplain, an erosion surface in the Amazon basin

== See also ==
- Ucayali moist forests
- Scolomys ucayalensis, also called Ucayali spiny mouse
