= Panaqolus purusiensis =

Conservation status
- Least Concern (IUCN 3.1)

Scientific classification
- Kingdom: Animalia
- Phylum: Chordata
- Class: Actinopterygii
- Order: Siluriformes
- Family: Loricariidae
- Genus: Panaqolus
- Species: P. purusiensis

Binomial name
- Panaqolus purusiensis (LaMonte, 1935)

Synonyms
- Panaque purusiensis LaMonte, 1935

Species of catfish

Panaqolus purusiensis is a species of freshwater ray-finned fish belonging to the family Loricariidae, the suckermouth armored catfishes, and the subfamily Hypostominae, the suckermouth catfishes. This catfish is known to occur in the Purus River basin, in Brazil with records from the triple frontier region of Brazil, Colombia and Peru, and from the middle Amazon River basin. This species reaches a standard length of 13 cm (5.1 in). P. purusiensis was first formally described as Panaque prusiensis in 1935 by the American ichthyologist Francesca LaMonte with its Type locality (biology) given as near the mouth of Rio Macauhan, a tributary of River Yaco (or Iaco), which is a tributary of the Purus River, at 9°20'S, 69°W" in Brazil. It was redescribed in 2014 by Christian A. Cramer due to a lack of information on the species from the original description, which was based on a single specimen.
