= Loricaria luciae =

Conservation status
- Least Concern (IUCN 3.1)

Scientific classification
- Kingdom: Animalia
- Phylum: Chordata
- Class: Actinopterygii
- Order: Siluriformes
- Family: Loricariidae
- Genus: Loricaria
- Species: L. luciae

Binomial name
- Loricaria luciae Thomas, Rodriguez, Froehlich & R. M. C. Castro, 2013

Species of catfish

Loricaria luciae, sometimes known as Lucia's whiptail or the marbled whiptail catfish, is a species of freshwater ray-finned fish belonging to the family Loricariidae, the suckermouth armored catfishes, and the subfamily Loricariinae, the mailed catfishes. This catfish is found in South America, where it occurs in the Paraguay River basin (including the Miranda River, the Aquidabán River, the Tebicuary River, the Rio Negro, and the Pantanal in Argentina, Bolivia, Brazil, and Paraguay, ranging south to the Paraguay's confluence with the Paraná River. It is typically found in habitats with flowing water, ranging in size from arroyos to large rivers, where it generally occurs at a depth of less than 1.5 m (5 ft) in environments with soft substrates. It is sometimes seen in riffles and blackwater areas. The species reaches 18.9 cm (7.4 in) in standard length and is believed to be a facultative air-breather. Its specific name, luciae, honours Lucia Helena Rapp Py-Daniel of the National Institute of Amazonian Research for her contributions to loricariid taxonomy and systematics.
