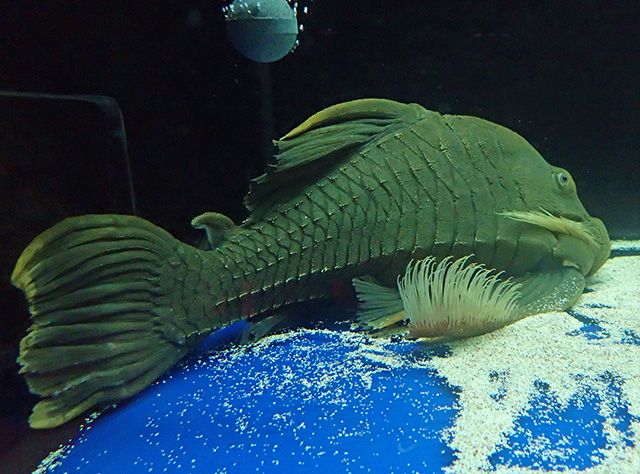

Conservation status
- Least Concern (IUCN 3.1)

Scientific classification
- Kingdom: Animalia
- Phylum: Chordata
- Class: Actinopterygii
- Order: Siluriformes
- Family: Loricariidae
- Subfamily: Hypostominae
- Genus: Panaque
- Species: P. titan

Binomial name
- Panaque titan Lujan, Hidalgo & D. J. Stewart, 2010

= Panaque titan =

Species of fish

Panaque titan is a species of freshwater fish from the South American armoured catfish family Loricariidae. It is known from several rivers in the Napo River basin in Ecuador, where it was perhaps first encountered in 1975, although it was not scientifically described until 2010. This species reaches a standard length of 39.4 cm (15.5 in).

In the aquarium trade, there have been thought to be two forms of fish that resemble P. titan; Panaque sp. L191 from the Caquetá River in Colombia and Panaque sp. L418 from the Huallaga River in Peru.

As of May 2022, L-418 is the L-number currently associated with this species, whereas L-191 corresponds with a different, seemingly undescribed Panaque species.
