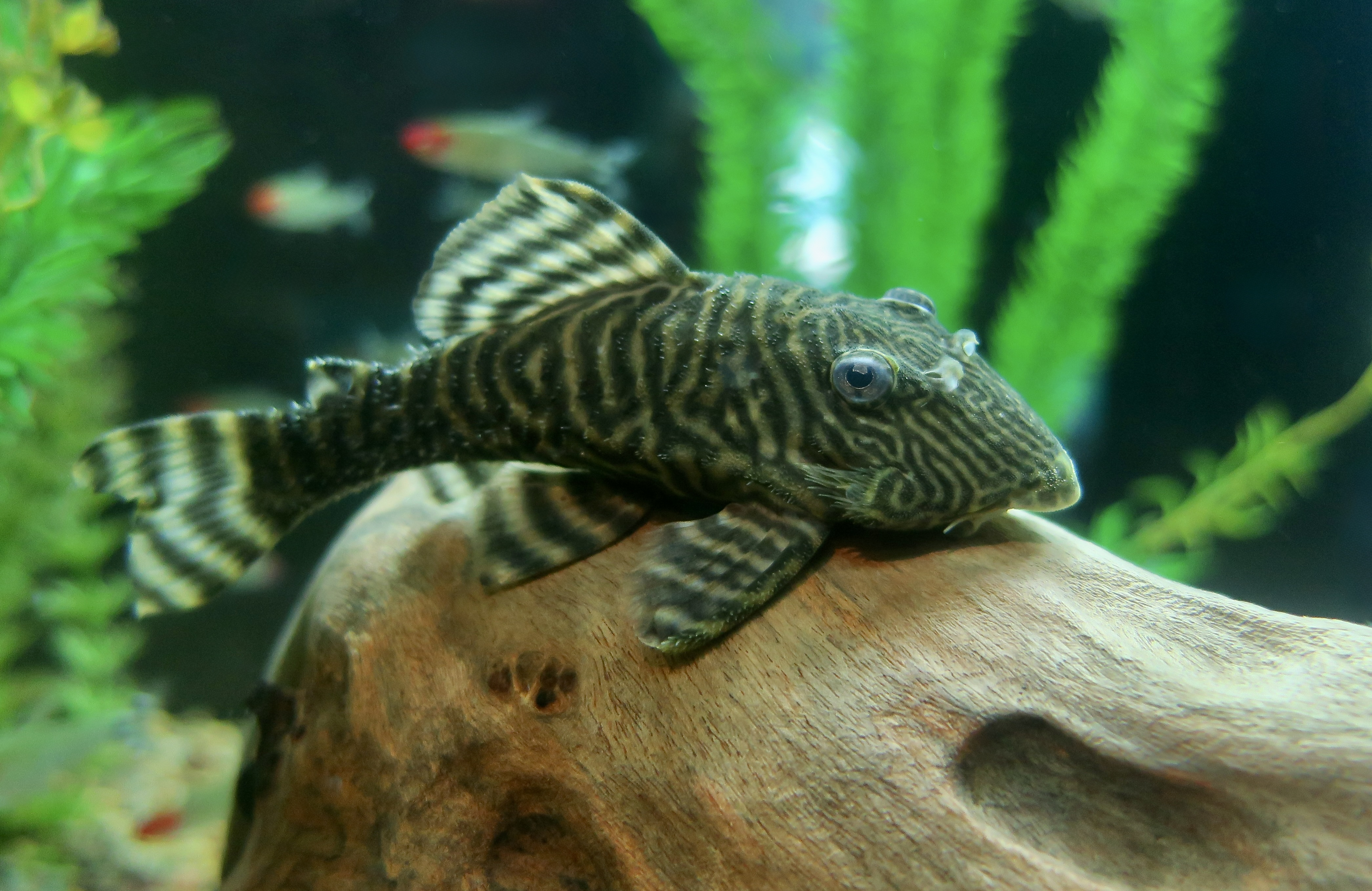
- At New York Aquarium.

Conservation status
- Least Concern (IUCN 3.1)

Scientific classification
- Kingdom: Animalia
- Phylum: Chordata
- Class: Actinopterygii
- Division: Teleostei
- Order: Siluriformes
- Family: Loricariidae
- Genus: Panaqolus
- Species: P. changae

Binomial name
- Panaqolus changae (Chockley & Armbruster, 2002)

Synonyms
- Panaque changae Chockley & Armbruster, 2002

= Panaqolus changae =

Species of catfish

Panaqolus changae is a species of freshwater ray-finned fish belonging to the family Loricariidae, the suckermouth armored catfishes, and the subfamily Hypostominae, the suckermouth catfishes. This catfish is endemic to Peru, where it occurs in the basins of the upper Yurua River and the Momón River. The species reaches a standard length of 8.5 cm (3.3 in). The specific name, changae, honours the Peruvian ichthyologist Fonchii Chang, recognising her conbtributions to the study of the family Loricariidae. It appears in the aquarium trade, where it is referred to either as the Iquitos tiger pleco, referencing the fact that the species is known to occur near the city of Iquitos, or by its L-number, which is L-226.
