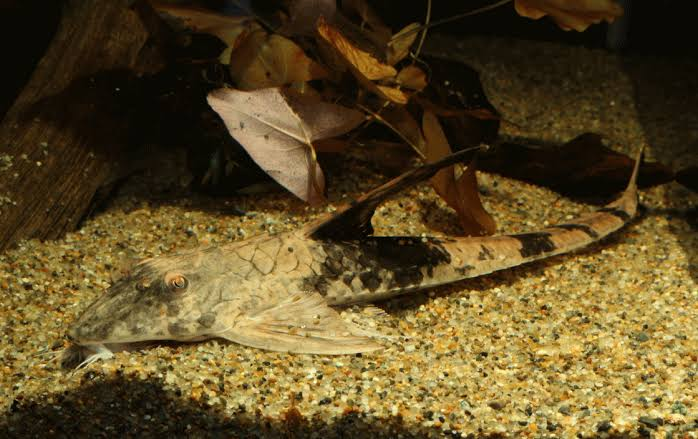

Conservation status
- Least Concern (IUCN 3.1)

Scientific classification
- Kingdom: Animalia
- Phylum: Chordata
- Class: Actinopterygii
- Order: Siluriformes
- Family: Loricariidae
- Genus: Loricaria
- Species: L. simillima

Binomial name
- Loricaria simillima Regan, 1904

= Loricaria simillima =

Species of catfish

Loricaria simillima is a species of freshwater ray-finned fish belonging to the family Loricariidae, the suckermouth armored catfishes, and the subfamily Loricariinae, the mailed catfishes. This catfish occurs in the basins of the Amazon River, the Orinoco, and the Río de la Plata in Argentina, Brazil, Colombia, Ecuador, Guyana, Paraguay, Peru, Uruguay and Venezuela. This species reaches a standard length of 26.4 cm (10.4 in) and is believed to be a facultative air-breather.

Loricaria simillima appears in the aquarium trade, where it is often referred to as the marbled whiptail.
