= Panaqolus dentex =

Conservation status
- Least Concern (IUCN 3.1)

Scientific classification
- Kingdom: Animalia
- Phylum: Chordata
- Class: Actinopterygii
- Order: Siluriformes
- Family: Loricariidae
- Genus: Panaqolus
- Species: P. dentex

Binomial name
- Panaqolus dentex (Günther, 1868)

Synonyms
- Chaetostomus dentex Günther, 1868; Panaque dentex (Günther, 1868)

Species of catfish

Panaqolus dentex is a species of freshwater ray-finned fish belonging to the family Loricariidae, the suckermouth armored catfishes, and the subfamily Hypostominae, the suckermouth catfishes. This catfish is found in the Napo, Pastaza and Marañón drainages in Ecuador and Peru, and in the Ucayali River basin in Peru. This species reaches a standard length of 8 cm (3.1 in).
