= Loricaria piracicabae =

Conservation status
- Least Concern (IUCN 3.1)

Scientific classification
- Kingdom: Animalia
- Phylum: Chordata
- Class: Actinopterygii
- Order: Siluriformes
- Family: Loricariidae
- Genus: Loricaria
- Species: L. piracicabae

Binomial name
- Loricaria piracicabae Ihering, 1907

Species of catfish

Loricaria piracicabae is a species of freshwater ray-finned fish belonging to the family Loricariidae, the suckermouth armored catfishes, and the subfamily Loricariinae, the mailed catfishes. This catfish is endemic to Brazil where it occurs in the basin of the Tietê River and the upper basin of the Paraná River in the state of Sao Paulo. This species reaches a standard length of 17 cm (6.7 in) and is believed to be a facultative air-breather.
