= Loricaria holmbergi =

Conservation status
- Endangered (IUCN 3.1)

Scientific classification
- Kingdom: Animalia
- Phylum: Chordata
- Class: Actinopterygii
- Order: Siluriformes
- Family: Loricariidae
- Genus: Loricaria
- Species: L. holmbergi

Binomial name
- Loricaria holmbergi Rodriguez & Miquelarena, 2005

Species of catfish

Loricaria holmbergi is a species of freshwater ray-finned fish belonging to the family Loricariidae, the suckermouth armored catfishes, and the subfamily Loricariinae, the mailed catfishes. This catfish is endemic to Jujuy Province in Argentina where it was described from the Aguas Calientes stream, a stream arising from a thermal spring which is a tributary of the Bermejo River, it has since been collected from another Bermejo tributary, the Quebrada Colorada stream. This species reaches a standard length of 11.8 cm (4.6 in). Species in the genus Loricaria are known to be favultative air breathers.

The specific name honours the Argentine biologist and science fiction writer Eduardo Ladislao Holmberg, one of the first naturalists and ichthyologists in Argentina.
