= Neotropical fish =

The freshwater fish of tropical South and Central America, represent one of the most diverse and extreme aquatic ecosystems on Earth, with more than 5,600 species, representing about 10% all living vertebrate species. The exceptional diversity of species, adaptations, and life histories observed in the Neotropical ichthyofauna has been the focus of numerous books and scientific papers, especially the wonderfully complex aquatic ecosystems of the Amazon Basin and adjacent river basins (e.g., Goulding and Smith, 1996; Araujo-Lima and Goulding, 1997; Barthem and Goulding, 1997; Barthem, 2003; Goulding et al., 2003). Many of the advances in Neotropical ichthyology have been summarized in three edited volumes: Malabarba et al. (1998); Reis et al. (2003); Albert and Reis (2011).

== Habitat ==
The Neotropical ichthyofauna extends throughout the continental waters of Central and South America, from south of the Mesa Central in southern Mexico (~ 16° N) to the La Plata estuary in northern Argentina (~ 34° S). The fishes of this region are largely restricted to the humid tropical portions of the Neotropical realm as circumscribed by Sclater (1858) and Wallace (1876), being excluded from the arid Pacific slopes of Peru and northern Chile, and the boreal regions of the Southern Cone in Chile and Argentina (Arratia, 1997; Dyer, 2000). The vast Neotropical ichthyofaunal region extends over more than 17 million square km of moist tropical lowland forests, seasonally flooded wetlands and savannahs, and also several arid peripheral regions (e.g., Northwest Venezuela; Northeast Brazil; Chaco of Paraguay, Argentina and Bolivia).

At the core of this system lies Amazonia, the greatest interconnected freshwater fluvial system on the planet. This system includes the drainages of the Amazon Basin itself, and of two large adjacent regions, the Orinoco Basin and the Guiana Shield. The Amazon River is by any measure the largest in the world, discharging about 16% of the world's flowing freshwater into the Atlantic (Goulding et al., 2003b).
