= Loricaria cuffyi =

Conservation status
- Least Concern (IUCN 3.1)

Scientific classification
- Kingdom: Animalia
- Phylum: Chordata
- Class: Actinopterygii
- Order: Siluriformes
- Family: Loricariidae
- Genus: Loricaria
- Species: L. cuffyi

Binomial name
- Loricaria cuffyi Londoño-Burbano, Urbano-Bonilla & Thomas, 2020

Species of catfish

Loricaria cuffyi is a species of freshwater ray-finned fish belonging to the family Loricariidae, the suckermouth armored catfishes, and the subfamily Loricariinae, the mailed catfishes. It is found in South America, where it occurs in the Essequibo River and Rio Negro basins in Guyana, as well as the Orinoco basin in Venezuela, and it also probably occurs in Brazil, with its type locality being designated as the Ireng River. The species was described in 2020 on the basis of 36 specimens by Alejandro Londoño-Burbano, Alexander Urbano-Bonilla and Matthew R. Thomas.

The specific name honours Cuffy (also spelled Coffy, Kofi, Koffi) the leader of a 1763 slave uprising in the Dutch colony of Berbice against the Dutch colonial regime, this revolt resulted in the slaves' freedom and Cuffy declared himself Governor of Berbice, he is regarded as Guyana’s first national hero.
