= Panaqolus nocturnus =

Conservation status
- Least Concern (IUCN 3.1)

Scientific classification
- Kingdom: Animalia
- Phylum: Chordata
- Class: Actinopterygii
- Order: Siluriformes
- Family: Loricariidae
- Genus: Panaqolus
- Species: P. nocturnus

Binomial name
- Panaqolus nocturnus (Schaefer & D. J. Stewart, 1993)

Species of small catfish

Panaqolus nocturnus, known as the dusky panaque, is a species of freshwater ray-finned fish belonging to the family Loricariidae, the suckermouth armored catfishes, and the subfamily Hypostominae, the suckermouth catfishes. This catfish is found in the Santiago and Pastaza River basins in the upper Napo drainage of Ecuador and Peru and the Marañón River basin of Peru. This species reaches a maximum standard length of 14.4 cm (5.7 in).
