= Loricaria lundbergi =

Conservation status
- Least Concern (IUCN 3.1)

Scientific classification
- Kingdom: Animalia
- Phylum: Chordata
- Class: Actinopterygii
- Order: Siluriformes
- Family: Loricariidae
- Genus: Loricaria
- Species: L. lundbergi

Binomial name
- Loricaria lundbergi Thomas & Rapp Py-Daniel, 2008

Species of catfish

Loricaria lundbergi is a species of freshwater ray-finned fish belonging to the family Loricariidae, the suckermouth armored catfishes, and the subfamily Loricariinae, the mailed catfishes. This catfish is found in South America where it has been recorded from scattered localities in the drainage systems of the Rio Negro and Rio Madeira in Brazil and Venezuela. The catfishes in the genus Loricaria are facultative air breathers. L. lundbergi is found in blackwater rivers where it feeds on insects and detritus. This species reaches a standard length of 13.8 cm (5.4 in). The specific name honours the American ichthyologist John G. Lundberg of the Academy of Natural Sciences of Philadelphia, for his leadership of the Calhamazon Project and his many other important contributions to the knowledge of ichthyology in the Neotropics.
