= Loricaria nickeriensis =

Conservation status
- Near Threatened (IUCN 3.1)

Scientific classification
- Kingdom: Animalia
- Phylum: Chordata
- Class: Actinopterygii
- Order: Siluriformes
- Family: Loricariidae
- Genus: Loricaria
- Species: L. nickeriensis

Binomial name
- Loricaria nickeriensis Isbrücker, 1979

Species of catfish

Loricaria nickeriensis is a species of freshwater ray-finned fish belonging to the family Loricariidae, the suckermouth armored catfishes, and the subfamily Loricariinae, the mailed catfishes. This catfish is found in South America, where it occurs in the basins of the Nickerie River and the Maroni in French Guiana and Suriname. The species reaches a standard length of 12 cm (4.7 in) and is believed to be a facultative air-breather.
