= Panaqolus claustellifer =

Conservation status
- Least Concern (IUCN 3.1)

Scientific classification
- Kingdom: Animalia
- Phylum: Chordata
- Class: Actinopterygii
- Order: Siluriformes
- Family: Loricariidae
- Genus: Panaqolus
- Species: P. claustellifer

Binomial name
- Panaqolus claustellifer Tan, Souza & Armbruster, 2016

Species of catfish

Panaqolus claustellifer is a species of freshwater ray-finned fish belonging to the family Loricariidae, the suckermouth armored catfishes, and the subfamily Hypostominae, the suckermouth catfishes. This catfish is found in the Amazon basin, occurring in the Takutu River in Guyana and the upper Branco River in Brazil. This species reaches a standard length of6.2 cm (2.4 in). While not described until 2016, it was known to aquarists before its formal description. In the aquarium trade, it is typically referred to either as the blood-red tiger pleco or by one of its two associated L-numbers, which are L-306 and LDA-064. The specific name, claustellifer, means "keyhole bearer" and is a reference to keyhole shape of the brown area on the snout, bordered by pale lines.
