= Panaqolus tankei =

Scientific classification
- Kingdom: Animalia
- Phylum: Chordata
- Class: Actinopterygii
- Order: Siluriformes
- Family: Loricariidae
- Genus: Panaqolus
- Species: P. tankei

Binomial name
- Panaqolus tankei Cramer & L. M. de Sousa, 2016

Species of catfish

Panaqolus tankei is a species of freshwater ray-finned fish belonging to the family Loricariidae, the suckermouth armored catfishes, and the subfamily Hypostominae, the suckermouth catfishes. This catfish is found in the Xingu River in Brazil. This species reaches a standard length of 8.3 cm (3.3 in). P. tankei was described in 2016 by Christian A. Cramer and Leandro Melo de Sousa primarily based on differences between this species and other members of the genus Panaqolus in coloration and patterning. The specific name, tankei, honours the German aquarist Andreas Tanke, who worked on the catfishes in the genus Panaqolus and was likley the first to breed these fishes in captivity, as well as his work to improve relations between aquarists and scientists.

It appears in the aquarium trade, where it is one of several species referred to as a tiger pleco due to its striped appearance, although it may also be referred to specifically by its L-number, which is L-398.
