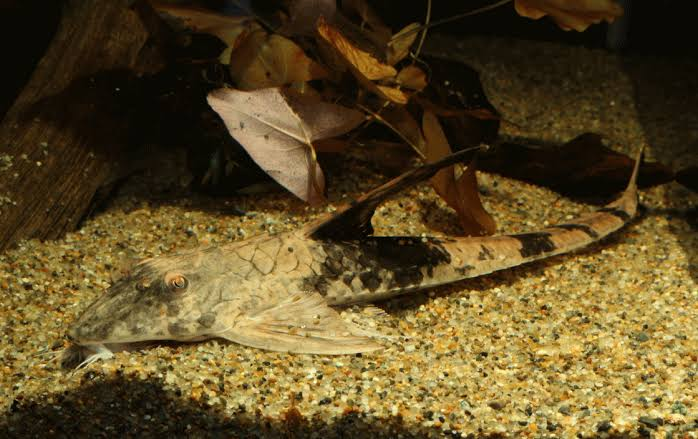
- Loricaria simillima

Scientific classification
- Kingdom: Animalia
- Phylum: Chordata
- Class: Actinopterygii
- Division: Teleostei
- Order: Siluriformes
- Family: Loricariidae
- Subfamily: Loricariinae
- Genus: Loricaria; Linnaeus, 1758

Type species
- Loricaria cataphracta Linnaeus, 1758

Synonyms
- Fusiloricaria Fowler, 1940

= Loricaria =

Genus of fishes

Loricaria is a genus of freshwater ray-finned fishes belonging to the family Loricariidae, the suckermouth armored catfishes, and the subfamily Loricariinae, the mailed catfishes. The catfishes in this genus are found in South America.

== Taxonomy ==
Loricaria was the first genus of the family Loricariidae described. Thus, it is the nominal genus of the family Loricariidae. Phylogenetic relationships within Loricaria and among other members of Loricariini remain uncertain. Its external morphology shows few shared derived characters, making comparison with other genera difficult. Loricaria has been hypothesized to occupy a basal position among members of the subtribe Loricariina, with the other genera possessing derived characters. Based on the characteristics of its mouth, Loricaria appears to maintain a close relationship with representatives of the Pseudohemiodon group. Proloricaria has been considered a synonym of Loricaria.

== Species ==
Loricaria contains the following valid, recognised species;

- Loricaria apeltogaster Boulenger, 1895
- Loricaria birindellii Thomas & Sabaj Pérez, 2010
- Loricaria cataphracta Linnaeus, 1758
- Loricaria clavipinna Fowler, 1940
- Loricaria coximensis Rodriguez, Cavallaro & Thomas, 2012
- Loricaria cuffyi Londoño-Burbano, Urbano-Bonilla & Thomas, 2020
- Loricaria holmbergi Rodriguez & Miquelarena, 2005
- Loricaria lata C. H. Eigenmann & R. S. Eigenmann, 1889
- Loricaria luciae Thomas, Rodriguez, Carvallaro, Froehlich & R. M. C. Castro, 2013
- Loricaria lundbergi Thomas & Rapp Py-Daniel, 2008
- Loricaria nickeriensis Isbrücker, 1979
- Loricaria nimairaco Londoño-Burbano, Urbano-Bonilla, Thomas & Britto, 2023
- Loricaria parnahybae Steindachner, 1907
- Loricaria piracicabae Ihering, 1907
- Loricaria pumila Thomas & Rapp Py-Daniel, 2008
- Loricaria simillima Regan, 1904
- Loricaria spinulifera Thomas & Rapp Py-Daniel, 2008
- Loricaria thomasi Provenzano & Sabaj, 2024
- Loricaria tucumanensis Isbrücker, 1979
- Loricaria turi Saraiva, Abreu, Ottoni & Piorski, 2021

== Distribution and habitat ==
This genus is distributed east of the Andes in nearly the entire tropical and subtropical parts of South America. Species occur in a variety of habitats from the main flow of rivers on sandy and rocky bottoms to flooded areas and lakes over muddy and sandy bottoms.

== Description ==
Loricaria species are recognized by the presence of elongate, slender filaments on the lips and a low number of bicuspid premaxillary teeth (usually three to four per side) that are about twice the length of the dentary teeth.

Sexual dimorphism includes hypertrophied development of the pectoral fin spines, blunt odontodes on the pelvic and anal fin spines, and tooth crowns becoming shortened and rounded in mature males.

For the four species characterized, karyotypic diversity ranges from 2n = 62 to 2n = 68.

== Ecology ==
The site of egg deposition varies between different members of the genus. In some species, eggs are carried on the enlarged lower lip of the male. L. piracicabae has its egg adherent to its ventral surface. Males are abdomino-lip brooders.
