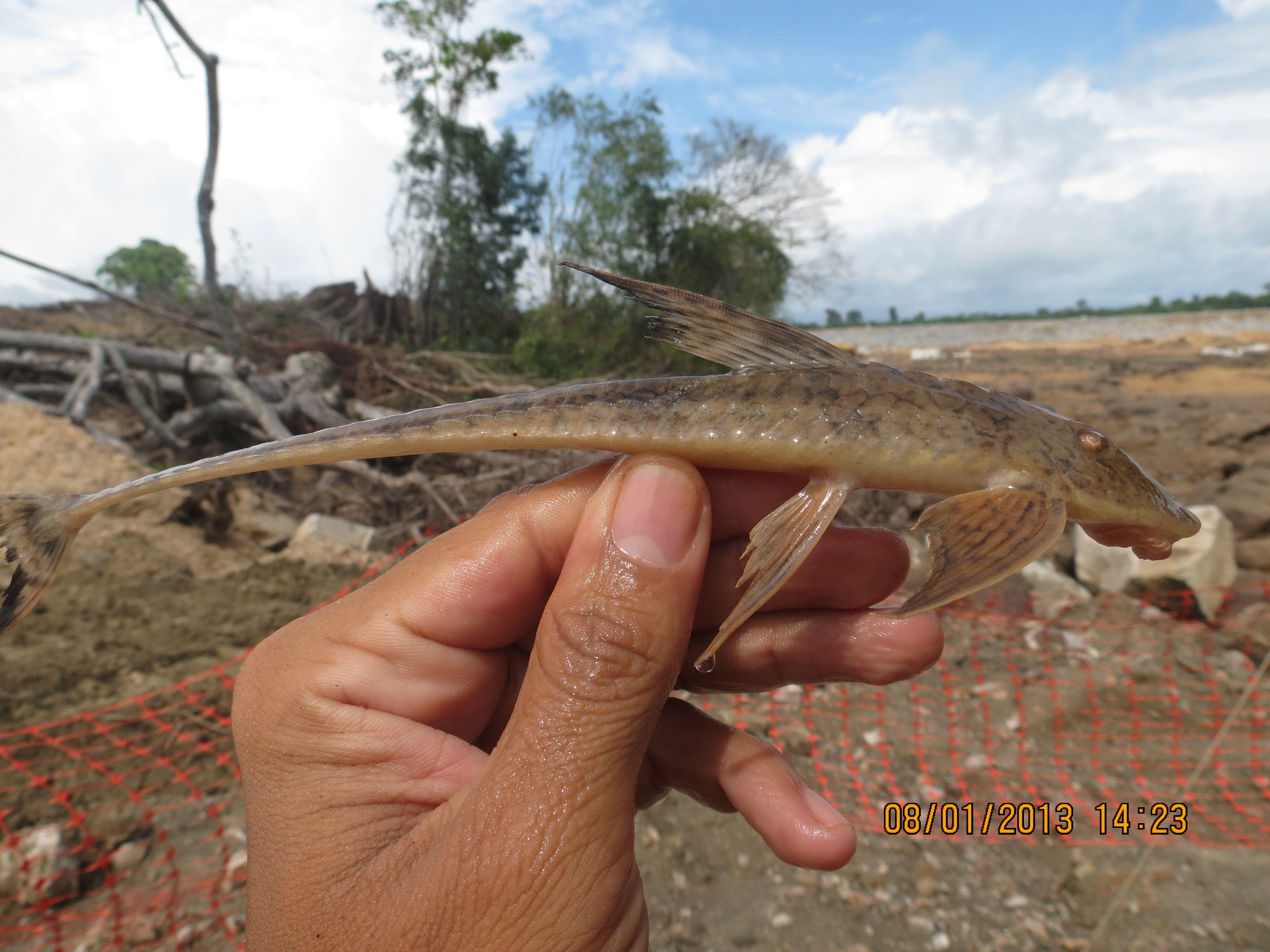

Conservation status
- Least Concern (IUCN 3.1)

Scientific classification
- Kingdom: Animalia
- Phylum: Chordata
- Class: Actinopterygii
- Order: Siluriformes
- Family: Loricariidae
- Genus: Loricaria
- Species: L. birindellii

Binomial name
- Loricaria birindellii Thomas & Sabaj Pérez, 2010

= Loricaria birindellii =

Species of catfish

Loricaria birindellii is a species of freshwater ray-finned fish belonging to the family Loricariidae, the suckermouth armored catfishes, and the subfamily Loricariinae, the mailed catfishes. This catfish is endemic to Brazil where it is found in the basin of the Xingu River in Pará L. birindellii was first formally described in 2010 by Matthew R. Thomas and Mark Henry Sabaj Pérez with its type locality given as the Rio Curuá in the Iriri-Xingu drainage, near town of Castelo dos Sonhos at 8°19'07"S, 55°05'23"W, in Altamira Municipality, Pará. This species has a maximum total length of 36.5 cm (14.4 in) and a maximum weight of 118.2 g (4.17 oz).

The specific name honours the Brazilian ichthyologist José Luís O. Birindelli of the University of São Paulo who led the 2007 expedition on which the holotype of L. birindellii, among others, was collected.
