= Loricaria lata =

Conservation status
- Data Deficient (IUCN 3.1)

Scientific classification
- Kingdom: Animalia
- Phylum: Chordata
- Class: Actinopterygii
- Order: Siluriformes
- Family: Loricariidae
- Genus: Loricaria
- Species: L. lata

Binomial name
- Loricaria lata C. H. Eigenmann & R. S. Eigenmann, 1889

Species of catfish

Loricaria lata is a species of freshwater ray-finned fish belonging to the family Loricariidae, the suckermouth armored catfishes, and the subfamily Loricariinae, the mailed catfishes. This catfish is endemic to Brazil, it was first formally described in 1889 by Carl H. Eigenmann and Rosa Smith Eigenmann with its type locality being the Araguaia River in Goiás but in the late 20th Century this species was collected from a number of locations in the basin of the Tocantins River. L. lata attains a maximum published standard length of 27 cm (11 in). Species in the genus Loricaria are known to be favultative air breathers.
