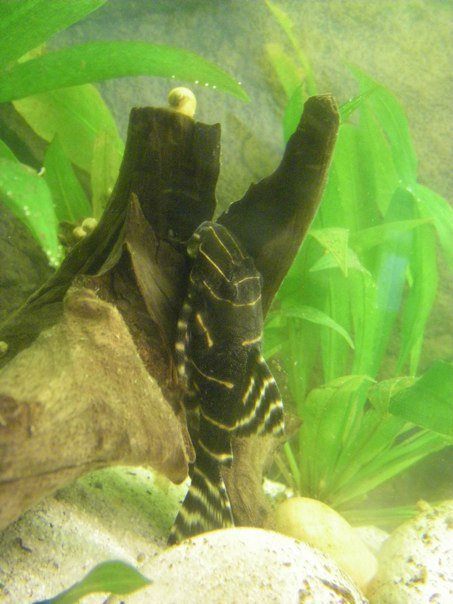
- Panaqolus albivermis, sometimes known as L-204

Scientific classification
- Kingdom: Animalia
- Phylum: Chordata
- Class: Actinopterygii
- Order: Siluriformes
- Family: Loricariidae
- Subfamily: Hypostominae
- Genus: Panaqolus; Isbrücker & Schraml, 2001

Type species
- Panaque gnomus Schaefer & D. J. Stewart, 1993

Synonyms
- Panafilus Lujan, Cramer, Covain, Fisch-Muller & López-Fernández, 2017; Panaqoco Lujan, Cramer, Covain, Fisch-Muller & López-Fernández, 2017

= Panaqolus =

Genus of fishes

Panaqolus is a genus of freshwater ray-finned fishes belonging to the family Loricariidae, the suckermouth armoured catfishes, and the subfamily Hypostominae, the suckermouth catfishes. The catfishes in this genus are found in South America.

== Taxonomy ==
Panoqolus was first formally proposed as a genus in 2001 by Isaäc J. H. Isbrücker and Erwin Schraml with Panaque gnomus designated as its type species. P. gnomus has been described in 1993 from Ecuador by Scott Allen Schaefer and Donald J. Stewart. Its members were formerly thought to belong to a clade of small-sized species in the genus Panaque, until this genus was separated from Panaque in 2001. At times it has been considered a subgenus of Panaque, and the validity of the genus has been disputed by various authors and sources. Pseudoqolus koko was formerly considered to be a member of this genus, although it was reclassified as a member of the currently monotypic genus Pseudoqolus by Nathan K. Lujan, Christian A. Cramer, Raphael Covain, Sonia Fisch-Muller, and Hernán López-Fernández following a 2017 molecular phylogenetic analysis. Some authorities regard this genus as being within the tribe Ancistrini of the subfamily Hypostominae, but Eschmeyer's Catalog of Fishes does not recognise tribes within the subfamily Hypostominae.

== Etymology ==
Panaqolus is a diminutive of Panaque, this refers to the smaller size of the fishes in this genus in comparison to the species in Panaque.

== Species ==
Panaqolus contains the following valid species:

- Panaqolus albivermis Lujan, Steele & Velasquez, 2013
- Panaqolus albomaculatus (Kanazawa, 1958)
- Panaqolus changae (Chockley & Armbruster, 2002)
- Panaqolus claustellifer Tan, de Souza & Armbruster, 2016
- Panaqolus dentex (Günther, 1868)
- Panaqolus gnomus (Schaefer & D. J. Stewart, 1993)
- Panaqolus maccus (Schaefer & D. J. Stewart, 1993)
- Panaqolus nix Cramer & Rapp Py-Daniel, 2015
- Panaqolus nocturnus (Schaefer & D. J. Stewart, 1993)
- Panaqolus orcesi Provenzano, Barriga-Salazar & D. J. Stewart, 2024
- Panaqolus pantostiktos Provenzano, Barriga-Salazar & D. J. Stewart, 2024
- Panaqolus purusiensis (LaMonte, 1935)
- Panaqolus tankei Cramer & Sousa, 2016
