= Loricaria parnahybae =

Conservation status
- Least Concern (IUCN 3.1)

Scientific classification
- Kingdom: Animalia
- Phylum: Chordata
- Class: Actinopterygii
- Order: Siluriformes
- Family: Loricariidae
- Genus: Loricaria
- Species: L. parnahybae

Binomial name
- Loricaria parnahybae Steindachner, 1907

Synonyms
- Loricaria piauhiae Fowler, 1941

Species of catfish

Loricaria parnahybae is a species of freshwater ray-finned fish belonging to the family Loricariidae, the suckermouth armored catfishes, and the subfamily Loricariinae, the mailed catfishes. This catfish is endemic to the drainage system of the Parnaiba River in the states of Ceará, Maranhão and Piauí in Brazil. It is typically found in environments characterized by a sandy substrate. This species reaches a standard length of 16 cm (6.3 in) and is believed to be a facultative air-breather.

Loricaria parnahybae appears in the aquarium trade, where it is often referred to as the Parnahyba whiptail.
