= Panaqolus albomaculatus =

Conservation status
- Least Concern (IUCN 3.1)

Scientific classification
- Kingdom: Animalia
- Phylum: Chordata
- Class: Actinopterygii
- Order: Siluriformes
- Family: Loricariidae
- Genus: Panaqolus
- Species: P. albomaculatus

Binomial name
- Panaqolus albomaculatus (Kanazawa, 1958)

Synonyms
- Panaque albomaculatus Kanazawa, 1958

Species of catfish

Panaqolus albomaculatus is a species of freshwater ray-finned fish belonging to the family Loricariidae, the suckermouth armored catfishes, and the subfamily Hypostominae, the suckermouth catfishes. This catfish is found in Ecuador and Peru, where it occurs in the headwaters of the Napo River, the Marañón River, and the Ucayali River. This species reaches a standard length 12.4 cm (4.9 in). It is sometimes seen in the aquarium trade, where it is typically referred to either as the mustard-spot pleco, the orange-spot pleco, or by its L-number, which is LDA-031 (not to be confused with L-031, which refers to the species Parancistrus nudiventris).
