= Loricaria coximensis =

Conservation status
- Critically Endangered (IUCN 3.1)

Scientific classification
- Kingdom: Animalia
- Phylum: Chordata
- Class: Actinopterygii
- Order: Siluriformes
- Family: Loricariidae
- Genus: Loricaria
- Species: L. coximensis

Binomial name
- Loricaria coximensis Rodriguez, Cavallaro & Thomas, 2012

Species of catfish

Loricaria coximensis is a species of freshwater ray-finned fish belonging to the family Loricariidae, the suckermouth armored catfishes, and the subfamily Loricariinae, the mailed catfishes. This catfish is endemic to Brazil, where it occurs in the basin of the Coxim River, for which it is named, near the municipality of São Gabriel do Oeste in the state of Mato Grosso do Sul. The gut contents of one individual examined contained only seeds, indicating that the species may be granivorous. The species reaches 9.4 cm (3.7 inches) in standard length and is believed to be a facultative air-breather.
