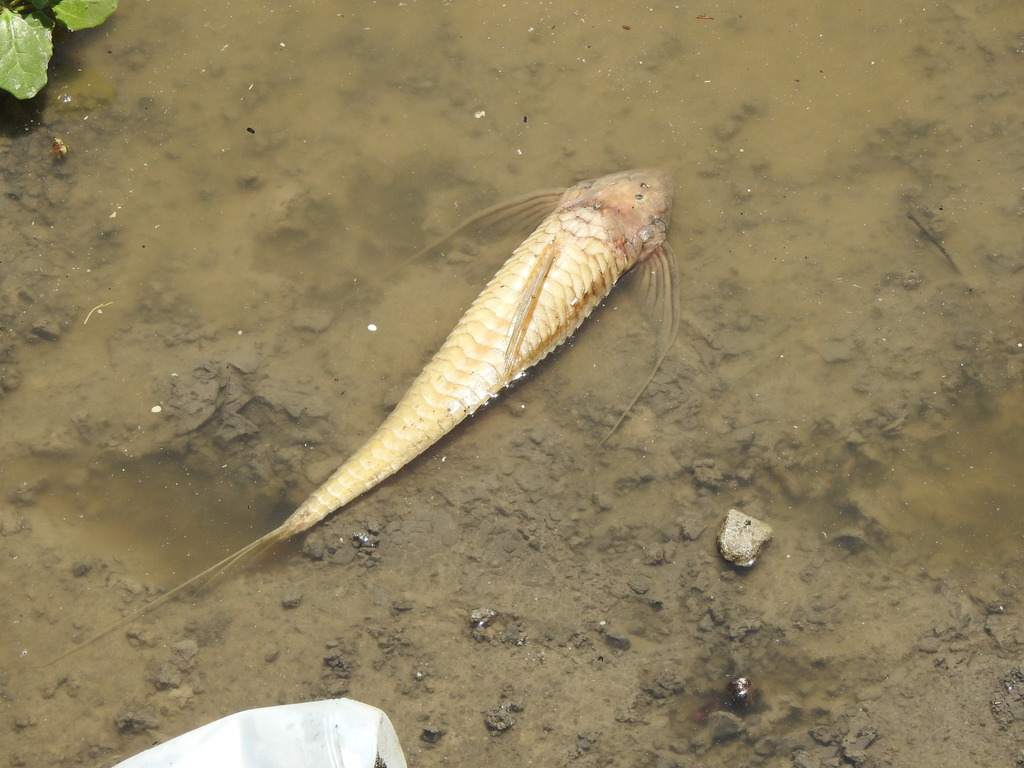

Conservation status
- Least Concern (IUCN 3.1)

Scientific classification
- Kingdom: Animalia
- Phylum: Chordata
- Class: Actinopterygii
- Order: Siluriformes
- Family: Loricariidae
- Genus: Loricaria
- Species: L. apeltogaster

Binomial name
- Loricaria apeltogaster Boulenger, 1895

= Loricaria apeltogaster =

Species of catfish

Loricaria apeltogaster, the Paraguay whiptail catfish, is a species of freshwater ray-finned fish belonging to the family Loricariidae, the suckermouth armored catfishes, and the subfamily Loricariinae, the mailed catfishes. This catfish is found in South America, where it occurs in the drainage basins of the Paraguay River, the Paraná River, and the Uruguay River in Argentina, Brazil, Paraguay and Uruguay. The species reaches a standard length of 32.4 cm (12.8 in) and is believed to be a facultative air-breather.
