= Loricaria tucumanensis =

Conservation status
- Least Concern (IUCN 3.1)

Scientific classification
- Kingdom: Animalia
- Phylum: Chordata
- Class: Actinopterygii
- Order: Siluriformes
- Family: Loricariidae
- Genus: Loricaria
- Species: L. tucumanensis

Binomial name
- Loricaria tucumanensis Isbrücker, 1979

Species of catfish

Loricaria tucumanensis is a species of freshwater ray-finned fish belonging to the family Loricariidae, the suckermouth armored catfishes, and the subfamily Loricariinae, the mailed catfishes. This catfish endemic to Argentina where it occurs in the northwestern provinces of Entre Ríos, Jujuy, Salta and Tucumán in the basins of the Salta and Paraná rivers, This species reaches a standard length of 12.1 cm (4.8 in) and is believed to be a facultative air-breather.
