= Ucayali Peneplain =

The Ucayali Peneplain is a large near-flat erosion surface, a peneplain, located in the Amazon basin. The Ucayali Peneplain is largely buried by sediments forming an unconformity. Its origin has been dated to the Miocene epoch. The Peneplain was first described in 1948 in the Contamana region of Peru.
