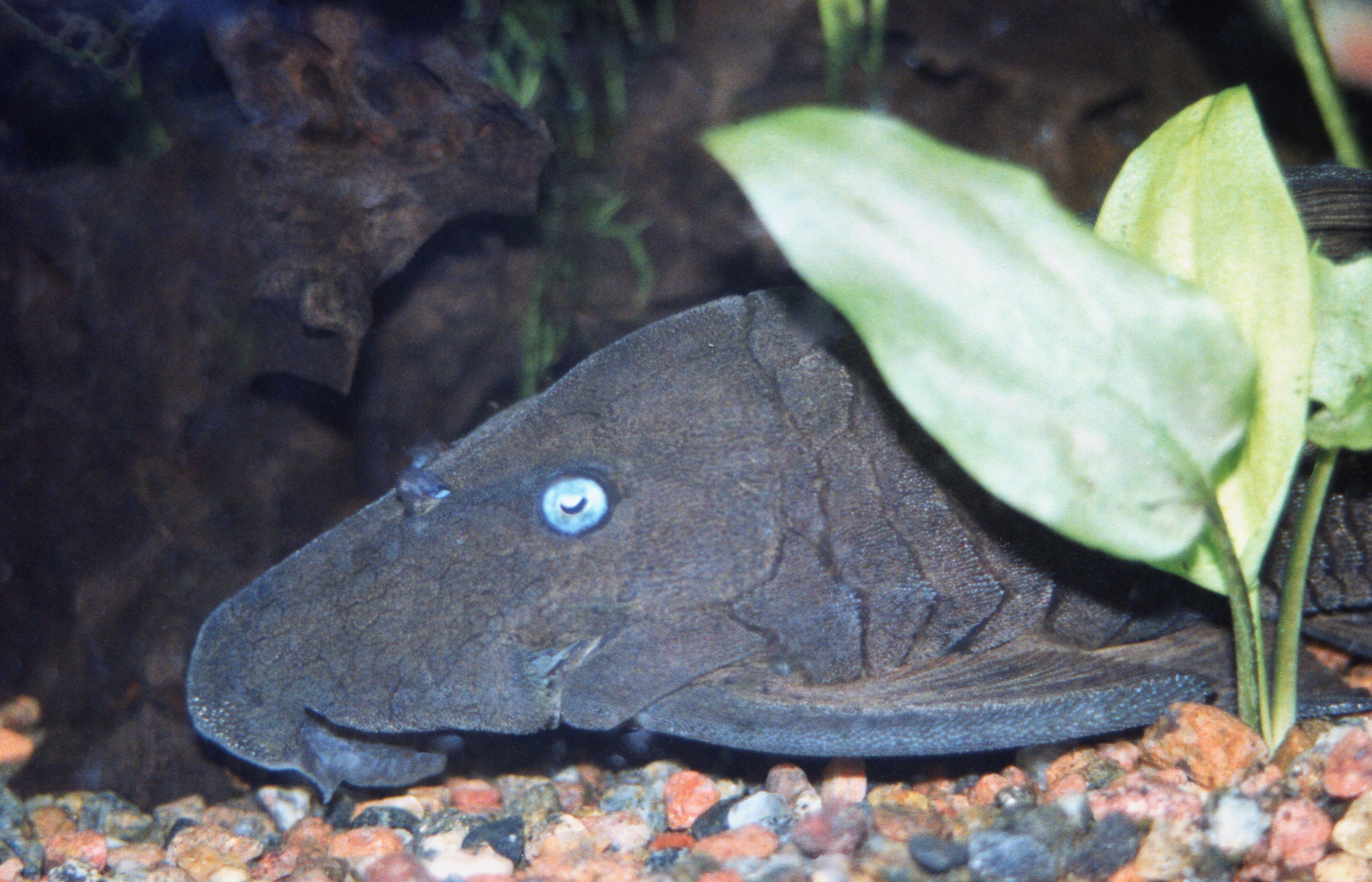

Conservation status
- Near Threatened (IUCN 3.1)

Scientific classification
- Kingdom: Animalia
- Phylum: Chordata
- Class: Actinopterygii
- Order: Siluriformes
- Family: Loricariidae
- Genus: Panaque
- Species: P. cochliodon

Binomial name
- Panaque cochliodon (Steindachner, 1879)

Synonyms
- Chaetostomus cochliodon Steindachner, 1879; Chaetostomus cochliodon gibbosus Steindachner, 1880

= Panaque cochliodon =

Species of fish

Panaque cochliodon, the blue eyed royal pleco, blue eyed pleco or blue-eyed panaque is a herbivorous freshwater ray-finned fish belonging to the family Loricariidae, the suckermouth armoured catfishes, and the subfamily Hypostominae, the suckermouth catfishes. This catfish is endemic to Colombia where it occurs in the Cauca and Magdalena River basins. It is distinguished from many loricariids by being dark grey to black and having bright, turquoise-coloured eyes. Like other species of the genus Panaque, P. cochliodon feeds primarily on submerged wood. Blue-eyed plecs grow to about 30 cm (12 in) in length and, like other Panaque species, they are clumsy swimmers adapted to staying close the substrate, using their sucker-like mouths to hold on to submerged rocks and wood.

== Blue-eye plecs as aquarium fish ==
Panaque cochliodon have been kept as aquarium fish, and were fairly popular during the 1980s and early 1990s. However, they are now very rarely traded because wild fish can only be obtained from rivers in Colombia considered to be outside the control of the Colombian government.
