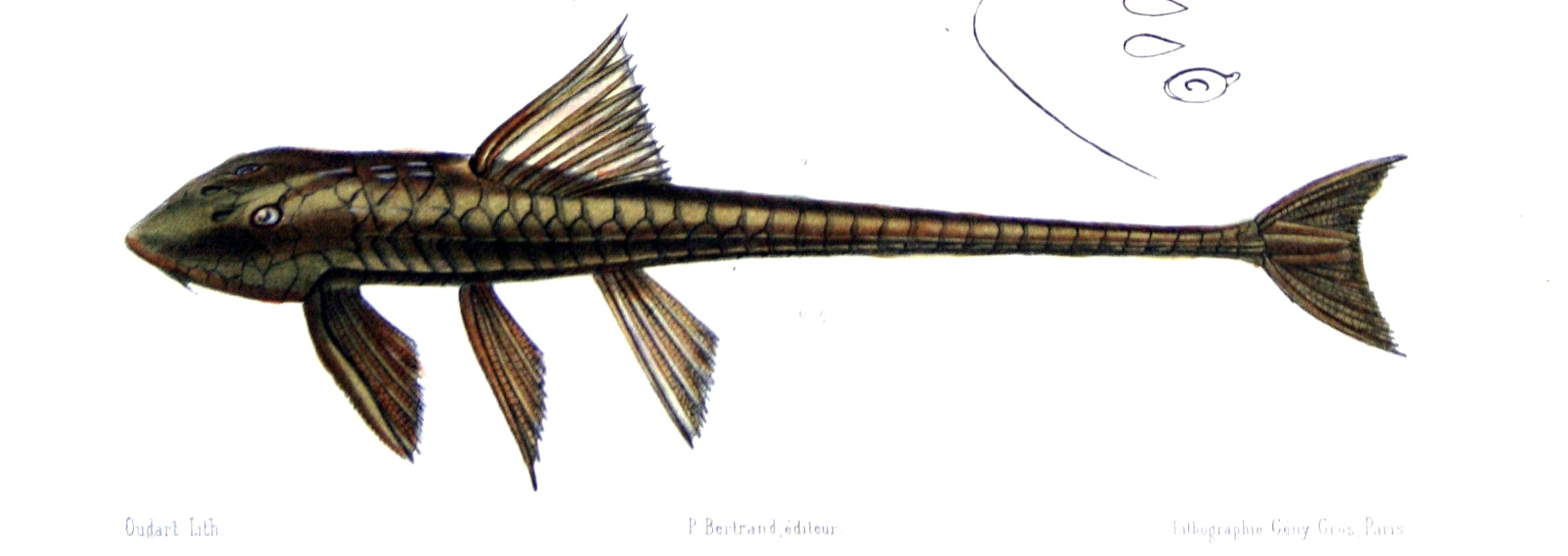

Conservation status
- Least Concern (IUCN 3.1)

Scientific classification
- Kingdom: Animalia
- Phylum: Chordata
- Class: Actinopterygii
- Division: Teleostei
- Order: Siluriformes
- Family: Loricariidae
- Genus: Loricaria
- Species: L. cataphracta

Binomial name
- Loricaria cataphracta Linnaeus, 1758

Synonyms
- Loricaria cirrhosa Bloch & Schneider, 1801; Loricaria setifera Lacépède, 1803; Loricaria carinata Castelnau, 1855; Plecostomus flagellaris Gronow, 1854; Loricaria dura Bleeker, 1862

= Loricaria cataphracta =

Species of fish

Loricaria cataphracta, the chocolate loricariid or goatee whiptail catfish, is a species of freshwater ray-finned fish belonging to the family Loricariidae, the suckermouth armored catfishes, and the subfamily Loricariinae, the mailed catfishes. This catfish is found in South America, where it occurs in the Amazon River basin, the Orinoco and coastal rivers in the Guianas, this species has been recorded in Argentina, Bolivia, Brazil, Colombia, Ecuador, French Guiana, Guyana, Paraguay, Peru, Suriname and Venezuela, This species is a facultative air breather, the parents carry the eggs stuck to the ventral surfaces of their bodies. This fish reaches a maximum standard length of 29.5 cm (11.6 in). L. cataphracta is an omnivore that occurs in rivers.

Loricaria cataphracta is the type species of the genus Loricaria, it was first formally described by Linnaeus in the 10th edition of Systema Naturae published in 1758 with its type locality given as the mouth of the Marowijne River in Suriname. As it was the only species Linnaeus described in Loricaria it is its type species by monotypy.
