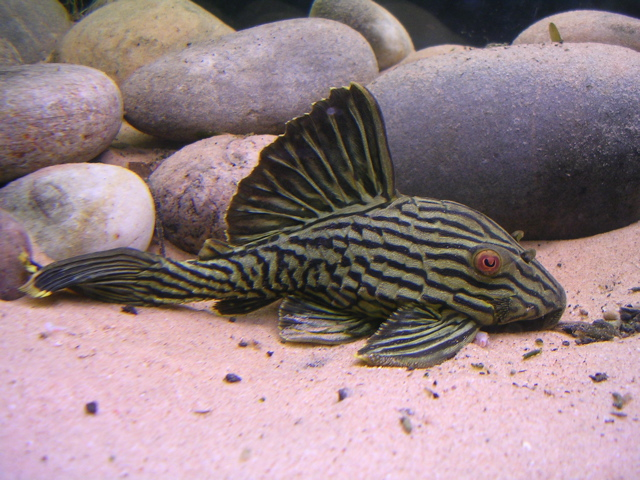
- Panaque nigrolineatus in an aquarium

Scientific classification
- Kingdom: Animalia
- Phylum: Chordata
- Class: Actinopterygii
- Division: Teleostei
- Order: Siluriformes
- Family: Loricariidae
- Subfamily: Hypostominae
- Genus: Panaque; C. H. Eigenmann & R. S. Eigenmann, 1889

Type species
- Chaetostomus nigrolineatus W. K. H. Peters, 1877

= Panaque =

Genus of fishes

Panaque is a genus of freshwater ray-finned fishes belonging to the family Loricariidae, the suckermouth armoured catfishes, and the subfamily Hypostominae, the suckermouth catfishes. The catfishes in this genus are notable for being among the very few vertebrates that feed extensively on wood. In addition, algae and aufwuchs are an important part of the diet, and they use their rasping teeth to scrape this from rocks. These fish are also popular aquarium fish, where the sound of scraping as these fish forage for food is easily audible.

== Taxonomy ==
Panaque was first formally proposed as a genus in 1889 by the German-born American ichthyologist Carl H. Eigenmann and his wife Rosa Smith Eigenmann with Chaetostomus nigrolineatus designated as its type species. C. nigrolineatus was first formally described in 1877 by Wilhelm Peters with its type locality given as the Guárico River at Calabozo in the Apure River drainage, Guárico State, Venezuela. Some authorities regard this genus as being within the tribe Ancistrini of the subfamily Hypostominae, but Eschmeyer's Catalog of Fishes does not recognise tribes within the subfamily Hypostominae.

Scobinancistrus and Panaqolus are sometimes considered to be subgenera of this genus.

=== Species ===
Panaque contains the following valid species:

- Panaque armbrusteri Lujan, Hidalgo & D. J. Stewart, 2010
- Panaque bathyphilus Lujan & Chamon, 2008
- Panaque cochliodon Steindachner, 1879
- Panaque nigrolineatus W. K. H. Peters, 1877 (Royal panaque)
- Panaque schaeferi Lujan, Hidalgo & D. J. Stewart, 2010
- Panaque suttonorum L. P. Schultz, 1944 (Blue-eye panaque)
- Panaque titan Lujan, Hidalgo & D. J. Stewart, 2010

== Etymology ==
Panaque is the local name for the type species of this genus, P. nigrolineatus, in Venezuela.

== Distribution and habitat ==
Panaque are found in the Magdalena River, Orinoco River, Amazon River, Essequibo River, and Lake Maracaibo drainages. All Panaque come from tropical South American and inhabit fast-flowing streams and rivers. They are weak swimmers but like other armoured catfish possess a strong sucker-like mouth with which they can hold on to submerged rocks and wood.

== Physical characteristics ==
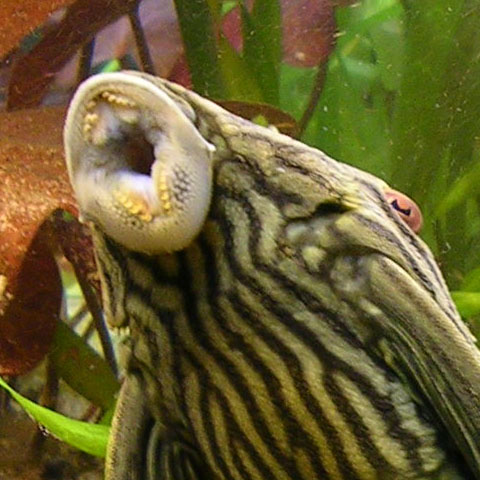
Mouth and teeth of Panaque nigrolineatus

Panaque may be distinguished from other related genera by their teeth, which are spoon-shaped, being clearly broader at their tips than at their bases. Other suckermouth catfishes have teeth that are similarly wide from their bases to their tips. They also lack a buccal papilla, a "flap of skin" on the inside of the mouth.

Unlike predatory catfish, these omnivorous catfish have very short barbels. These barbels can be seen in the photograph of mouth of a Panaque shown here; they are the short pointed structures on either side of a suckermouth. This sucker-like mouth allows them to attach to rocks and remain stationary with very little expenditure of energy.

=== Xylophagy (wood consumption and digestion) ===
Along with the species of the Hypostomus cochliodon group (formerly the genus Cochliodon), it has been argued that Panaque are the only fish that can eat and digest wood. Possible adaptations to consuming wood include spoon-shaped, scraper-like teeth and highly angled jaws to chisel wood. Researchers have also identified symbiotic gut bacteria that may allow the fish to digest the wood they consume. However, others have argued that Panaque do not in fact digest wood, and in fact take up very little energy from the wood they consume and actually lose weight when fed just wood. Furthermore, their digestive tracts are no different from those of related catfish and they do not hold wood particles in the gut longer than other catfish, suggesting Panaque are not physically adapted to eating wood, and are in fact detritivores much like other Loricariidae. In September 2010 scientists from the US National Science Foundation claimed to have discovered a new species of wood-eating catfish in the Alto Purús National Park, Peru.

== In the aquarium ==
Several species of Panaque have become popular aquarium fish. The brightly coloured Panaque nigrolineatus is particularly popular and is known as the "royal panaque" or "royal pleco", monikers which reflect its comparative costliness and beauty over the common pleco. Royal plecos have a greyish-green base color against which thick, dark bluish-black stripes are set; their fins are edged with gold or cream, and their eyes are red. In captivity, royal plecos typically grow to around 30 centimeters in length.

A second species, Panaque cochliodon, is familiar to many aquarists as the "blue-eyed pleco". Though the blue-eyed pleco was widely traded in the late 1980s and early 1990s, it is now only rarely exported from its native Colombia. It is also associated with the binomina Panaque suttonorum and P. suttoni, though Panaque suttonorum is a different fish which only comes from Venezuela. Blue-eyed plecos reach a similar size to royal plecos, but because many specimens are infected with a bacterium closely related to Rickettsia, mortality immediately after import can be high. However, once they have settled in and begun feeding, they are no more difficult to keep than royal plecos.

All Panaque catfish require much the same care in captivity. Panaque mainly demand a mixed diet including green algae, fresh vegetables such as carrots, courgettes, and spinach, but because they are argued to be xylophagous, many aquarists provide driftwood for them to graze upon, as well. The meaty foods enjoyed by other plecos are not required. Because they are relatively big for aquarium fish and produce an unusually large amount of waste, a high-capacity tank and filter are essential. Royal panaques tolerate a wider range of water chemistry than others—they prefer somewhat soft, slightly acid water but they will tolerate hard, alkaline water.

In terms of behavior, Panaque are peaceful and nocturnal bottom-dwellers which make good residents in community tanks. Like most of the other armored catfish, they are territorial, and groups should only be kept in very large tanks.

== See also ==
- List of freshwater aquarium fish species
