= Loricaria spinulifera =

Conservation status
- Least Concern (IUCN 3.1)

Scientific classification
- Kingdom: Animalia
- Phylum: Chordata
- Class: Actinopterygii
- Order: Siluriformes
- Family: Loricariidae
- Genus: Loricaria
- Species: L. spinulifera

Binomial name
- Loricaria spinulifera Thomas & Rapp Py-Daniel, 2008

Species of catfish

Loricaria spinulifera is a species of freshwater ray-finned fish belonging to the family Loricariidae, the suckermouth armored catfishes, and the subfamily Loricariinae, the mailed catfishes. This catfish is endemic to Brazil where it occurs in the occurs in the Rio Negro, the lower Rio Branco River and the Rio Jauaperi in the states of Amazonas and Roraima. It is typically seen in deep channels of blackwater rivers, where it is usually found at depths of 1.5 to 28 m (4 ft 11 in to 91 ft 10 in) and distances of 10 to 750 m (33 to 2,461 ft) from the shoreline. The environments in which the species occurs are characterized by substrates composed of sand, mud, and organic debris. Individuals of the species collected from deeper water tend to have smaller eyes and less prominent patterning than those collected from shallower areas. An analysis of the stomach contents of a single individual found evidence of feeding on aquatic insect larvae, as well as sand and detritus. The species reaches 13.8 cm (5.4 in) in standard length and is believed to be a facultative air-breather. Its specific name, spinulifera, is derived from Latin and means "spine-bearing", referring to the conspicuous thornlike odontodes found on its head.
