= Panaqolus nix =

Scientific classification
- Kingdom: Animalia
- Phylum: Chordata
- Class: Actinopterygii
- Order: Siluriformes
- Family: Loricariidae
- Genus: Panaqolus
- Species: P. nix

Binomial name
- Panaqolus nix Cramer & Rapp Py-Daniel, 2015

Species of catfish native to South America

Panaqolus nix is a species of freshwater ray-finned fish belonging to the family Loricariidae, the suckermouth armored catfishes, and the subfamily Hypostominae, the suckermouth catfishes. This catfish occurs in the Madeira River and the Mamoré River in Brazil, as well as the Madre de Dios River drainage basin in Peru. It is reported to have been caught in cofferdams at hydroelectric power plant construction sites in the Madeira River, with most specimens being collected at depths of 3.1 to 11 m (10 to 36 ft) in environments with a strong current. This species reachesa standard length 11.2 cm (4.4 in) and is known to be quite variable in color. Its specific epithet, nix, derives from the Latin word for "snow", referring both to the species' characteristic white spots that are said to resemble snowflakes and the tendency of some individuals to be entirely pale, as if they are covered in snow.
