= Loricaria pumila =

Conservation status
- Least Concern (IUCN 3.1)

Scientific classification
- Kingdom: Animalia
- Phylum: Chordata
- Class: Actinopterygii
- Order: Siluriformes
- Family: Loricariidae
- Genus: Loricaria
- Species: L. pumila

Binomial name
- Loricaria pumila Thomas & Rapp Py-Daniel, 2008

Species of catfish

Loricaria pumila is a species of freshwater ray-finned fish belonging to the family Loricariidae, the suckermouth armored catfishes, and the subfamily Loricariinae, the mailed catfishes. This catfish is endemic to the Brazilian state of Pará where it has been recorded from the lower Amazon River, near the mouth of the Tapajós River, the Pará River, and the lower Tocantins River. It is reportedly typically found at depths between 3 and 29 m (10 and 95 ft) and distances of 15 to 1,500 m (49 to 4,921 ft) from the shoreline, in environments characterized by a substrate of silt and organic detritus. An analysis of the stomach contents of a single individual found evidence of feeding on insects and aquatic insect larvae, as well as sand and detritus. This species reaches a standard length of 8.1 cm (3.2 in) and is believed to be a facultative air-breather. The specific name, pumila, is Latin and means "dwarfish", an allusion to teh small adult size of this fish.
