= List of invasive species in India =

Invasive alien species represent a grave threat to India's globally significant biodiversity, agricultural productivity, and public health. These are non-native organisms—encompassing plants, animals, and microbes—that, once introduced, establish themselves and proliferate rapidly, causing devastating ecological and economic consequences. These species disrupt native plant communities, alter ecological processes, and affect sectors such as agriculture, forestry, and protected area management. An assessment report, compiled by the National Biodiversity Authority for the Ministry of Environment, Forests and Climate Change, Government of India, is crucial for framing the national management strategies, identifying species based on their known impacts (such as biodiversity loss, economic loss, and health hazards), and tracking their continued range extension across various Indian ecosystems. With globalization, climate change, and anthropogenic disturbances, the risk and spread of invasive plant species have accelerated, making monitoring and management critical for conservation.

Diversity and distribution of invasive plants in India

India hosts a rich diversity of invasive alien plant species across ecosystems. An inventory documented 1059 invasive species, belonging to 587 genera and 142 families, with most species originating from South America, North America and Europe. Protected areas and forest reserves are particularly affected, with studies documenting 41 major invasive plant species across 54 protected areas. Grasslands, coastal wetlands, and tropical deciduous forests are also vulnerable to invasions. Field surveys have also identified first records of species like Hypoestes phyllostachya in North India, indicating that invasions continue to spread into new regions. To map species distribution and identify invasion hotspots, tools such as MaxEnt modelling and remote sensing have been used. Another powerful tool called DNA barcoding has emerged for rapid identification of invasive plants, allowing faster and more reliable detection compared to traditional morphology based approaches.

Drivers and mechanisms of invasion

The spread of invasive plants is driven by climatic conditions, anthropogenic factors, and biological traits. Climate anomalies in temperature and precipitation strongly correlate with invasive species distribution. Human activities such as road construction, fires, and habitat modification create dispersal pathways and disturbances that favour invasive plant species. Biological traits, including high reproductive rates, dispersal abilities, and fungal endophyte associations, contribute to the successful establishment and expansion of invasive plants. Future climate scenarios predict further expansion of species such as Ageratum conyzoides, Ipomoea carnea, and Mikania micrantha, underscoring the need for predictive modelling to guide conservation planning.

Ecological impacts

Invasive plant species have profound ecological impacts that alter both the composition and function of ecosystems. In Manas National Park, the invasion by Chromolaena odorata and Mikania micrantha has been linked to a decrease in native plant diversity. Similarly, understorey invasive plant species in Palamau Tiger Reserve suppress tree seedlings and saplings, which poses a significant threat to forest regeneration and overall forest structure. Invasive shrubs such as Ageratina adenophora and Lantana camara exhibit advanced functional traits, including higher specific leaf area, chlorophyll content, nutrient uptake and leaf litter decomposition compared to native shrubs, which facilitates rapid spread and ecosystem alteration. In addition to the ecological effects, these invasions affect herbivore food sources and the livelihood of rural communities dependent on natural resources.

== Terrestrial ecosystems ==
This table lists 54 terrestrial plant species (flora) that are invasive in India.

Terrestrial Plant Invasive Alien Species (54 Species)
S.No.	Scientific name	Common name
1.	Abutilon crispum (L.) Brizicky	Bladder Mallow
2.	Acacia auriculiformis L.	Northern black wattle
3.	Acacia dealbata Link	Silver wattle
4.	Acacia mearnsii De Willd.	Black wattle
5.	Ageratina adenophora (Spreng.) King & H. Rob.	Crofton weed or sticky snakeroot
6.	Ageratina riparia (Regel)R. M.King & H. Rob.	Creeping crofton weed
7.	Alternanthera bettzickiana (Regel) G. Nichols	Red Calico plant
8.	Alternanthera brasiliana (L.) Kuntze	Brazilian joy weed
9.	Alternanthera ficoidea P. Beauv.	Joseph's coat
10.	Alternanthera paronychioides St. Hil.	Smooth joy weed
11.	Alternanthera pungens Kunth.	Khaki weed
12.	Alternanthera tenella Colla	Calico plant
13.	Antigonon leptopus Hook. & Arn.	Coral vine
14.	Argemone mexicana L.	Mexican poppy
15.	Bidens pilosa L.	Black Jack
16.	Cabomba caroliniana A. Gray	Carolina fanwort
17.	Cannabis sativa L.	Hemp/ Marijuana
18.	Centrosema molle Benth.	Butterfly-pea
19.	Cestrum aurantiacum Lindl	Orange cestrum
20.	Chromolaena odorata (L.) King & Robin.	Siam weed
21.	Cirsium arvense (L.) Scop.	Canada thistle
22.	Lepidium didymum L.	Lesser swinecress
23.	Cryptostegia grandiflora R. Br.	Rubber vine
24.	Cuscuta chinensis Lam.	Dodder
25.	Cytisus scoparius (L.) Link	Scotch broom
26.	Dactylandra welwitschii Hook. f.	Badi Aankh
27.	Evolvulus nummularius (L.) L.	Round leaf Bindweed
28.	Dinebra retroflexa (Vahl) Panz.	Viper grass
29.	Diplachne fusca (L.) P.Beauv.	Brown flowered swamp grass
30.	Dysphania ambrosioides Mosyakin & Clemants	Mexican tea
31.	Erigeron bonariensis L.	Horseweed/ Butterweed
32.	Erigeron canadensis L.	Canadian horseweed
33.	Mesosphaerum suaveolens (L.) Kuntze	Pig nut
34.	Ipomoea eriocarpa R. Br.	Purple morning glory
35.	Ipomoea carnea Jacq.	Bush Morning Glory/Shrub Ipomoea
36.	Lantana camara L.	Lantana
37.	Muntingia calabura L.	Jamaican cherry
38.	Leucaena leucocephala (Lam.) de Wit	False/Horse tamarind
39.	Maesopsis eminii Engl.	Umbrella-tree
40.	Mikania micrantha Kunth	Mile-a-minute
41.	Mimosa diplotricha C. Wight ex Sauvalle var.	Giant sensitive plant
42.	Mimosa pigra L.	Cat claw mimosa
43.	Opuntia dillenii Haw.	Prickly pear
44.	Opuntia elatior Miller	Prickly pear
45.	Parthenium hysterophorus L.	Congress weed
46.	Cenchrus purpureus (Schumach.) Morrone	Elephant grass
47.	Neltuma juliflora (Sw.) Raf.	Mesquite
48.	Pueraria montana var. lobata (Willd.) Sanjappa & Pradeep	Kudzu
49.	Senna spectabilis (DC.) Irwin & Barneby	Calceolaria shower
50.	Solanum elaeagnifolium Cavanilles	Silverleaf nightshade
51.	Solanum mauritianum Scop.	Bugweed
52.	Sphagneticola trilobata (L.) Pruski	Singapore daisy
53.	Typha angustifolia L.	Lesser bulrush
54.	Ulex europaeus L.	Common gorse

== Aquatic ecosystems ==
This table includes all 56 species across aquatic plants, inland fishes, marine species, and microbes found in freshwater/brackish water environments.

Invasive Alien Species in Aquatic Ecosystems (56 Species)
S.No.	Group	Scientific name	Common name
		Aquatic Plants (8 Species)	
1.	Aquatic Plant	Alternanthera philoxeroides (Mart.) Griseb.	Alligator weed
2.	Aquatic Plant	Pontederia crassipes Mart.	Water hyacinth
3.	Aquatic Plant	Ipomoea carnea Jacq.	Pink morning glory
4.	Aquatic Plant	Lemna perpusilla Torr.	Minute duckweed
5.	Aquatic Plant	Lythrum salicaria L.	Purple loosestrife
6.	Aquatic Plant	Marsilea quadrifolia	Common Water Clover
7.	Aquatic Plant	Myriophyllum aquaticum (Vell.) Verdc.	Parrot's feather
8.	Aquatic Plant	Salvinia auriculata Aubl (syn. S. molesta)	Butterfly fern
		Inland Fishes (14 Species)	
9.	Inland Fish	Clarias gariepinus	African catfish
10.	Inland Fish	Cyprinus carpio	Common carp
11.	Inland Fish	Gambusia affinis	Western Mosquito fish/ Topminnow
12.	Inland Fish	Gambusia holbrooki	Eastern Mosquito fish
13.	Inland Fish	Mylopharyngodon piceus	Black carp
14.	Inland Fish	Oreochromis mossambicus	Mozambique tilapia
15.	Inland Fish	Oreochromis niloticus	Nile tilapia
16.	Inland Fish	Poecillia reticulata	Guppy
17.	Inland Fish	Pterygoplichthys disjunctivus	Vermiculated sailfin catfish
18.	Inland Fish	Pterygoplichthys multiradiatus	Sucker mouth armored cat fish
19.	Inland Fish	Pterygoplichthys pardalis	Amazon sailfin catfish
20.	Inland Fish	Pterygoplichthys anisitsi	Paraná Sailfin Catfish
21.	Inland Fish	Pygocentrus nattereri	Red Piranha
22.	Inland Fish	Aristichthys nobilis	Bighead
		Marine Species (19 Species)	
23.	Marine Algae	Kappaphycus alvarezii	Elkhorn sea moss
24.	Marine Algae	Monostorma oxyspermum	Seaweed
25.	Marine Scyphozoa	Phyllorhiza punctata (Lendenfield 1884)	Phyllorhiza puncta Lendenfield, 1884
26.	Marine Scyphozoa	Pelagia noctiluca (Forsskal, 1775)	Pelagia noctiluca Forsskal, 1775
27.	Marine Anthozoa	Carijoa riisei	Snowflake coral / Branched pipe coral
28.	Marine Anthozoa	Tubastrea coccinea (Lesson, 1829)	Orange soft coral
29.	Marine Ctenophora	Beroe ovata (Bruguiere, 1789)	
30.	Marine Ctenophora	Beroe cucumis (Fabricius, 1780)	
31.	Marine Ctenophora	Vallicula multiformis (Rankin, 1956)	
32.	Marine Bivalve	Mytilopsis sallei (Recluz, 1849)	Caribbean false mussel
33.	Marine Bivalve	Perna perna (Linnaeus, 1758)	
34.	Marine Hydrozoa	Ectopleura crocea (Agassiz, 1862)	Pink-mouth hydroid
35.	Marine Polycheates	Ficopomatus enigmaticus (Fauvel, 1923)	Australian tube worm
36.	Marine Polycheates	Lumrineris japonica (Marenzeller, 1879)	
37.	Marine Amphipods	Jassa marmorata Holemes, 1905	
38.	Marine Decapods	Penaeus vannamei Boone, 1931	
39.	Marine Bryozoa	Membranipora membranacea (Linnaeus, 1767)	Coffin box
40.	Marine Ascidian	Microcosmus curvus (Tokioka, 1954)	Scaly tunicate
41.	Marine Ascidian	Didemnum candidum Savigny, 1816	
		Aquatic Microbes (Freshwater/Brackish) (15 Species)	
42.	Microbe (Fungus)	Aphanomyces invadans	
43.	Microbe (Fungus)	Enterocytozoon hepatopenaei	
44.	Microbe (Bacteria)	Edwardsiella tarda	
45.	Microbe (Bacteria)	Flavobacterium Sp	
46.	Microbe (Virus)	White spot syndrome Virus (WSSV)	
47.	Microbe (Virus)	Infectious Hypodermal and Haematopoietic Necrosis Virus (IHHNV)	
48.	Microbe (Virus)	Yellow head virus (YHV)	
49.	Microbe (Virus)	Infectious myonecrosis virus (IMNV)	
50.	Microbe (Virus)	Monodon Baculovirus (MBV)	
51.	Microbe (Virus)	Hepatopancreatic parvovirus (HPV)	
52.	Microbe (Virus)	Laem Singh Virus	
53.	Microbe (Virus)	Carp edema virus	
54.	Microbe (Virus)	Cyvirus cyprinidallo2	
55.	Microbe (Virus)	Ranavirus	
56.	Microbe (Virus)	Tilapia Lake virus	

== Agriculture ecosystems ==
Invasive Alien Species in Agriculture Ecosystems (46 Listed Species)
S.No.	Group	Scientific name	Common name
Fungus			
1.	Fungus	Hemileia vastatrix	Coffee rust
2.	Fungus	Phytophthora infestans	Late blight of potato
3.	Fungus	Urocystis tritici	Flag smut of wheat
4.	Fungus	Puccinia carthami	Rust of chrysanthemum
5.	Fungus	Venturia inaequalis	Apple Scab
6.	Fungus	Plasmopara viticola	Downy mildew of grapes
7.	Fungus	Peronosclerospora sacchari	Downy mildew of maize
8.	Fungus	Magnaporthe grisea	Blast of paddy
9.	Fungus	Fusarium verticillioides	Foot rot of Rice
10.	Fungus	Phyllachora sacchari	Leaf spot of sorghum
11.	Fungus	Oidium heaveae	Powdery mildew of rubber
12.	Fungus	Phytophthora nicotianae	Tobacco black shank
13.	Fungus	Sphaeropsis spp.	Canker of apple
14.	Fungus	Synchytrium endobioticum	Potato wart
15.	Fungus	Fusarium oxysporum f.sp cubense (TR4)	Fusarium wilt of Banana
16.	Fungus	Plasmopara halstedii	Downy mildew of sunflower
Bacteria			
17.	Bacteria	Xanthomonas campestris p.v. campestris	Black rot of crucifers
18.	Bacteria	Agrobacterium tumefaciens	Crown gall of apple/pear
19.	Bacteria	Rhizobium rhizogenes	Hairy root of apple/pear
20.	Bacteria	Erwinia amylovora	Fire blight of pear
21.	Bacteria	Xanthomonas oryzae p.v. oryzae	Bacterial leaf blight of paddy
Virus			
22.	Virus	Banana Bunchy Top Virus (Babu virus)	Banana bunchy top
23.	Virus	Sunflower necrosis illar virus	Sunflower necrosis
24.	Virus	Peanut stripe virus	Bud necrosis
Nematode			
25.	Nematode	Globodera rostochiensis	Potato golden nematode
Invasive Insects			
26.	Insect/Mite	Aceria guerreronis Keifer	Coconut eriophyid mite
27.	Insect	Aleurodicus dispersus Russell	Spiralling white fly
28.	Insect	Aleurodicus rugioperculatus Martin	Rugose spiraling whitefly
29.	Insect	Bemisia tabaci Gennadius	Silver leaf whitefly
30.	Insect	Eriosoma lanigerum (Hausmann)	Woolly apple aphid
31.	Insect	Heteropsylla cubana Crawford	Subabul psyllid
32.	Insect	Hypothenemus hampei Ferrari	Coffee berry borer beetle
33.	Insect	Icerya purchasi Maskell	Cottony cushion scale
34.	Insect	Leptocybe invasa (Fisher and Lasalle)	Eucalyptus gall wasp/ Blue gum chalcid
35.	Insect	Liriomyza trifolii (Burgess)	American serpentine leaf miner
36.	Insect	Orthezia insignis Browne	Lantana bug
37.	Insect	Paracoccus marginatus Williams & Granara de Willink	Papaya mealybug
38.	Insect	Phenacoccus madeirensis	Madeira mealybug
39.	Insect	Phenacoccus solenopsis Tinsley	Cotton mealybug
40.	Insect	Plutella xylostella Linnaeus	Diamond back moth
41.	Insect	Pseudococcus jackbeardsleyi Gimpel and Miller	Banana mealybug
42.	Insect	Compstockaspis perniciosa (Constock)	San Jose scale
43.	Insect	Quadrastichus erythrinae Kim	Erythrina gall wasp
44.	Insect	Tuta absoluta (Meyrick)	Tomato Pinworm
45.	Insect	Pineus pini (Macquart)	Pine woolly aphid
46.	Insect	Phthorimaea operculella (Zeller)	Potato tuber moth

== Island ecosystems ==
Invasive Alien Species of Major Islands (14 Species)
S.No.	Group	Scientific name	Common name
		Insects	
1.	Insect	Citripestis eutraphera	Mango borer
2.	Insect	Anoplolepis gracilipes	yellow crazy ant
		Cnidaria	
1.	Cnidaria	Carijoa riisei	Snowflake coral
		Mollusca	
1.	Mollusca	Lissachatina fulica	Giant African Snail
		Fishes	
1.	Fish	Oreochromis mossambiscus	Mozambique tilapia
2.	Fish	Heteropneustes fossilis	Asian stinging catfish
		Amphibian	
1.	Amphibian	Hoplobatrachus tigerinus	Indian bullfrog
		Reptile	
1.	Reptile	Calotes versicolor	Garden lizard
		Birds	
1.	Bird	Acridotheres tristis	Common Myna
2.	Bird	Passer domesticus	House sparrow
		Mammals	
1.	Mammal	Axis axis	Chital/Spotted deer
2.	Mammal	Axis porcinus	Indian Hog deer
3.	Mammal	Muntiacus muntjak	Indian muntjac
4.	Mammal	Elephas maximus	Asian elephant
