= Pleco =

Plecostomus, pleco, or plec refers to several species of freshwater loricariid catfish commonly sold as aquarium fish:

- Hypostomus plecostomus
- Hypostomus punctatus
- Pterygoplichthys multiradiatus
- Pterygoplichthys pardalis
- Ancistrus cirrhosus

Pleco may also refer to:

- Pleco Software, an English–Sinitic dictionary application for iOS and Android devices, which uses the traditional Chinese character for "fish" (魚 yú) in its icon.

== See also ==
- Plecostomus (disambiguation)
