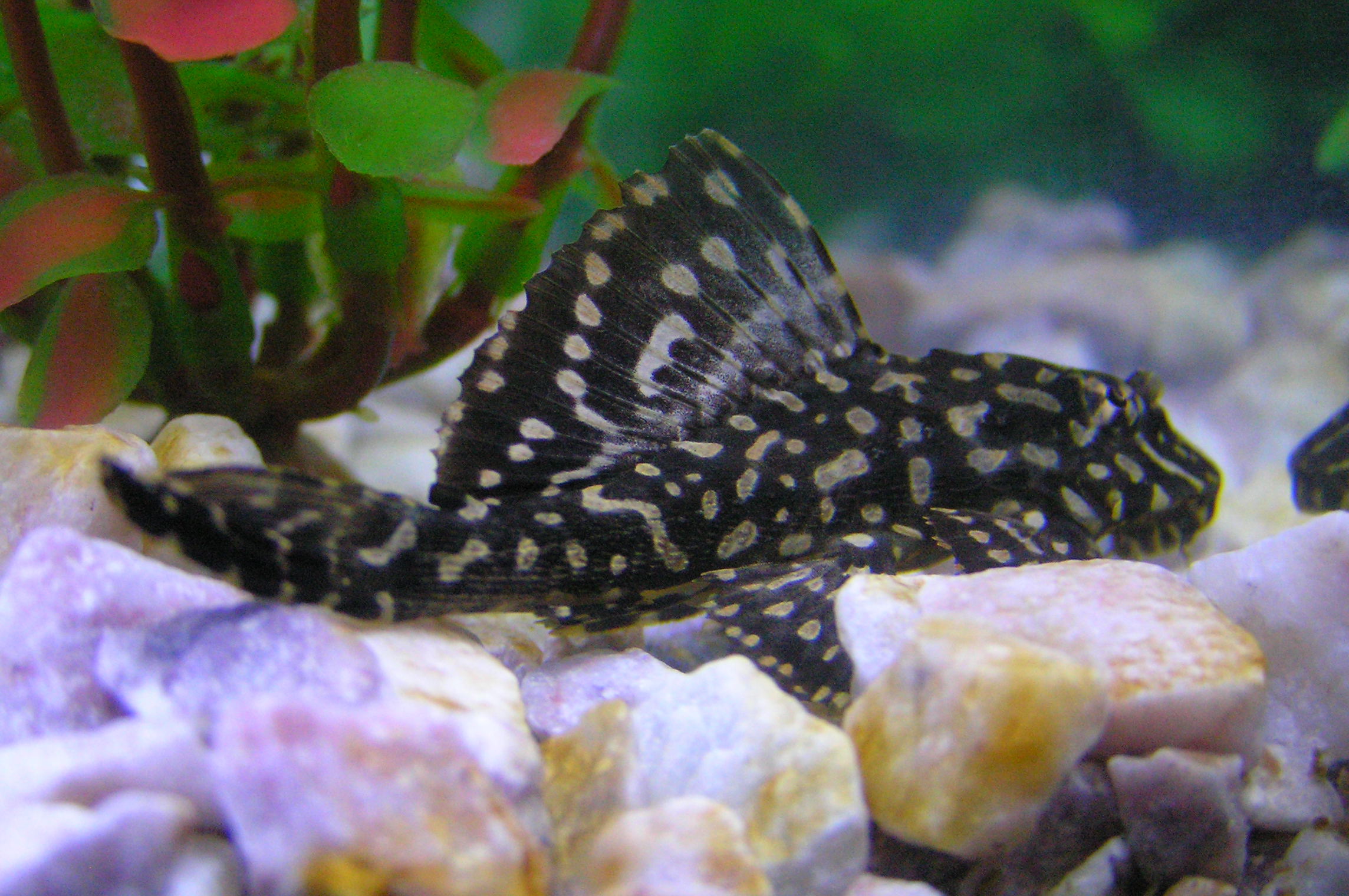

Conservation status
- Least Concern (IUCN 3.1)

Scientific classification
- Kingdom: Animalia
- Phylum: Chordata
- Class: Actinopterygii
- Division: Teleostei
- Order: Siluriformes
- Family: Loricariidae
- Subfamily: Hypostominae
- Tribe: Pterygoplichthyini
- Genus: Pterygoplichthys
- Species: P. joselimaianus

Binomial name
- Pterygoplichthys joselimaianus (C. Weber, 1991)

= Pterygoplichthys joselimaianus =

Gold spot pleco

Species of fish

Pterygoplichthys joselimaianus, also known as the Gold spot pleco or the Marbled sailfin pleco, is a species of armored catfish. It is endemic to Brazil, occurring in the Tocantins River basin. It is often mistaken for Pterygoplichthys pardalis or Pterygoplichthys gibbiceps.

In the aquarium trade, it may be referred to by its L-number, being L001 or L022.

== Description ==
P. joselimaianus has a dorsoventrally flattened body, dark brown in colour with light "gold" spots covering the whole body and fins. It has a large dorsal fin with 10 rays, characteristic of the Pterygoplichthys genus. On all fins the first ray is thicker, and on the pectoral fins there are visible spikes. It's a large fish, growing to a length of around 38.1 centimetres (15.0 in) SL.

These fish prefer temperatures ranging between 26 and 29 degrees Celsius, and pH between 6.5 and 7.5.

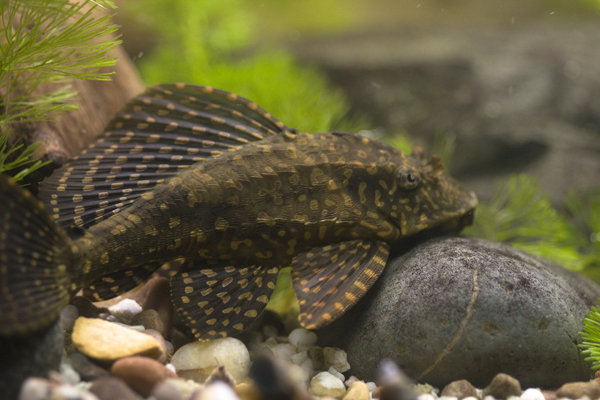
P. joselimaianus in an aquarium.

== Etymology ==
The fish is named in honor of ichthyologist José Lima de Figueiredo (b. 1943), of the Museu de Zoologia da Universidade de São Paulo, because of his support and observations on the species covered in the author's paper.
