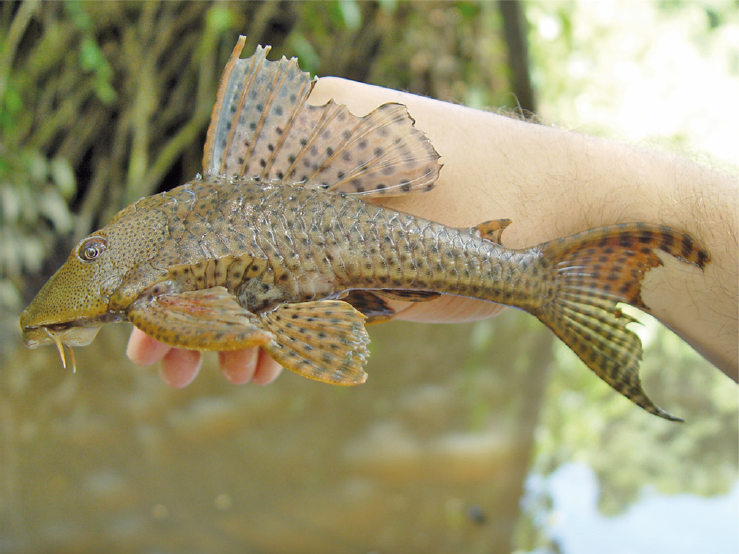
- An individual from the Commewijne River Basin, published along with the 2012 revision of the Hypostomus plecostomus type series

Conservation status
- Least Concern (IUCN 3.1)

Scientific classification
- Kingdom: Animalia
- Phylum: Chordata
- Class: Actinopterygii
- Division: Teleostei
- Order: Siluriformes
- Family: Loricariidae
- Subfamily: Hypostominae
- Genus: Hypostomus
- Species: H. plecostomus

Binomial name
- Hypostomus plecostomus (Linnaeus, 1758)

Synonyms
- Acipenser plecostomus Linnaeus, 1758; Hypostomus guacari Lacepède, 1803; Loricaria flava Shaw, 1804; Plecostomus bicirrosus Gronow, 1854; Plecostomus brasiliensis Bleeker, 1864; Plecostomus plecostomus Linnaeus, 1758; Pterygoplichthys plecostomus Linnaeus, 1758

= Hypostomus plecostomus =

Suckermouth catfish

Species of fish

Hypostomus plecostomus, also known as the suckermouth catfish or spotted pleco, is a tropical freshwater fish belonging to the armored catfish family (Loricariidae), named for the longitudinal rows of armor-like scutes that cover the upper parts of the head and body (the lower surface of head and abdomen is naked soft skin). They grow up to 50 cm (19.7 in) standard length, and live for 7–8 years in the wild, or 10–15 in captivity. Although the name Hypostomus plecostomus is often used to refer to common plecostomus sold in aquarium shops, most are actually members of other genera than Hypostomus.

Suckermouth catfish are of little or no value as a food fish, although they are at least occasionally consumed over their native range. A demand exists for them, however, as a bottom cleaner in the aquarium trade.

== Distribution and habitat ==
This species' native range is tropical northeastern South America; it naturally occurs in northeastern Brazil, the Guianas, and Trinidad and Tobago. Confusingly, the name Hypostomus plecostomus (or Plecostomus plecostomus) has sometimes been incorrectly used for several more-or-less similar loricariid catfishes, both in the popular and scientific literature. For example, it has sometimes been suggested that it occurs in southern Central America, but this is a different species, Hemiancistrus aspidolepis (also known under another synonym, Hypostomus panamensis).

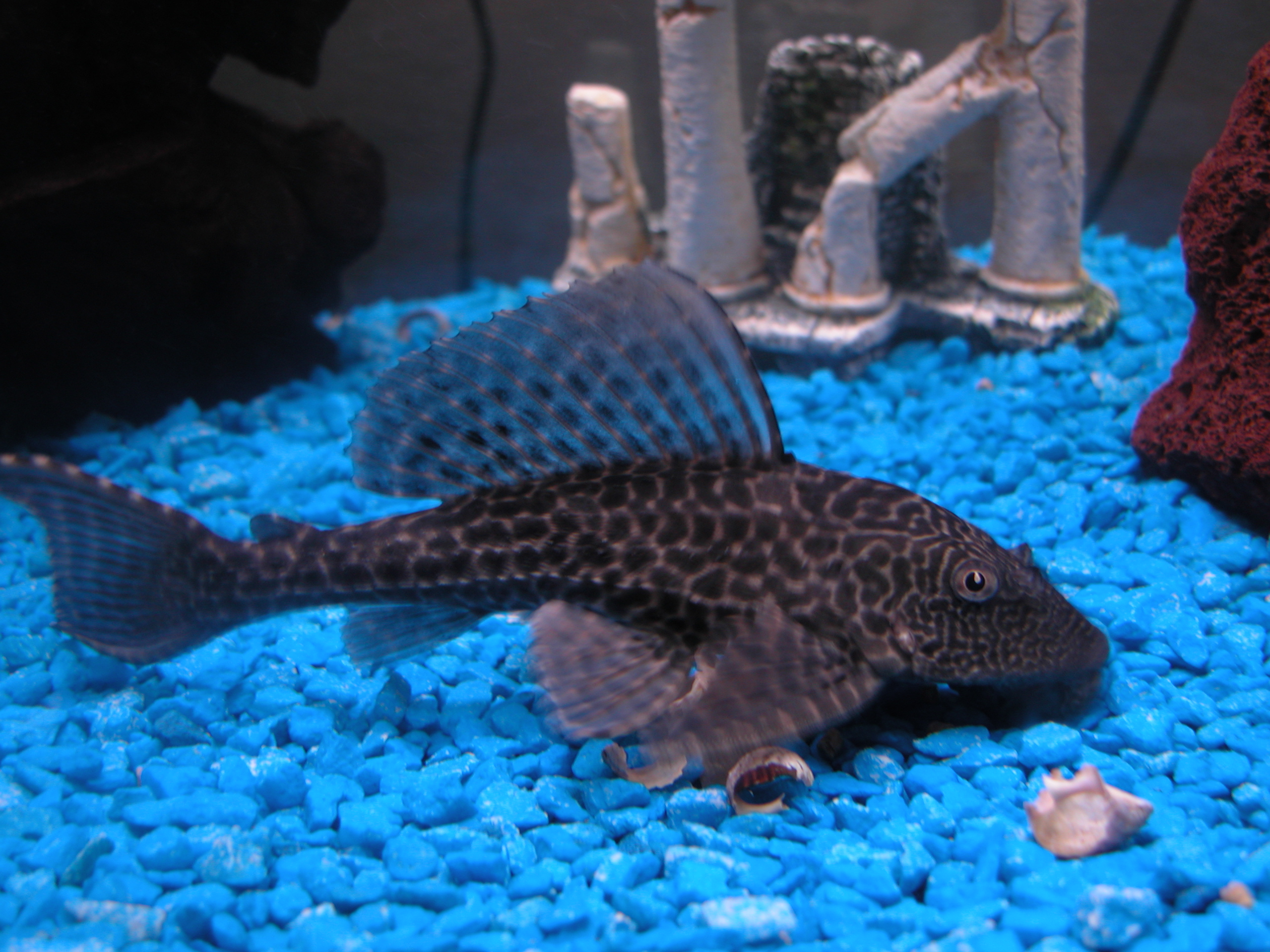
The invasive Pterygoplichthys pardalis has been repeatedly erroneously reported as H. plecostomus, though the latter species is restricted to the rivers of the Guianas.

Some Loricariidae species have been widely introduced to several countries around the world and reported as H. plecostomus, but this is incorrect, and the concerned species belong to the genus Pterygoplichthys (either P. pardalis, P. disjunctivus, P. anisitsi, or P. multiradiatus). In the United States, a Pterygoplichthys species has been introduced to some regions in the South, most likely released by aquarists into the local waters. For example, they are present in a lake in the neighborhood of Hammock Trace Preserve in Melbourne, Florida. In Texas, reproducing populations occur in spring-influenced habitats of the San Antonio River (Bexar County), Comal Springs (Comal County), San Marcos River (Hays County), and San Felipe Creek (Val Verde County), as well as in drainage canals in the Rio Grande Valley and Houston.

The same identification issues have spread in the literature regarding the invasive catfishes in Taiwan, with H. plecostomus being one of the numerous names used to designate the species: DNA studies showed the alien fishes were actually P. pardalis and P. disjunctivus (that hybridise extensively).

H. plecostomus prefers to live in water between 22 and 30 °C (72 and 86 °F), with a pH between 6.5 and 7.5.

== Diet ==
Hypostomus plecostomus is named for its sucker-like mouth, which allows it to adhere to a surface, as well as to hold and rasp at food, including newly hatched and baby golden apple snails and Malaysian trumpet snails. This omnivorous species also feeds on algae, aquatic plants, and small crustaceans.

== Physiology ==
Hypostomus plecostomus is one of many species of fishes that are able to breathe air. Hypostomus plecostomus relies on its gills for respiration in normal and slightly hypoxic water, and the less oxygen present in the water, the more frequently it surfaces to breathe air. The air is taken to the stomach where the oxygen is absorbed, and the air can be kept in the stomach to increase buoyancy, which may help it to feed on vegetation.

== In the aquarium ==
H. plecostomus is one of a number of species commonly referred to as "plecostomus" or "common pleco" by aquarists. These fish are sold when they are young and small, but in the wild, they can grow to be a maximum size of 50 cm (20 in). In captivity, however, a full-grown H. plecostomus only reaches 15 in (38 cm) on average, which could be explained by the subpar oxygen levels in most home aquaria and other practices of bad fish husbandry. In the aquarium trade, this dark-colored, bottom-feeding, nocturnal catfish is often purchased for its ability to clean algae from fish tanks, but it also contributes waste to the nitrogen cycle. It is difficult for other fish to harass, both due to the semiaggressive nature of the fish and its thick armor.

== Invasive species ==
In Bangladesh, the species, among some other suckermouth catfishes, has become invasive. The government is currently on its way to impose a ban on the farming, hatchling production, breeding, marketing, and trading of the fish. It has also raised serious concern in India, Malaysia, Indonesia and Sri Lanka. In September 2024, the Selangor state government in Malaysia allocated RM50,000 (approximately US$11,533) as an incentive to capture 50,000 kg of the fish in the Langat River.

In the Philippines, two very similar species, Pterygoplichthys disjunctivus and P. pardalis, were initially misidentified as H. plecostomus due to them sharing the local common names of "janitor fish" and "pleco". They were introduced in the 1970s by the aquarium trade and have since become highly invasive in the Laguna de Bay (including the tributaries Marikina River) and Agusan Marsh.

== Naming ==
=== Common names ===
A large variety of common names is used to describe H. plecostomus, where plecostomus and the shortened "pleco" are interchangeable in all common names. The names include:

- algae sucker/eater
- pez diablo (devil fish)
- pleco
- water old lady (vieja de la agua)
- janitor fish
- municipal fish – ikan bandaraya in Malay
- suckermouth catfish
- sweeper fish – ikan sapu sapu in Indonesian
- "ikan sapu" in indonesia “broomfish”
- "Sapu-Sapu" fish the Sweep Sweep Fish
- crocodile fish (not to be confused with Papilloculiceps longiceps, which is originally known as the crocodile fish or tentacled flathead)

=== Taxonomy ===
The species' scientific name, Hypostomus plecostomus, is derived from the Greek words hupó (ὑπό 'under'), stóma (στόμα 'mouth'), and plékō (πλέκω 'fold').

Many of the common names used to identify H. plecostomus are also used for other species, which augments the confusion surrounding H. plecostomus and other Loricariidae such as H. punctatus, Pterygoplichthys multiradiatus and P. pardalis. In 2012, Weber, Covain, and Fisch-Muller showed the type series of Carl Linnaeus was heterogenous and comprised two species: H. plecostomus (for which the authors designate a lectotype) and H. watwata.

== See also ==
- List of freshwater aquarium fish species
