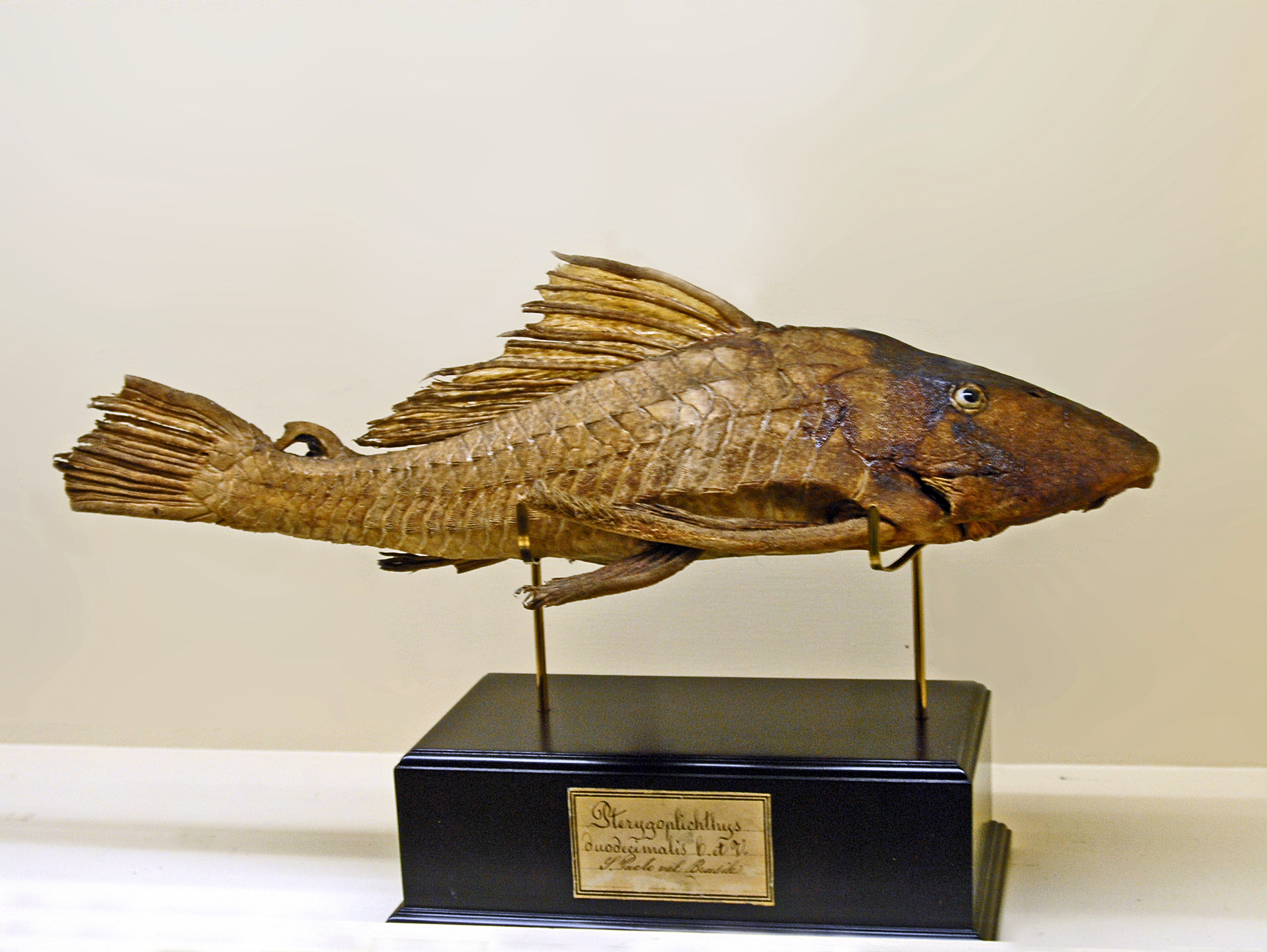
- Museum specimen of Pterygoplichthys etanculatus

Conservation status
- Least Concern (IUCN 3.1)

Scientific classification
- Kingdom: Animalia
- Phylum: Chordata
- Class: Actinopterygii
- Division: Teleostei
- Order: Siluriformes
- Family: Loricariidae
- Subfamily: Hypostominae
- Tribe: Pterygoplichthyini
- Genus: Pterygoplichthys
- Species: P. etantaculatus

Binomial name
- Pterygoplichthys etantaculatus (Spix & Agassiz, 1829)

= Pterygoplichthys etentaculatus =

Species of fish

Pterygoplichthys etantaculatus, is a species of armored catfish.

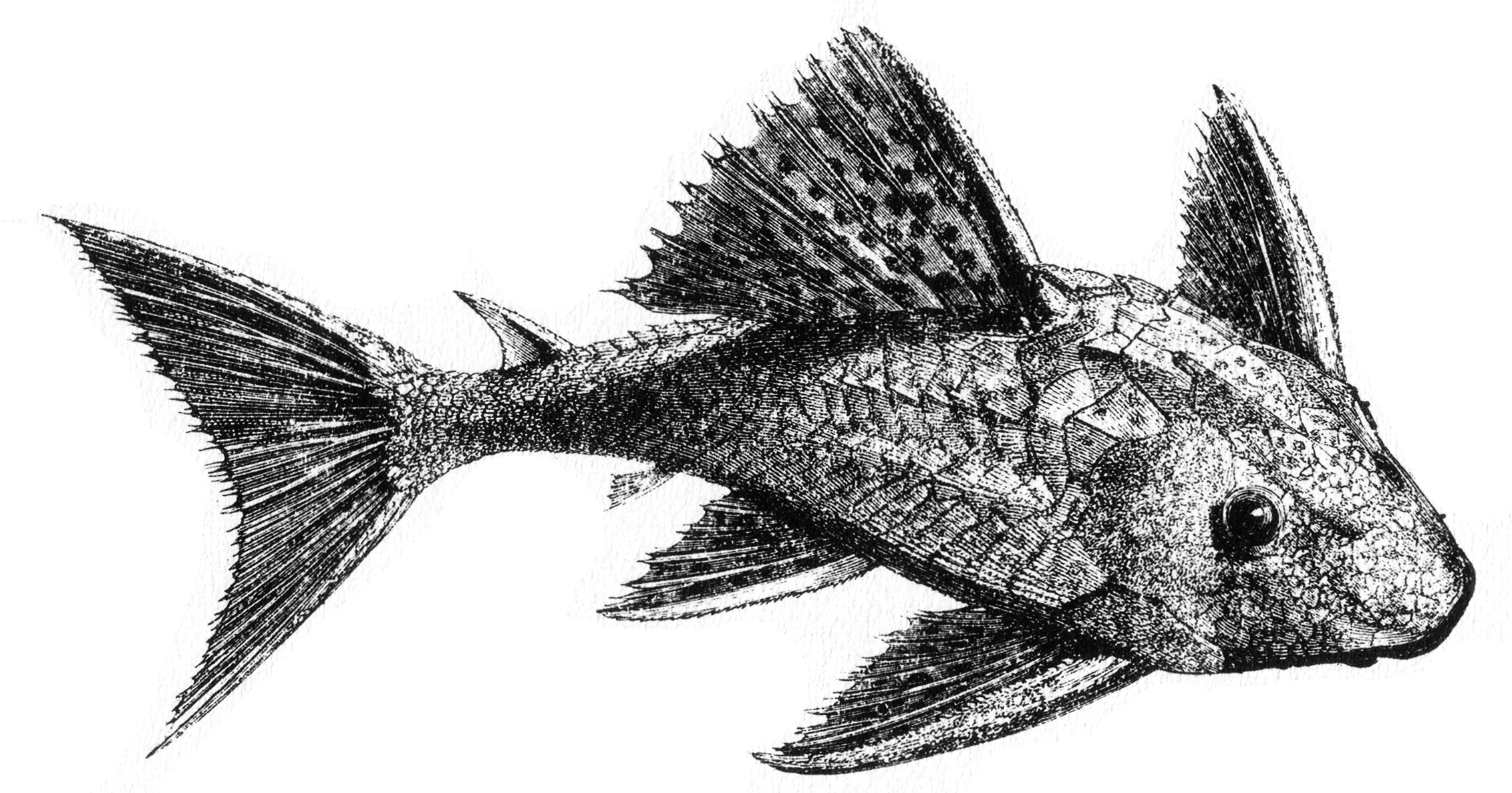
Illustration of Pterygoplichthys etantaculatus

== Distribution and habitat ==
This species is present in Brazil. It lives in freshwater of the São Francisco River basin.

== Description ==
This species grows to a length of about 30 centimetres (12 in) SL.
