= Plecostomus =

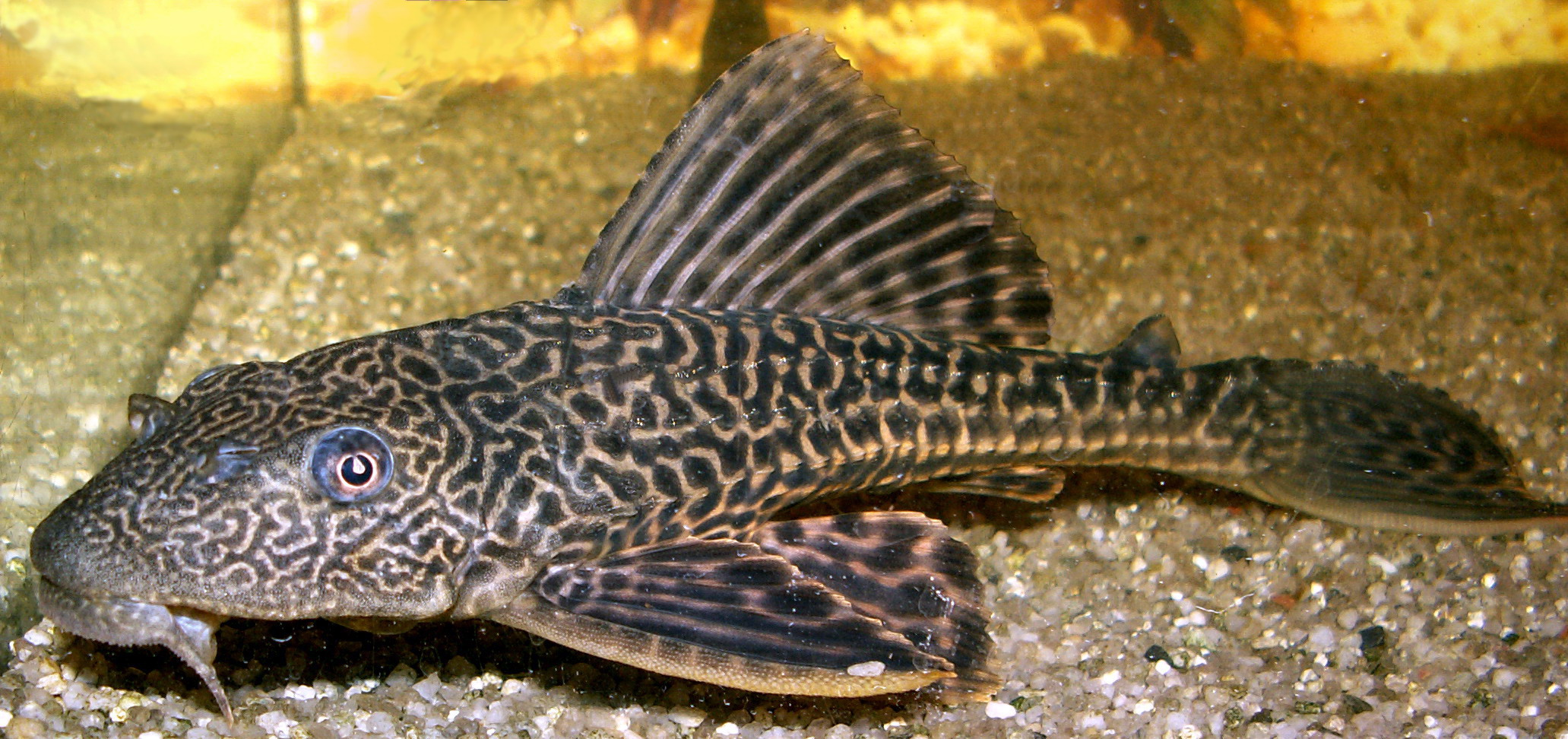
Pterygoplichthys multiradiatus

Plecostomus, pleco, or plec is the common name of several species of freshwater loricariid catfish commonly sold as aquarium fish.

These include:

- Pterygoplichthys gibbiceps
- Hypostomus plecostomus
- Hypostomus punctatus
- Pterygoplichthys multiradiatus
- Pterygoplichthys pardalis
- Panaqolus maccus

It is also used as part of the common names of various similar species of loricariids. The superficially similar loach Beaufortia kweichowensis is also sometimes known as the "butterfly plec", despite not being closely related to the Loracariidae.

== See also ==
- Loricariidae
- Ancistrus, often incorrectly called "bristlenose pleco"
