= Pterygoplichthys xinguensis =

Conservation status
- Least Concern (IUCN 3.1)

Scientific classification
- Kingdom: Animalia
- Phylum: Chordata
- Class: Actinopterygii
- Division: Teleostei
- Order: Siluriformes
- Family: Loricariidae
- Genus: Pterygoplichthys
- Species: P. xinguensis

Binomial name
- Pterygoplichthys xinguensis (C. Weber, 1991)

Synonyms
- Glyptoperichthys xinguensis C. Weber, 1991

Species of catfish

Pterygoplichthys xinguensis is a species of catfish in the family Loricariidae. It is native to South America, where it occurs in the Xingu River basin in Brazil. The species reaches 37.5 cm (14.8 in) in total length, can weigh up to 580 g (20 oz), and is known to be a facultative air-breather.

Pterygoplichthys xinguensis sometimes appears in the aquarium trade, where it is often referred to by its associated L-number, which is L-083, although that number may not exclusively refer to this species.
