= Pterygoplichthys parnaibae =

Conservation status
- Least Concern (IUCN 3.1)

Scientific classification
- Kingdom: Animalia
- Phylum: Chordata
- Class: Actinopterygii
- Division: Teleostei
- Order: Siluriformes
- Family: Loricariidae
- Genus: Pterygoplichthys
- Species: P. parnaibae

Binomial name
- Pterygoplichthys parnaibae (C. Weber, 1991)

Synonyms
- Glyptoperichthys parnaibae C. Weber, 1991; Glyptoperichthys parnaibe

Species of catfish

Pterygoplichthys parnaibae is a species of catfish in the family Loricariidae. It is a freshwater fish native to South America, where it occurs in the Parnaíba River basin in Brazil, for which it is named. The species reaches 29 cm (11 in) in standard length and is known to be a facultative air-breather.
