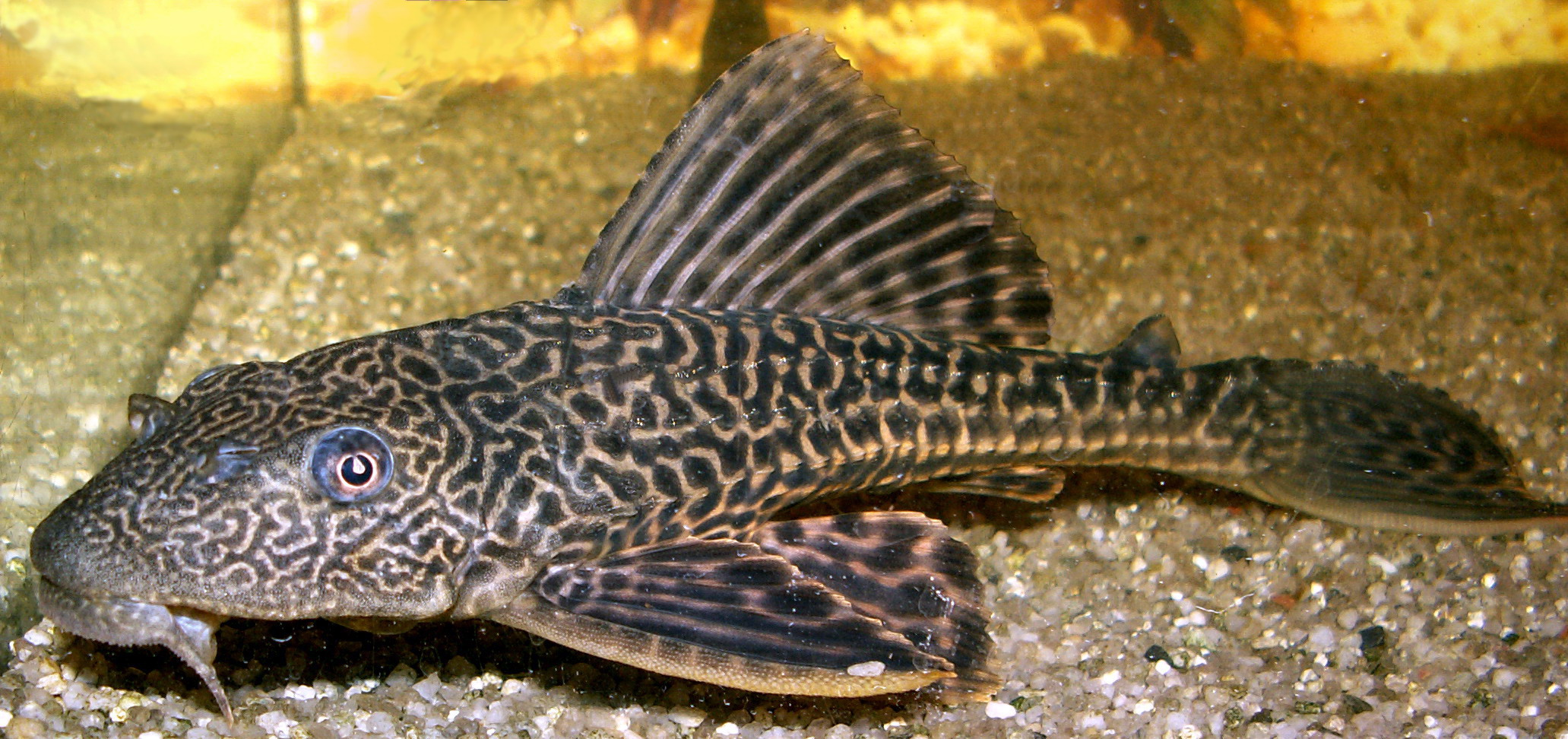

Conservation status
- Least Concern (IUCN 3.1)

Scientific classification
- Kingdom: Animalia
- Phylum: Chordata
- Class: Actinopterygii
- Division: Teleostei
- Order: Siluriformes
- Family: Loricariidae
- Subfamily: Hypostominae
- Tribe: Pterygoplichthyini
- Genus: Pterygoplichthys
- Species: P. multiradiatus

Binomial name
- Pterygoplichthys multiradiatus (J. Hancock, 1828)

Synonyms
- Hypostomus multiradiatus Hancock, 1828; Ancistrus multiradiatus (Hancock, 1828); Liposarcus multiradiatus (Hancock, 1828)

= Pterygoplichthys multiradiatus =

Species of fish

Pterygoplichthys multiradiatus is one of several tropical fish commonly known as Orinoco sailfin catfish, plecostomus (or plecos). It belongs to the armored catfish family (Loricariidae). Named for its sail-like dorsal fin, the part of its scientific name multiradiatus means "many-rayed" and refers to the rays of the dorsal fin. P. multiradiatus is one of a number of species commonly referred to as the common pleco by aquarists.

Other scientific names that were used (as synonyms) for P. multiradiatus include Hypostomus multiradiatus, Ancistrus multiradiatus, and Liposarcus multiradiatus. P. multiradiatus is sometimes confused with Pterygoplichthys pardalis, which is a different species of pleco. P. multiradiatus goes by a number of common names. It can be called the "long-fin armored catfish" in Hawaii, "sailfin catfish", "sailfish catfish", "many-rayed (multiradiatus) pleco" or "radiated ptero" in the United States, 多輻翼甲鯰 in Mandarin Chinese. P. multiradiatus is mottled brown/black and inhabits freshwater streams and lakes and in weedy, mud-bottomed canals in its native habitat: the Orinoco River basin in Venezuela. Its geographic distribution is 10°N - 1°N, 68°W - 61°W. This tropical, nocturnal bottom-dweller likes warm water at the temperature range of 23–27 °C (73–81 °F), pH range: 6.5–7.8, and dH range: 4–20.

P. multiradiatus browses on substrate, mainly feeding on benthic algae and aquatic weeds, but will also take worms, insect larvae and other bottom-dwelling invertebrates as food.

One of the large plecos (growing to a maximum of 50.0 centimetres (19.7 in) TL), the species prefer solitude and are relatively peaceful as an aquarium fish. They interact well with cichlids and other big fish, and should be kept in large tanks only and with plenty of rocks and driftwood in which to hide.

== Invasive introduction and range ==
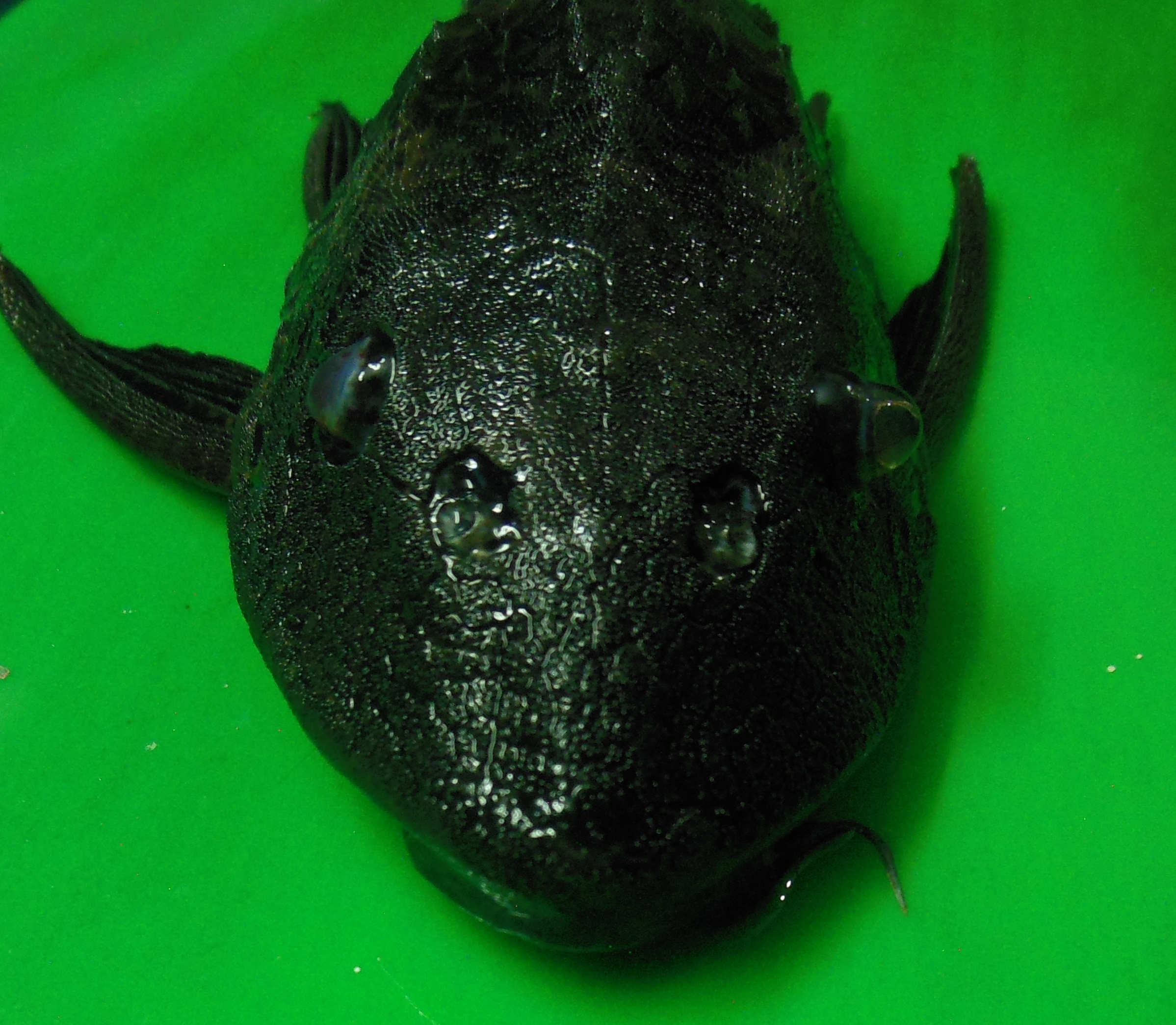
Front view

P. multiradiatus has been introduced to Taiwan, Puerto Rico, Florida, Hawaii, Texas, India, and Mexico, most likely as the result of escapes or releases from aquarium fish farms. This species is firmly established in these and other locations, where it is regarded as a harmful invasive species being relatively inedible to people and predators, causing damage to fishing gear, competing and harming against native species and disrupting environments by its burrowing activities. In this context its relative, Hypostomus plecostomus, has also been similarly implicated though it seems likely that in Asia, both or related species are implicated.

== See also ==
- List of freshwater aquarium fish species

== Other sources ==
- "Liposarcus multiradiatus". Integrated Taxonomic Information System.
- "Pterygoplichthys multiradiatus". Integrated Taxonomic Information System.
