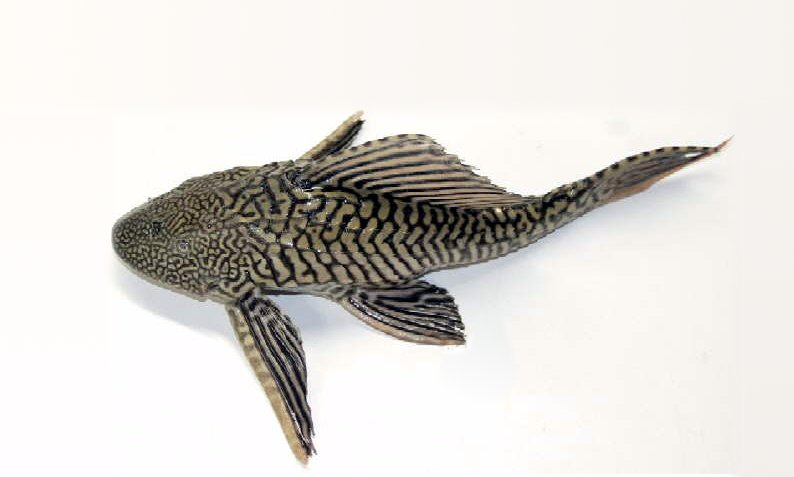
- Pterygoplichthys multiradiatus

Scientific classification
- Kingdom: Animalia
- Phylum: Chordata
- Class: Actinopterygii
- Division: Teleostei
- Order: Siluriformes
- Family: Loricariidae
- Subfamily: Hypostominae
- Tribe: Pterygoplichthyini
- Genus: Pterygoplichthys; T. N. Gill, 1858

Type species
- Hypostomus duodecimalis Spix & Agassiz, 1829

= Pterygoplichthys =

Genus of fishes

Pterygoplichthys, sometimes collectively known as janitor fish, is a genus of South American armored catfishes. These fish are commonly known as sailfin armoured catfish or sailfin plecs, especially in the aquarium trade.

== Etymology ==
Pterygoplichthys is derived from the Greek πτέρυγ- (pteryg-), meaning "wing", Όπλον (hoplon) - "shield" and ἰχθύς (ichthys) meaning "fish".

== Taxonomy ==
Pterygoplichthys has undergone much shifting in the past decades. Previously Liposarcus, Glyptoperichthys and Pterygoplichthys had been named as separate genera. Since then, these genera were recognized as synonyms of Pterygoplichthys by Armbruster, as the few differences between the genera were not deemed great enough to validate Glyptoperichthys and Liposarcus, and that recognizing these separate genera would leave neither Pterygoplichthys nor Glyptoperichthys as monophyletic.

== Species ==
There are currently 16 recognized species in this genus:

- Pterygoplichthys ambrosettii (Holmberg, 1893)
- Pterygoplichthys chrysostiktos (Birindelli, Zanata & Lima, 2007)
- Pterygoplichthys disjunctivus (C. Weber, 1991) (Vermiculated sailfin catfish)
- Pterygoplichthys etentaculatus (Spix & Agassiz, 1829)
- Pterygoplichthys gibbiceps (Kner, 1854) (Leopard pleco)
- Pterygoplichthys joselimaianus (C. Weber, 1991)
- Pterygoplichthys lituratus (Kner, 1854)
- Pterygoplichthys multiradiatus J. Hancock, 1828 (Orinoco sailfin catfish)
- Pterygoplichthys pardalis (Castelnau, 1855) (Amazon sailfin catfish)
- Pterygoplichthys parnaibae (C. Weber, 1991)
- Pterygoplichthys punctatus (Kner, 1854) (Corroncho)
- Pterygoplichthys scrophus (Cope, 1874)
- Pterygoplichthys undecimalis (Steindachner, 1878)
- Pterygoplichthys weberi Armbruster & Page, 2006
- Pterygoplichthys xinguensis (C. Weber, 1991)
- Pterygoplichthys zuliaensis C. Weber, 1991

Synonyms

- Pterygoplichthys anisitsi (C. H. Eigenmann & Kennedy, 1903); valid as P. ambrosettii

== Appearance and anatomy ==
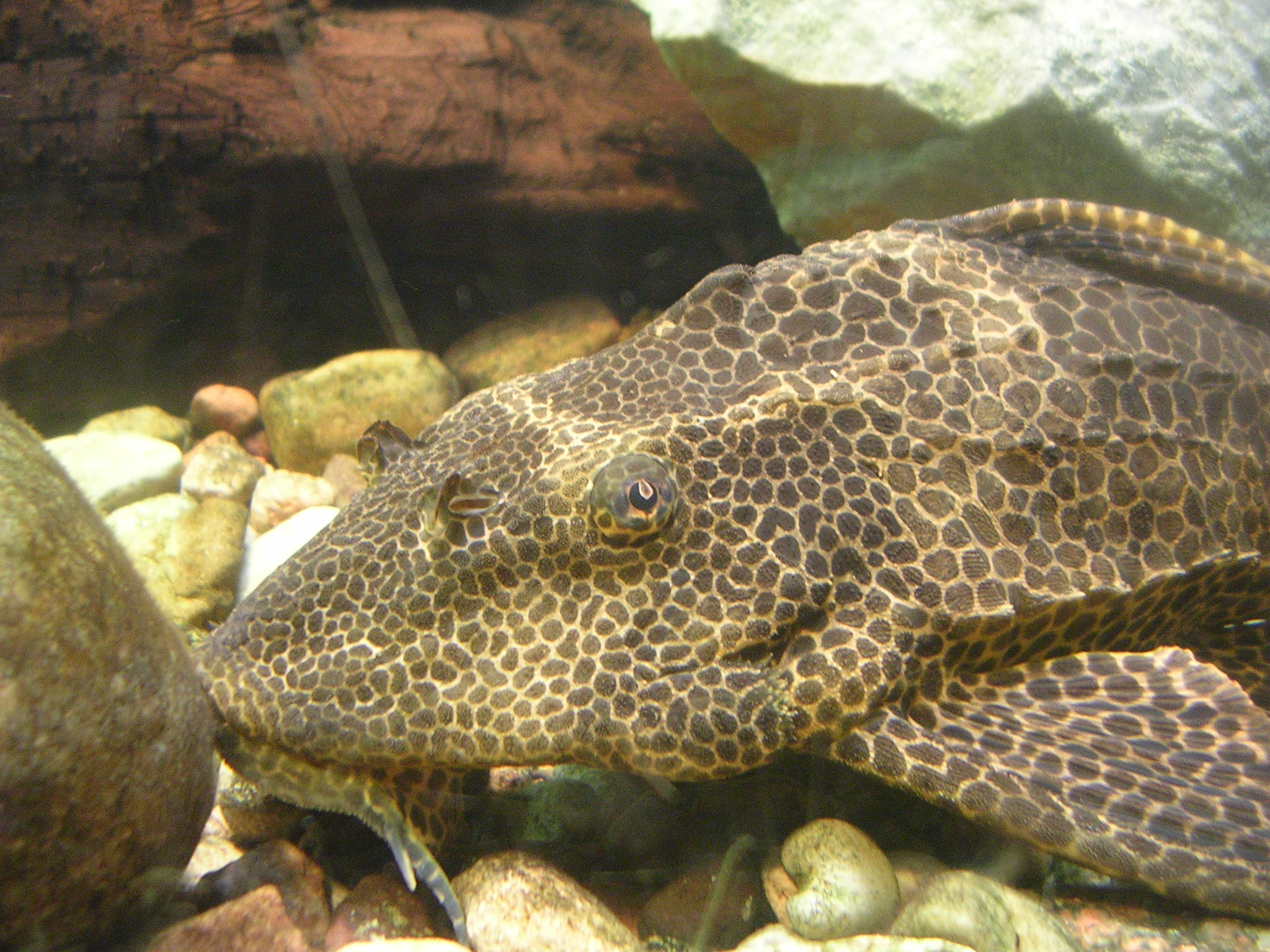
In P. gibbiceps, a crest exists over the back of the skull that was used to distinguish Glyptoperichthys species from Pterygoplichthys species.

Pterygoplichthys can be differentiated from most other loricariids due to their large dorsal fins with 9 or more (usually 10) dorsal fin rays, which gives them their common name "sailfin catfish". These fish have rows of armour plating covering the body; the abdomen is almost completely covered in small plates. Other characteristics of members of this genus include an underslung suckermouth, evertible cheek plates, adipose fin present, and an enlarged stomach connected to the dorsal abdominal wall by a connective tissue sheet. P. anisitsi, P. disjunctivus, P. multiradiatus, and P. pardalis lack cheek odontodes, but still possess the evertible cheek plates; this was previously used as a trait to determine these fish as part of the genus Liposarcus. Species of the P. gibbiceps group (species formerly classified in the genus Glyptoperichthys) are easily recognized by a large crest above the back of their skull.

Color pattern is generally dark brown with either darker spots or lighter spots or vermiculations. The adult size of a member of Pterygoplichthys can range from about 50–70 cm (20–28 in).

The stomach of Pterygoplichthys is greatly expanded with the posterior portion forming a long, thin sac that is highly vascularized.

== Distribution and habitat ==
Pterygoplichthys' habitat is most common in sluggish streams, floodplain lakes, and marshes. They are known from the Orinoco, Amazon, Magdalena, Maracaibo, Paraná, Parnaíba and São Francisco systems.

These fish have been introduced into many locations. Several species of Pterygoplichthys have been established in the United States in Florida, Hawaii, Nevada, and Texas. Established species include P. multiradiatus in Florida and Hawaii, P. disjunctivus in Florida, and P. anisitsi in Texas. Sailfin catfish are one of the more successful established exotic fish in Florida in terms of their range extension and abundance, yet their presence has not had any measurable effect on native fishes, although they have contributed significantly to the carrying capacity of some fish communities. Moreover, none of the 30 professional water managers, engineers, lake management, and shoreline stabilization company owners contacted in 2004 by a particular study considered erosion caused by the burrowing activity of loricariid catfishes a major problem, except in some man-made lakes in the southeastern part of the state.

In Mexico, P. multiradiatus is established in Campeche, Chiapas, and other localities in central and western Mexico, while P. pardalis has been found in southeastern Mexico. In the Philippines, where these fish are known as janitor fish, P. disjunctivus and P. pardalis have been found, these fish are considered a threat to the freshwater fish population; they are found in the Marikina River, Laguna de Bay and the Pasig River. P. multiradiatus has also been established in Puerto Rico and Taiwan.

In 2022 Hungary the species was first discovered in Lake Hévíz. After catching an documenting several more specimens the species could be identified with certainty. It was also established that the species has successfully colonised the lake and has been declared an invasive species.

In 2026 the genus was declared an invasive species exploding in Ciliwung river in Jakarta.

== Ecology ==
Their primary food is plant matter. Their diet consists of algae, aufwuchs, general plant matter and possibly carrion. They are grazing animals or scavengers as opposed to predator fish.

Pterygoplichthys are known for being kept out of water and sold alive in fish markets, surviving up to 30 hours out of water. Males excavate tunnels into mud banks where eggs are laid.

== In the aquarium ==
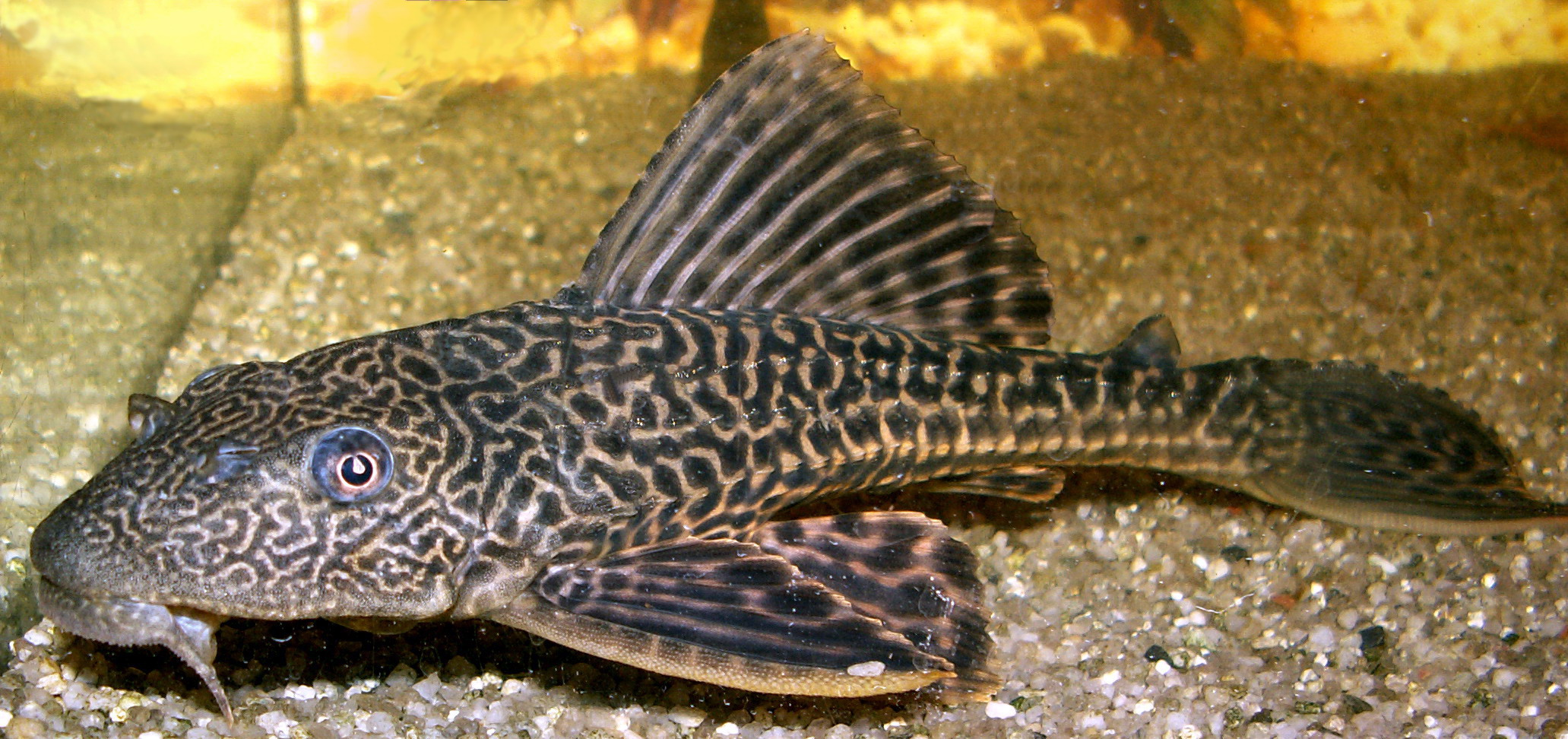
Pterygoplichthys multiradiatus, often sold as a common pleco, is an aquarium fish often purchased as an algae eater.

P. gibbiceps has been bred commercially in fish farms in Florida and Malaysia for the aquarium trade. P. multiradiatus and P. pardalis are both known as common plecos and are widely sold as algae eaters. However, most of them grow too large to be housed in an average home aquarium. In fact, in the wild, the Common Pleco can well exceed 2 feet (0.61 m) in length, and, as well as growing large, they also produce a lot of waste that can pollute the water.

== Trivia ==
- Pterygoplichthys is an exact anagram of Glyptoperichthys.
