= Citripestis sagittiferella =

Scientific classification
- Domain: Eukaryota
- Kingdom: Animalia
- Phylum: Arthropoda
- Class: Insecta
- Order: Lepidoptera
- Family: Pyralidae
- Genus: Citripestis
- Species: C. sagittiferella

Binomial name
- Citripestis sagittiferella (Moore, 1891)

Synonyms
- Nephopteryx sagittiferella Moore, 1891

Species of moth

Citripestis sagittiferella, the citrus fruit borer, is a species of snout moth in the genus Citripestis. It was described by Frederic Moore in 1891. It is found in Indonesia, Malaysia, Singapore and Thailand.

The wingspan is about 27 millimetres (1.1 in) long.

The larvae feed on Citrus species and are considered a pest.
