= Pterygoplichthys weberi =

Conservation status
- Least Concern (IUCN 3.1)

Scientific classification
- Kingdom: Animalia
- Phylum: Chordata
- Class: Actinopterygii
- Division: Teleostei
- Order: Siluriformes
- Family: Loricariidae
- Genus: Pterygoplichthys
- Species: P. weberi

Binomial name
- Pterygoplichthys weberi Armbruster & Page, 2006

Species of catfish

Pterygoplichthys weberi is a species of catfish in the family Loricariidae. It is native to South America, where it occurs in the basins of the Amazon River, the Japurá River, the Marañón River, and the Ucayali River in Colombia, Ecuador, and Peru. The species reaches 19.7 cm (7.8 in) in standard length and is known to be a facultative air-breather.

== Etymology ==
Its specific epithet, weberi, honors Claude Weber of the Natural History Museum of Geneva for his contributions to the systematics of the genus Pterygoplichthys and of loricariids in general.

== Aquarium trade ==
Pterygoplichthys weberi sometimes appears in the aquarium trade, where it may be referred to as the ranger pleco.
