= Hypostomus fonchii =

Conservation status
- Least Concern (IUCN 3.1)

Scientific classification
- Kingdom: Animalia
- Phylum: Chordata
- Class: Actinopterygii
- Order: Siluriformes
- Family: Loricariidae
- Genus: Hypostomus
- Species: H. fonchii

Binomial name
- Hypostomus fonchii C. Weber & Montoya-Burgos, 2002

Species of fish

Hypostomus fonchii is a species of catfish in the family Loricariidae. It is native to South America, where it occurs in the Cushabatay River basin, which is itself part of the Ucayali River drainage in Peru, as well as the Mamoré River basin in Bolivia. It is typically found in clear, high-altitude waters with large rocks, dead leaves and wood, an absence of aquatic vegetation, and a substrate of sand, clay, or pebbles. The species reaches 15.4 cm (6.1 in) SL.

== Etymology ==
The fish is named in honor of Fonchii Chang (1963–1999), a Peruvian ichthyologist of Chinese and Japanese ancestry, with the Museo de Historia Natural in Lima, Peru. She died in a boat accident near Lake Rimachi, Peru. While out doing research the boat sank and as she was wearing rubber boots, they filled with water and took her to the bottom, where she was shocked by an electric eel, who knocked her unconscious and she drowned.
