= Hypostomus dlouhyi =

Scientific classification
- Domain: Eukaryota
- Kingdom: Animalia
- Phylum: Chordata
- Class: Actinopterygii
- Order: Siluriformes
- Family: Loricariidae
- Genus: Hypostomus
- Species: H. dlouhyi

Binomial name
- Hypostomus dlouhyi C. Weber, 1985

Species of fish

Hypostomus dlouhyi is a species of catfish in the family Loricariidae. It is native to South America, where it occurs in the Yguazú River basin in the middle Paraná River drainage. The species reaches 24.5 cm (9.6 inches) SL and is believed to be a facultative air-breather.

== Etymology ==
The fish is named in honor of Czech-born biologist Carlo Dlouhy, of the Muséum d’histoire naturelle de Genève in Switzerland, who collected the holotype of the species.
