= Hypostomus paucipunctatus =

Scientific classification
- Kingdom: Animalia
- Phylum: Chordata
- Class: Actinopterygii
- Order: Siluriformes
- Family: Loricariidae
- Genus: Hypostomus
- Species: H. paucipunctatus

Binomial name
- Hypostomus paucipunctatus P. H. Carvalho & C. Weber, 2005

Species of catfish

Hypostomus paucipunctatus is a species of catfish in the family Loricariidae. It is native to South America, where it occurs in the Itacaiúnas River basin in Brazil. The species reaches 18.8 cm (7.4 inches) in standard length and is believed to be a facultative air-breather.

== Etymology ==
Its specific epithet, paucipunctatus, is derived from Latin and means "few-dotted", in reference to the color pattern sported by the species.
