= Hypostomus ericae =

Scientific classification
- Domain: Eukaryota
- Kingdom: Animalia
- Phylum: Chordata
- Class: Actinopterygii
- Order: Siluriformes
- Family: Loricariidae
- Genus: Hypostomus
- Species: H. ericae

Binomial name
- Hypostomus ericae P. H. Carvalho & C. Weber, 2005

Species of fish

Hypostomus ericae is a species of catfish in the family Loricariidae. It is native to South America, where it occurs in the upper Tocantins River drainage in Brazil. The species reaches 24 cm (9.4 inches) in total length. Its specific epithet, ericae, honors Erica Pellegrini Caramaschi, who collected the first specimens of the species. The fish was formally described as a species new to science in 2005 by Pedro Hollanda Carvalho and Claude Weber in 2005. Characteristics that distinguish it from other catfish in genus Hypostomus include the number of odontodes in the opercle; its colour pattern, which features widely spaced spots on its body; the presence of a buccal papilla; and the depth of its caudal peduncle.

== Etymology ==
The fish is named in honor of Erica Pellegrini Caramaschi, of the Universidade Federal do Rio de Janeiro, who helped collect the holotype, and for her “great” contributions to the knowledge of fish ecology.
