= Hypostomus waiampi =

Scientific classification
- Domain: Eukaryota
- Kingdom: Animalia
- Phylum: Chordata
- Class: Actinopterygii
- Order: Siluriformes
- Family: Loricariidae
- Genus: Hypostomus
- Species: H. waiampi

Binomial name
- Hypostomus waiampi P. H. Carvalho & C. Weber, 2005

Species of fish

Hypostomus waiampi is a species of catfish in the family Loricariidae. It is native to South America, where it occurs in the Cupixi River in the state of Amapá in Brazil. The species reaches 19.4 cm (7.6 inches) SL and is believed to be a facultative air-breather.

== Etymology ==
Its specific epithet, waiampi, refers to the Wayampi people who inhabit the Cupixi basin.
