= Pterygoplichthys scrophus =

Conservation status
- Least Concern (IUCN 3.1)

Scientific classification
- Kingdom: Animalia
- Phylum: Chordata
- Class: Actinopterygii
- Division: Teleostei
- Order: Siluriformes
- Family: Loricariidae
- Genus: Pterygoplichthys
- Species: P. scrophus

Binomial name
- Pterygoplichthys scrophus (Cope, 1874)

Synonyms
- Glyptoperichthys scrophus; Liposarcus scrophus

Species of catfish

Pterygoplichthys scrophus is a species of catfish in the family Loricariidae. It is native to South America, where it occurs in the basins of the Marañón River and the Ucayali River in Peru. The species reaches 27.5 cm (10.8 in) in standard length and is known to be a facultative air-breather.

Pterygoplichthys scrophus appears in the aquarium trade, where it may be known as the alligator pleco, the chocolate pleco, or the rhino pleco.
