= Pterygoplichthys chrysostiktos =

Conservation status
- Least Concern (IUCN 3.1)

Scientific classification
- Kingdom: Animalia
- Phylum: Chordata
- Class: Actinopterygii
- Order: Siluriformes
- Family: Loricariidae
- Genus: Pterygoplichthys
- Species: P. chrysostiktos

Binomial name
- Pterygoplichthys chrysostiktos (Birindelli, Zanata & Lima, 2007)

Synonyms
- Hypostomus chrysostiktos

Species of fish

Pterygoplichthys chrysostiktos is a species of catfish in the family Loricariidae. It is native to South America, where it occurs in the Paraguaçu River basin in Brazil. It is typically seen in blackwater portions of rivers with rocky substrates at elevations of 50 to 662 m (164 to 2,172 ft) above sea level. The species reaches 26 cm (10.2 in) SL and is believed to be a facultative air-breather.
