= Pterygoplichthys ambrosettii =

Conservation status
- Least Concern (IUCN 3.1)

Scientific classification
- Kingdom: Animalia
- Phylum: Chordata
- Class: Actinopterygii
- Division: Teleostei
- Order: Siluriformes
- Family: Loricariidae
- Genus: Pterygoplichthys
- Species: P. ambrosettii

Binomial name
- Pterygoplichthys ambrosettii Holmberg, 1893

Synonyms
- Pterygoplichthys anisitsi C. H. Eigenmann & Kennedy, 1903

Species of fish

Pterygoplichthys ambrosettii, sometimes known as the snow king pleco, is a species of armored catfish native to south-central South America.

== Distribution and habitat ==
This species is distributed in the Río Plata basin, in the Paraguay, Middle Paraná, Bermejo, and Uruguay rivers, in the countries of Paraguay, Bolivia, the north/northeast of Argentina, and the west of Uruguay. It is a typical species of the Paraná lower freshwater ecoregion.

=== Invasive tendencies ===
It was not originally present in the upper Paraná River, but due to flooding of geological barriers (Sete Quedas waterfalls) the species was able to expand their territory. This was due to the installation of the Itaipu hydroelectric power plant.

== Taxonomy ==
The species was originally described in the year 1893 by the physician, naturalist and writer Argentine Eduardo Ladislao Holmberg, under the scientific term for Liposarcus ambrosettii using samples caught in the Paraguay River, opposite the city of Formosa. It is included in the Hypostominae subfamily.

=== Etymology ===
Etymologically, the generic name Pterygoplichthys is constructed with three words of the Greek language, where: pterygion is the diminutive of pteryx that means 'fin', hoplon is 'weapon', and ichthys is 'fish'. The specific term ambrosettii honors the surname of Argentine naturalist Juan Bautista Ambrosetti.

=== Taxonomic history ===
Pterygoplichthys anisitsi was described in 1903 by the German-American ichthyologist Carl H. Eigenmann along with Clarence Hamilton Kennedy. These scientists were originally credited more so with its discovery since the description made by Holmberg went unnoticed, so in 1992 C. Weber passed the latter to the category of nomen oblitum. However, the epithet of P. ambrosettii had been cited as the valid name for this fish by Isaäc Isbrücker in 1980. Other authors began to agree, so in 2007 Carl J. Ferraris Jr. determined that, being the oldest available name, it corresponds to being the senior synonym, becoming P. anisitsi to be its minor synonym.
