= Pterygoplichthys undecimalis =

Conservation status
- Least Concern (IUCN 3.1)

Scientific classification
- Kingdom: Animalia
- Phylum: Chordata
- Class: Actinopterygii
- Division: Teleostei
- Order: Siluriformes
- Family: Loricariidae
- Genus: Pterygoplichthys
- Species: P. undecimalis

Binomial name
- Pterygoplichthys undecimalis (Steindachner, 1878)

Synonyms
- Ancistrus undecimalis; Chaetostomus undecimalis

Species of catfish

Pterygoplichthys undecimalis is a species of catfish in the family Loricariidae. It is native to South America, where it occurs in the Magdalena River basin in Colombia. Although it may be found in areas with strong current, it is believed to prefer backwaters. It feeds on detritus and periphyton found on submerged tree trunks and macrophytes. Males of the species are known to guard fertilized eggs. The species reaches 50 cm (19.7 in) in standard length and is known to be a facultative air-breather.
