= Hypostomus isbrueckeri =

Scientific classification
- Kingdom: Animalia
- Phylum: Chordata
- Class: Actinopterygii
- Order: Siluriformes
- Family: Loricariidae
- Genus: Hypostomus
- Species: H. isbrueckeri

Binomial name
- Hypostomus isbrueckeri R. E. dos Reis, C. Weber & L. R. Malabarba, 1990

Species of catfish

Hypostomus isbrueckeri is a species of catfish in the family Loricariidae. It is native to South America, where it occurs in the middle and upper Uruguay River basin. The species reaches 30.8 cm (12.1 inches) in total length, can weigh up to at least 285 g, and is believed to be a facultative air-breather.

== Etymology ==
Its specific epithet, isbrueckeri, presumably honors Isaäc J. H. Isbrücker, a Dutch ichthyologist known for his contributions to the study of loricariid catfish.
