= Pterygoplichthys lituratus =

Conservation status
- Least Concern (IUCN 3.1)

Scientific classification
- Kingdom: Animalia
- Phylum: Chordata
- Class: Actinopterygii
- Division: Teleostei
- Order: Siluriformes
- Family: Loricariidae
- Genus: Pterygoplichthys
- Species: P. lituratus

Binomial name
- Pterygoplichthys lituratus (Kner, 1854)

Synonyms
- Ancistrus lituratus; Glyptoperichthys lituratus

Species of catfish

Pterygoplichthys lituratus is a species of catfish in the family Loricariidae. It is a freshwater fish native to South America, where it occurs in the Madeira River basin in Bolivia and Brazil. The species reaches 37 cm (15 in) in standard length and is known to be a facultative air-breather.

Pterygoplichthys lituratus appears in the aquarium trade, where it is typically referred to either as the Fatamorgana pleco or by its associated L-number, which is L-196.
