= Hypostomus soniae =

Conservation status
- Least Concern (IUCN 3.1)

Scientific classification
- Kingdom: Animalia
- Phylum: Chordata
- Class: Actinopterygii
- Order: Siluriformes
- Family: Loricariidae
- Genus: Hypostomus
- Species: H. soniae

Binomial name
- Hypostomus soniae P. H. Carvalho & C. Weber, 2005

Species of fish

Hypostomus soniae is a species of catfish in the family Loricariidae. It is native to South America, where it occurs in the Tapajós basin in the state of Pará in Brazil. The species reaches 16.4 cm (6.5 in) in standard length. Its specific epithet, soniae, honors Sonia Fisch-Muller, a curator at the Museum of Geneva specializing in loricariid systematics who collected the type material.

== Etymology ==
The fish is named in honor of Sonia Fisch-Muller, of the Muséum d'histoire naturelle in Geneva, who is a specialist in loricariid systematics and one of the collectors of the type series.

== Aquarium ==
H. soniae appears in the aquarium trade, where it is typically referred to either as the blue-eyed redfin pleco or by its associated L-number, which is L-137.
