= Citripestis =

Scientific classification
- Domain: Eukaryota
- Kingdom: Animalia
- Phylum: Arthropoda
- Class: Insecta
- Order: Lepidoptera
- Family: Pyralidae
- Subfamily: Phycitinae
- Genus: Citripestis; Ragonot, 1893

Synonyms
- Philotroctis Meyrick, 1933

Genus of moths

Citripestis is a genus of snout moths. It was described by Ragonot in 1893, and is known from Java, Indonesia and Perak.

== Species ==
- Citripestis eutraphera (Meyrick, 1933)
- Citripestis sagittiferella (Moore, 1891)
