= Pterygoplichthys zuliaensis =

Conservation status
- Vulnerable (IUCN 3.1)

Scientific classification
- Kingdom: Animalia
- Phylum: Chordata
- Class: Actinopterygii
- Division: Teleostei
- Order: Siluriformes
- Family: Loricariidae
- Genus: Pterygoplichthys
- Species: P. zuliaensis

Binomial name
- Pterygoplichthys zuliaensis C. Weber, 1991

Species of catfish

Pterygoplichthys zuliaensis is a species of catfish in the family Loricariidae. It is a freshwater fish endemic to the Lake Maracaibo basin in Venezuela. It is a facultative air-breather.
