= Ancistrus minutus =

Conservation status
- Endangered (IUCN 3.1)

Scientific classification
- Kingdom: Animalia
- Phylum: Chordata
- Class: Actinopterygii
- Order: Siluriformes
- Family: Loricariidae
- Genus: Ancistrus
- Species: A. minutus

Binomial name
- Ancistrus minutus Fisch-Muller, Mazzoni & C. Weber, 2001

Species of catfish

Ancistrus minutus is a species of freshwater ray-finned fish belonging to the family Loricariidae, the suckermouth armoured catfishes, and the subfamily Hypostominae, the suckermouth catfishes. This catfish is endemic to Brazil.

== Taxonomy ==
Ancistrus minutus was first formally described in 2001 by the ichthyologists, Sonia Fisch-Muller, Rosana Mazzoni Buchas and Claude Weber, with its type locality given as the Batéias stream, a left bank tributary of the upper Tocantins River, at 13°49'S, 48°20'W, in Minaçu in the Brazilian state of Goiás. Eschmeyer's Catalog of Fishes classified the genus Ancistrus in the subfamily Hypostominae, the suckermouth catfishes, within the suckermouth armored catfish family Loricariidae. It has also been classified in the tribe Ancistrini by some authorities.

== Etymology ==
Ancistrus minutus is classified in the genus Ancistrus, a name coined by Rudolf Kner but when he proposed the genus Kner did not explain the etymology of the name. It is thought to be from the Greek ágkistron, meaning a "fish hook" or the "hook of a spindle", a reference to the hooked odontodes on the interopercular bone. The specific name, minutus, is Latin for small, one sexually mature female had a standard length of 37.2 mm (1.46 in).

== Description ==
Ancistrus minutus has a single spine and 6 or 7 soft rays in the dorsal fin and a spine and 4 soft rays in the anal fin. It has a small, broad, highly flattened bodywith a short dorsal fin and a wide mouth. There is a small area of the supraoccipital plate which is frequently depressed, slightly grainy or lacking odontodes. The exposed area of the plate on the nape is tiny or is wholly hidden by skin. The upper body and fins are brownish with many small whitish spots; the lips and belly are yellowish, with no markings. There are 7 or 8 plates along the base of the dorsal fin. This species reaches a standard length of 5.7 cm (2.2 in).

== Distribution ==
Ancistrus minutus is endemic to Brazil where it occurs in small streams in the upper River Tocantins basin in the state of Goias.

== Conservation status ==
Ancistrus minutus is known from a few very clustered localities in the upper Tocantins River basin, in the Serra da Mesa region of Goiás. Sampling has taken place in the area since this species was described in 2001, but there have been no additional records. The Serra da Mesa Hydroelectric Power Plant has flooded many of the streams which were suitable for this species, with a few remaining stretches that were not flooded. The loss of habitat from the dam plus other habitat degradation has led the International Union for Conservation of Nature to classify A. minutus as Endangered.
