= Ancistrus aguaboensis =

Conservation status
- Least Concern (IUCN 3.1)

Scientific classification
- Kingdom: Animalia
- Phylum: Chordata
- Class: Actinopterygii
- Order: Siluriformes
- Family: Loricariidae
- Genus: Ancistrus
- Species: A. aguaboensis

Binomial name
- Ancistrus aguaboensis Fisch-Muller, Mazzoni & C. Weber, 2001

Species of catfish

Ancistrus aguaboensis is a species of freshwater ray-finned fish belonging to the family Loricariidae, the suckermouth armoured catfishes, and the subfamily Hypostominae, the suckermouth catfishes. This catfish is endemic to Brazil.

== Taxonomy ==
Ancistrus aguaboensis was first formally described in 2001 by the ichthyologists Sonia Fisch-Muller, Rosana Mazzoni Buchas and Claude Weber, with its type locality given as the Agua Boa stream, a small tributary of the River Bonito, a left bank tributary of the upper Tocantins River, 10 km (6.2 mi) from Minaçu-Campinaçu, at 13°35'S, 48°14'W, in the municipality of Minaçu, in the Brazilian state of Goiás. Eschmeyer's Catalog of Fishes classified the genus Ancistrus in the subfamily Hypostominae, the suckermouth catfishes, within the suckermouth armored catfish family Loricariidae. It has also been classified in the tribe Ancistrini by some authorities.

== Etymology ==
Ancistrus aguaboensis is classified in the genus Ancistrus, a name coined by Rudolf Kner but when he proposed the genus Kner did not explain the etymology of the name. It is thought to be from the Greek ágkistron, meaning a "fish hook" or the "hook of a spindle", a reference to the hooked odontodes on the interopercular bone. The specific name, aguaboensis, suffixes -ensis, meaning "of a place", onto the name of the type locality, the Agua Boa stream.

== Description ==
Ancistrus aguaboensis has its rather short dorsal fin supported by a single spine and 7 soft rays while its anal fin also has a single spine but only 4 soft rays. This is a small species with a highly flattened, broad body and a wide mouth. A small area of the plate above the eye is frequently depressed, and is only slightly grainy or has no odontodes at all. The exposed portion of the nuchal plate is tiny or the plate is wholly covered by skin. dorsal and anal fins are brownish and are marked with many small whitish spots. The lips and abdomen are yellowish, without, or with very little, pigment. There are 6 or 7 plates in the skin along the base of the dorsal fin. It has an elongated body shape and it reaches a standard length of 6.7 cm (2.6 in).

== Distribution and habitat ==
Ancistrus aguaboensis is endemic to Brazil where it is only known to occur in streams in the upper basin of the Tocantins River in the states of Goiás and Tocantins, as well as in the Brasilia Distrito Federal. This catfish is found in streams with a rocky bottom and relatively strong current. It is a benthic fish which lives among rocks.

== Utilisation ==
Ancistrus aguaboensis sometimes appears in the aquarium trade, where it is usually either known as the Aguaboa ancistrus, the Aguaboa pleco, or by its L-number, L032.
