= Claude Weber =

Swiss ichthyologist (1946–2024)

- Born: 7 June 1946; Geneva, Switzerland
- Died: 17 August 2024 (aged 78); Thonon-les-Bains, France
- Known for: Taxonomy of Loricariidae
- Scientific career
- Fields: Ichthyology
- Workplaces: Natural History Museum of Geneva

Claude Weber (7 June 1946 – 17 August 2024) was a Swiss ichthyologist who specialized in catfish of the family Loricariidae. He worked at the Natural History Museum of Geneva from 1970 to 2008.

== Taxa described ==
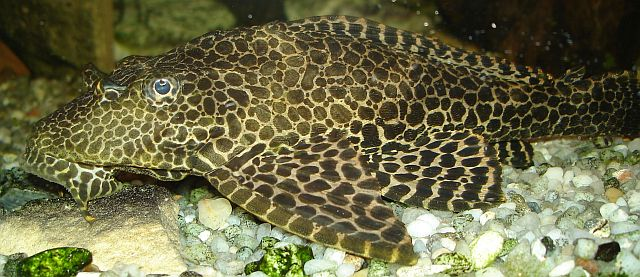
Pterygoplichthys gibbiceps (Kner, 1854), placed in the genus Glyptoperichthys by Weber in 1991.

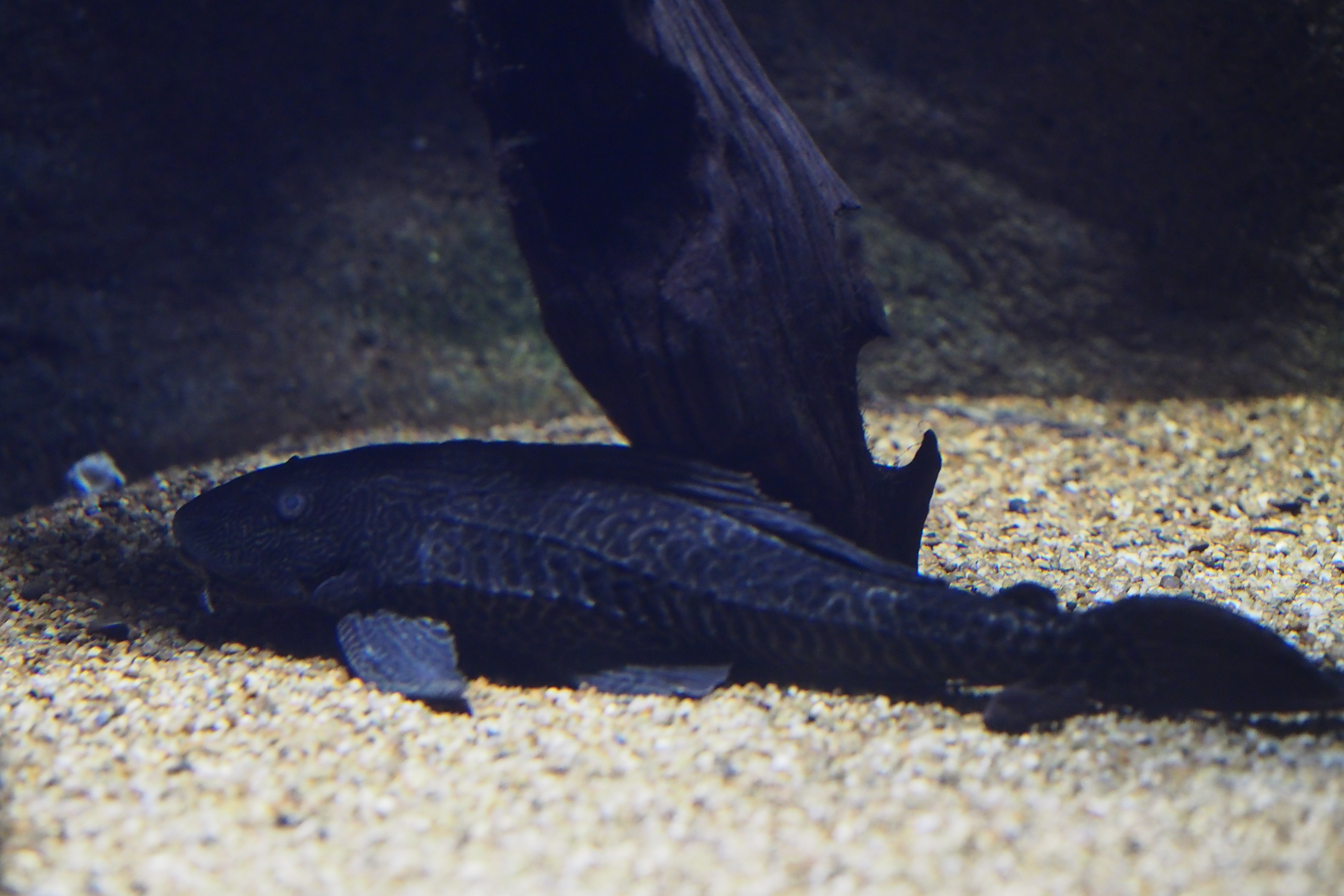
Pterygoplichthys disjunctivus (Weber, 1991), originally described as Liposarcus disjunctivus.

Weber described the genus Glyptoperichthys in 1991, as well as the following species:

- Ancistrus aguaboensis Fisch-Muller, Mazzoni & Weber, 2001
- Ancistrus minutus Fisch-Muller, Mazzoni & Weber, 2001
- Glyptoperichthys joselimaianus Weber, 1991
- Glyptoperichthys parnaibae Weber, 1991
- Glyptoperichthys xinguensis Weber, 1991
- Hypostomus denticulatus Zawadzki, Weber & Pavanelli, 2008
- Hypostomus dlouhyi Weber, 1985
- Hypostomus ericae Hollanda Carvalho & Weber, 2005
- Hypostomus fonchii Weber & Montoya-Burgos, 2002
- Hypostomus heraldoi Zawadzki, Weber & Pavanelli, 2008
- Hypostomus isbrueckeri Reis, Weber & Malabarba, 1990
- Hypostomus latifrons Weber, 1986
- Hypostomus microstomus Weber, 1987
- Hypostomus paucipunctatus Hollanda Carvalho & Weber, 2005
- Hypostomus peckoltoides Zawadzki, Weber & Pavanelli, 2010
- Hypostomus piratatu Weber, 1986
- Hypostomus roseopunctatus Reis, Weber & Malabarba, 1990
- Hypostomus simios Hollanda Carvalho & Weber, 2005
- Hypostomus soniae Hollanda Carvalho & Weber, 2005
- Hypostomus uruguayensis Reis, Weber & Malabarba, 1990
- Hypostomus waiampi Hollanda Carvalho & Weber, 2005
- Liposarcus disjunctivus Weber, 1991
- Pterygoplichthys zuliaensis Weber, 1991

The species Pterygoplichthys weberi, described by Armbruster and Page in 2006, was named in Weber's honour.
