= Citripestis eutraphera =

Scientific classification
- Domain: Eukaryota
- Kingdom: Animalia
- Phylum: Arthropoda
- Class: Insecta
- Order: Lepidoptera
- Family: Pyralidae
- Genus: Citripestis
- Species: C. eutraphera

Binomial name
- Citripestis eutraphera (Meyrick, 1933)

Synonyms
- Myelois eutraphera Meyrick, 1933

Species of moth

Citripestis eutraphera, the mango fruit borer, is a species of snout moth in the genus Citripestis. It was described by Edward Meyrick in 1933 and is known from Java, Indonesia, India and the Northern Territory of Australia.

The larvae have been recorded feeding on mangoes and cashews. They feed on pulp and cause premature fruit drop, mainly in young fruit. The larvae are reddish violet when young, but turn dark blue as they develop.
