= Hypostomus watwata =

Conservation status
- Least Concern (IUCN 3.1)

Scientific classification
- Kingdom: Animalia
- Phylum: Chordata
- Class: Actinopterygii
- Order: Siluriformes
- Family: Loricariidae
- Genus: Hypostomus
- Species: H. watwata

Binomial name
- Hypostomus watwata Hancock, 1828

Synonyms
- Plecostumus watwata; Squaliforma watwata: Hypostomus verres

Species of fish

Hypostomus watwata, commonly known as the armored catfish, is a species of catfish in the family Loricariidae. It is native to South America, where it occurs in the coastal drainages of Guyana and French Guiana, ranging from the Oyapock to the Demerara River. It is an introduced species in Hawaii.

H. watwata is typically seen in the brackish lower reaches of rivers, in muddy areas with mangrove trees such as Laguncularia racemosa, Avicennia germinans, and Rhizophora mangle. It reaches 45 cm (18 in) in standard length and is believed to be a facultative air breather. The species is known to spawn by laying eggs in excavated burrows in the mud.
