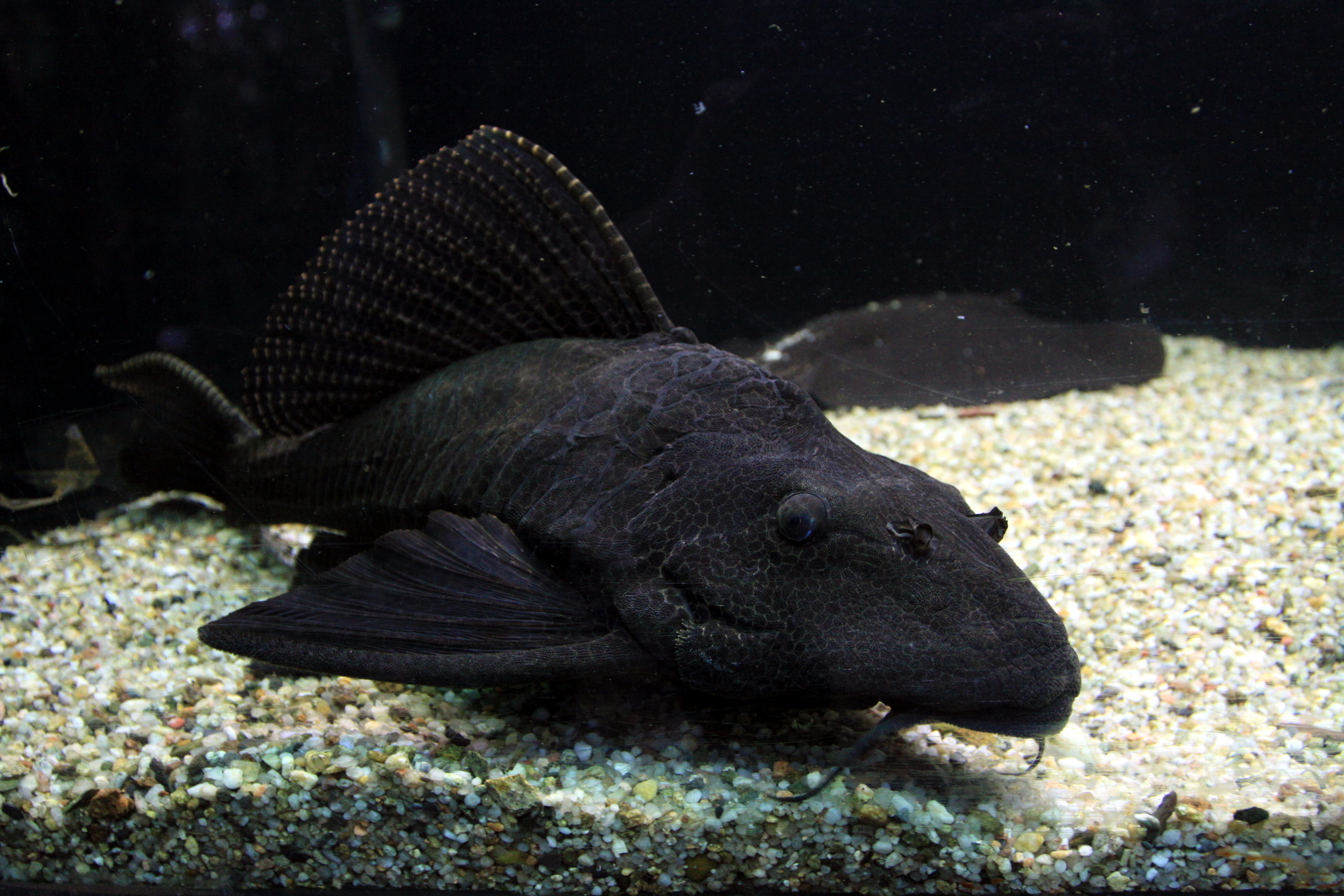

Conservation status
- Least Concern (IUCN 3.1)

Scientific classification
- Kingdom: Animalia
- Phylum: Chordata
- Class: Actinopterygii
- Division: Teleostei
- Order: Siluriformes
- Family: Loricariidae
- Subfamily: Hypostominae
- Tribe: Pterygoplichthyini
- Genus: Pterygoplichthys
- Species: P. gibbiceps

Binomial name
- Pterygoplichthys gibbiceps (Kner, 1858)

= Pterygoplichthys gibbiceps =

Species of fish

Pterygoplichthys gibbiceps is a species of armored catfish native to Brazil, Ecuador, Peru and Venezuela, where it is found in the Orinoco and Amazon basins.

Pterygoplichthys gibbiceps shows all the characteristic features of its genus—a large dorsal fin with more than nine rays, prominent nasal flares, and a prominent hump or crest anterior to the dorsal fin, as well as a substantial base to the dorsal fin. Adult fish easily attain a length of 50 centimetres (20 in) TL and can live for more than 20 years.

A typical plec shape is shown. Patternation consists of primarily irregular largish brown spots on a yellowish background giving a honeycomb-like appearance. Additional pattern features common to related species may be visible on close inspection. As this fish grows, the spots get smaller.

Like most plecs this species is primarily herbivorous, though it will eat dead animals.

In the wild these fish are found in shoals in sluggish rivers of the Amazon and Orinoco river systems. They also occupy flooded land during the wet season. During the dry season, P. gibbiceps will aestivate in burrows around 1-metre (3 ft 3 in) long dug into mud banks along the length of a river. Egg rearing is also presumed to take place in burrows.

The species name comes from the Latin gibbus—hump, and caput—head, a reference to the centrally located ridge. Common names include 'gibbys', leopard sailfin catfish and clown plecs; the juveniles have a comical appearance due to the large and obvious spots.

Ancistrus gibbiceps and Glyptoperichthys gibbiceps are synonyms of P. gibbiceps.

The fish has recently been caught from the river Ganges, Banaras, and is suspected to be yet another entrant to the invasive exotic list of fish in India.

== In the aquarium ==
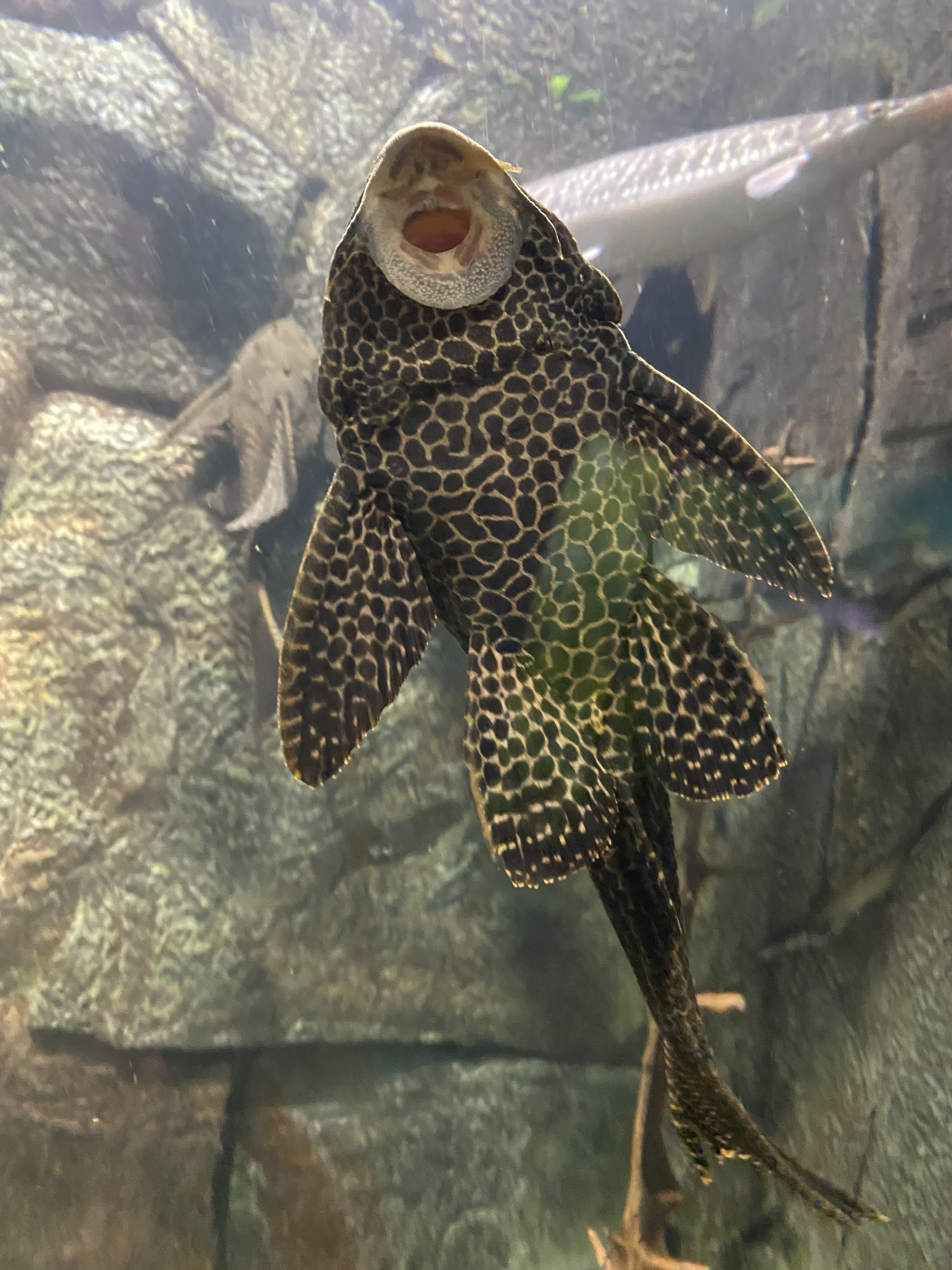
Sucking on glass

This fish is extremely popular in the aquarium, due to its unusual appearance and its ability to eat algae. This and other related species are bred in ponds in tropical regions for the aquarium trade. In general P. gibbiceps is peaceful towards other fish, though territorial disputes arise with other plecos and fish of a similar or larger size. Though not nocturnal they are more active at night and will spend daylight hours 'hiding' in a secluded location. As the fish grows big (up to 2 ft (60.96 cm) in the aquarium), a large tank with good filtration is required. In general these fish are tolerant to a wide range of freshwater conditions, though they prefer well-aerated water. The fish will 'gulp' surface air in poorly oxygenated water.

A lesser-known trait is its mild camouflage ability, where it can lighten or darken its scales in a tiger-stripe pattern. This may reflect its mood or comfort with the water parameters.

== Food ==
Pterygoplichthys gibbiceps is an omnivore. They can be fed with vegetables such as nettles, lettuce, spinach or carrots. Their diet can include meat, such as earthworms, blood worms or chopped shrimps. They will also eat prepared foods from a pet shop, especially sinking algae wafers. The best way to breed Pterygoplichthys gibbiceps is to feed them with wide spectrum of food. With a good diet, they will grow quickly (up to 30 centimetres in one year). Adult Pterygoplichthys gibbiceps may eat many aquarium plants.

== Reproduction ==
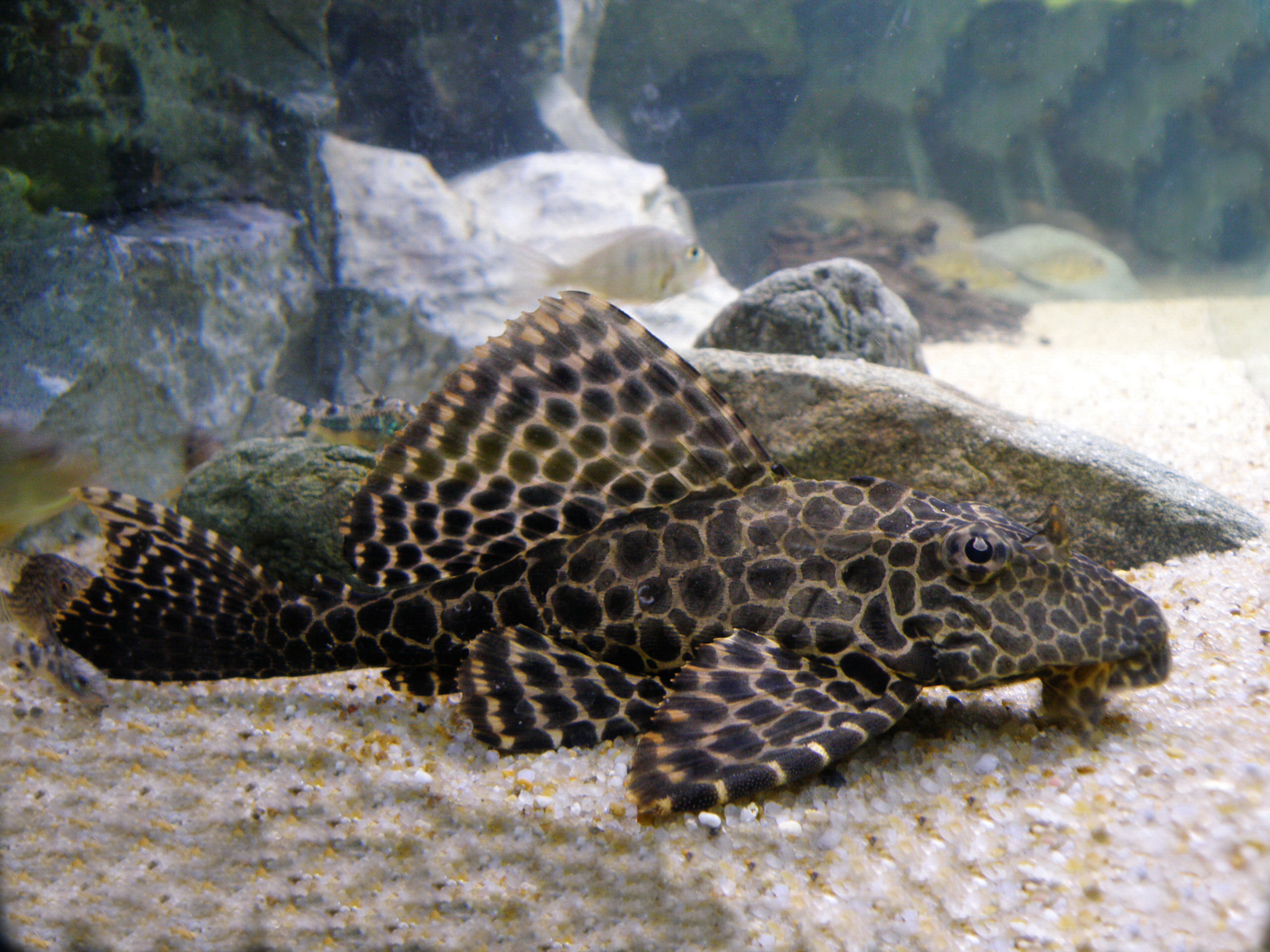
Juvenile

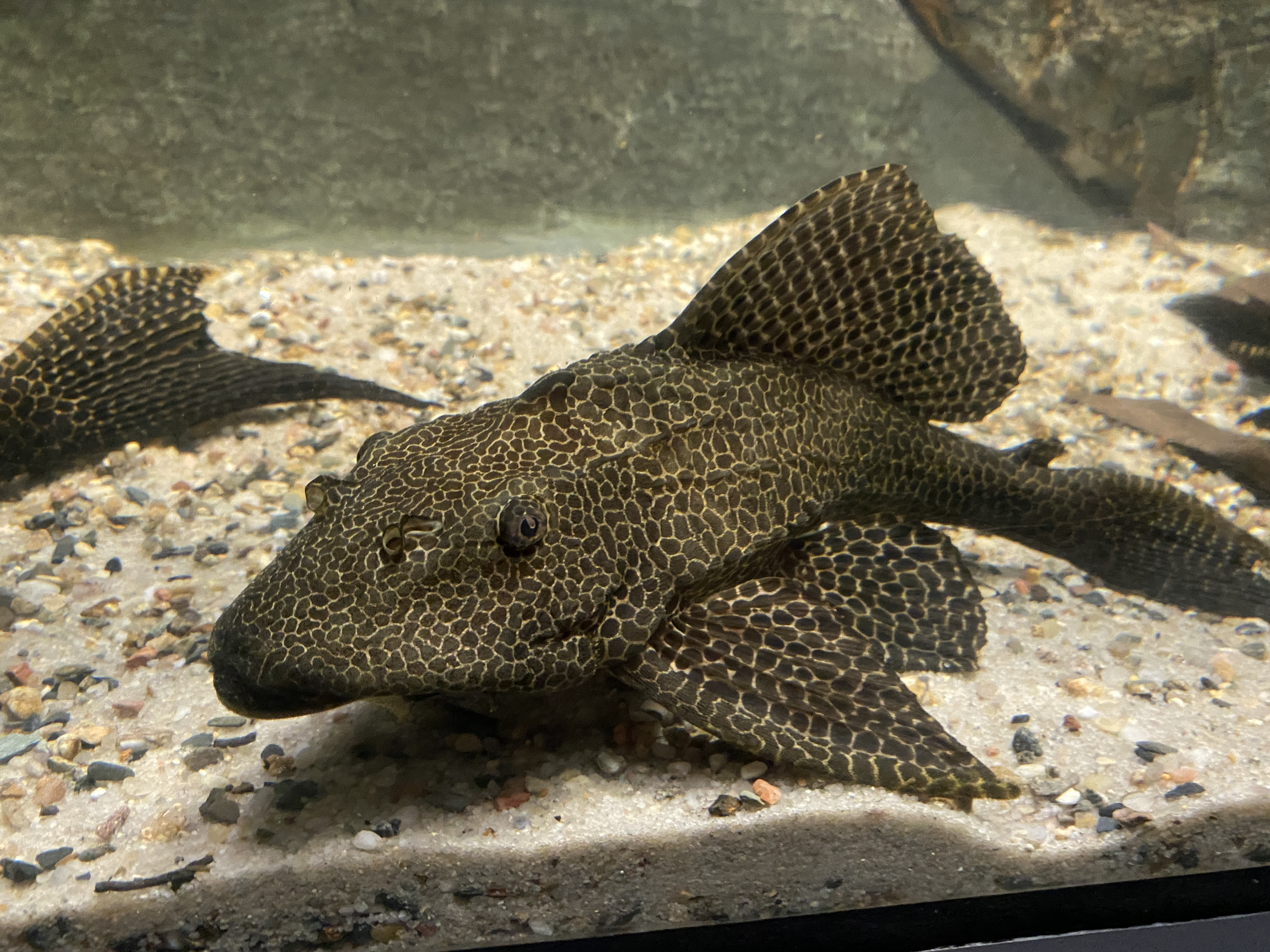
Adult

It can be almost impossible to differentiate males from females. Males in a group can be determined as they may become more territorial. Reproduction involves females laying roe in caves or hollows of roots. There is a high rate of mortality until the spawn are five centimetres (two inches) long. The reason for this is unknown.

== See also ==
- List of freshwater aquarium fish species
