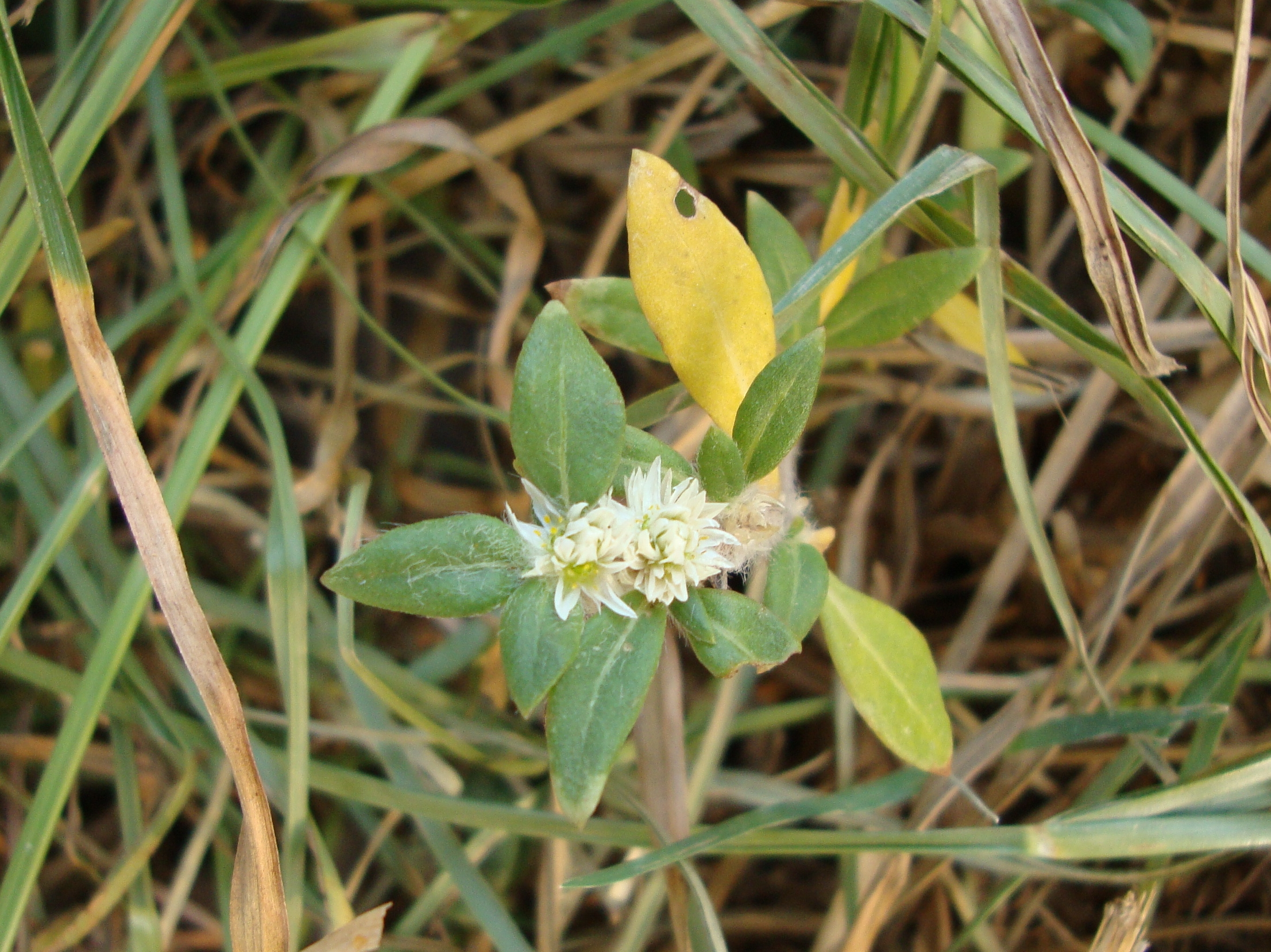

Scientific classification
- Kingdom: Plantae
- Clade: Embryophytes
- Clade: Tracheophytes
- Clade: Spermatophytes
- Clade: Angiosperms
- Clade: Eudicots
- Order: Caryophyllales
- Family: Amaranthaceae
- Genus: Alternanthera
- Species: A. paronychioides

Binomial name
- Alternanthera paronychioides A.St.-Hil.

= Alternanthera paronychioides =

Species of flowering plant

Alternanthera paronychioides is a species of flowering plant in the family Amaranthaceae.

== Description ==
The species typically grows in moist habitats such as grasslands, roadsides, and disturbed areas.

It has opposite leaves and small, inconspicuous flowers arranged in axillary clusters.
