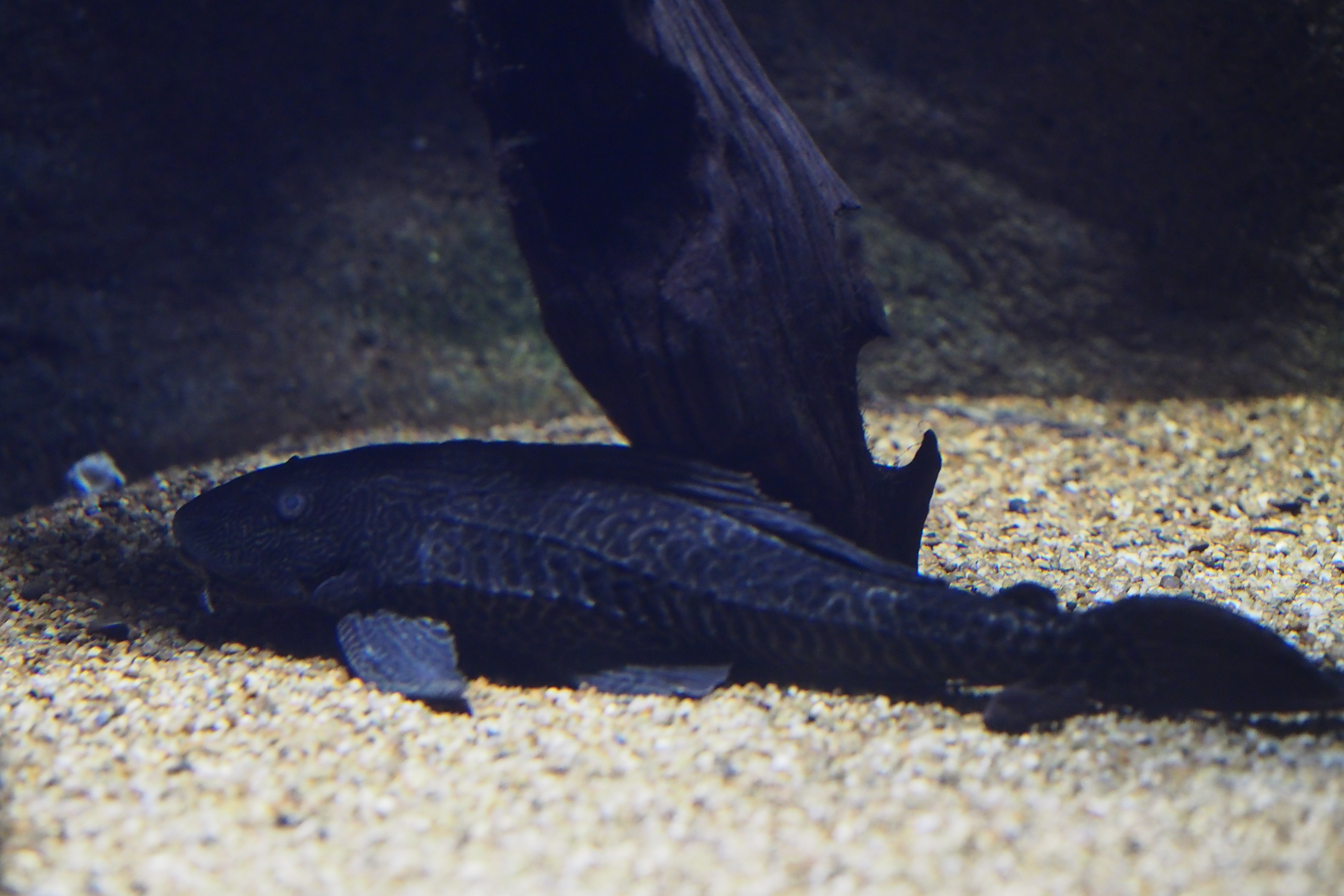

Conservation status
- Least Concern (IUCN 3.1)

Scientific classification
- Kingdom: Animalia
- Phylum: Chordata
- Class: Actinopterygii
- Division: Teleostei
- Order: Siluriformes
- Family: Loricariidae
- Genus: Pterygoplichthys
- Species: P. disjunctivus

Binomial name
- Pterygoplichthys disjunctivus (C. Weber, 1991)

Synonyms
- Liposarcus disjunctivus C. Weber, 1991

= Pterygoplichthys disjunctivus =

Species of catfish

Pterygoplichthys disjunctivus, commonly known as the vermiculated sailfin catfish, is a species of catfish in the family Loricariidae. It is native to South America, where it occurs in the Madeira River basin in Bolivia and Brazil, although it has subsequently been introduced to various countries.

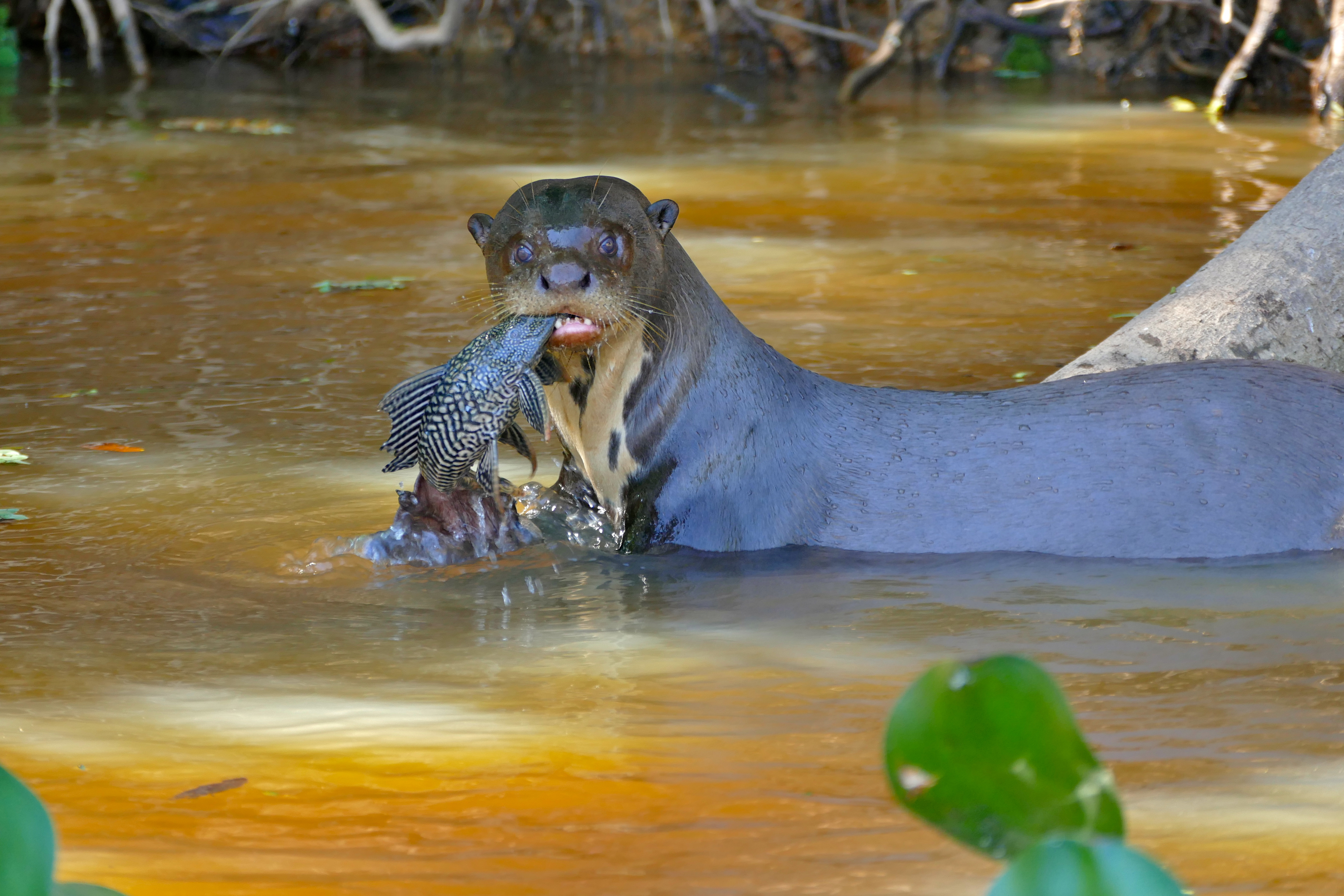
A specimen of Pterygoplichthys disjunctivus being hunted by a giant otter.

Pterygoplichthys disjunctivus is typically found in floodplain lakes, swamps, and borrow pits in water with a low concentration of oxygen. As such, it is a facultative air-breather that appears to use its specialized stomach as an accessory respiratory organ, and it is known to typically rely on breathing air for long periods of time. The species is very large for a loricariid, reaching 70 cm (28 in) in total length. It is an introduced species in India, Indonesia, Japan, Mexico, the Philippines, Puerto Rico, Singapore, Taiwan, Turkey, and the United States, and it is likely responsible for ecological and environmental damage.
