= Pterygoplichthys anisitsi =

Scientific classification
- Kingdom: Animalia
- Phylum: Chordata
- Class: Actinopterygii
- Division: Teleostei
- Order: Siluriformes
- Family: Loricariidae
- Genus: Pterygoplichthys
- Species: P. anisitsi

Binomial name
- Pterygoplichthys anisitsi C. H. Eigenmann & Kennedy, 1903

Synonyms
- Ancistrus anisitsi (Eigenmann & Kennedy, 1903); Liposarcus anisitsi (Eigenmann & Kennedy, 1903)

Species of catfish

Pterygoplichthys anisitsi also known as the Paraná sailfin catfish, southern sailfin catfish, is a species of catfish in the family Loricariidae. Its natural range is the middle Paraná and Uruguay River basins of south-central South America, but it has been introduced to North America and South Asia, probably via the pet trade. Like other loricariid catfishes, Pterygoplichthys anisitsi has a ventral mouth modified into a sucking disk and a body covered in bony plates. The species typically has a dark and white spotted body pattern, although some individuals are very dark with few spots. It reaches 55 cm (21.7 inches) in total length and can weigh up to at least 2.3 kg.

== Gas exchange and respiration ==
Pterygoplichthys anisitsi is capable of breathing both air and water. During nighttime or when the fish experiences a low-oxygen environment, it will swim to the surface to gulp in air. When breathing air, the species uses its stomach for the diffusion of oxygen into the blood.

== Etymology ==
The fish is named in honor of Juan Daniel Anisits (1856–1911), who collected the type specimen.
