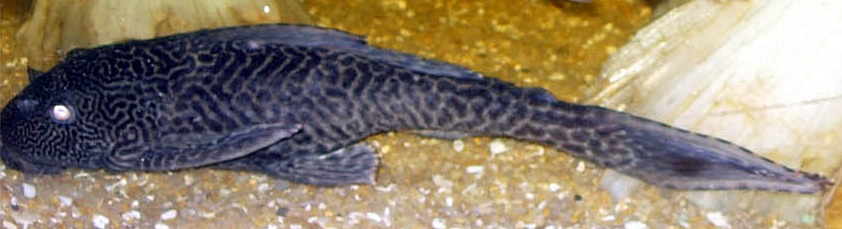

Conservation status
- Least Concern (IUCN 3.1)

Scientific classification
- Kingdom: Animalia
- Phylum: Chordata
- Class: Actinopterygii
- Order: Siluriformes
- Family: Loricariidae
- Subfamily: Hypostominae
- Tribe: Hypostomini
- Genus: Hypostomus
- Species: H. punctatus

Binomial name
- Hypostomus punctatus Valenciennes, 1840

= Hypostomus punctatus =

Species of fish

Hypostomus punctatus, the suckermouthed catfish, is a tropical fish belonging to the armored suckermouth catfish family, Loricariidae. Hypostomus punctatus is a freshwater fish native to South America, in the coastal drainages of southeastern Brazil and Uruguay. It is one of a number of species commonly referred to as "plecostomus" or "common pleco" by aquarists.

== Description ==
H. punctatus is a species of loricariid catfish. Like other members of this family, it possesses a suckermouth, armor plates, strong dorsal and pectoral fin spines, and the omega iris. This species reaches about 30 centimetres (12 in) TL.

Hypostomus punctatus is difficult to distinguish from closely related species, such as Hypostomus plecostomus. Identification is relatively difficult as there are many different similar species labelled as "common pleco". This species has a light brown coloration with a pattern of darker brown spots (its specific epithet, punctatus, means "spotted"). Because of this, the species may also be known as the spotted hypostomus. The species is not notably striped and is generally lighter in coloration than H. plecostomus.

== Habitat and ecology ==
H. punctatus is found in the wild in fast-flowing rivers as well as in flooded areas. It prefers water with a temperature of 22–28 °C (72–82 °F), a pH range of 5–8, and a dH range of 0.5–25. H. punctatus is primarily herbivorous and feeds on algae and detritus as well as plants and roots.
