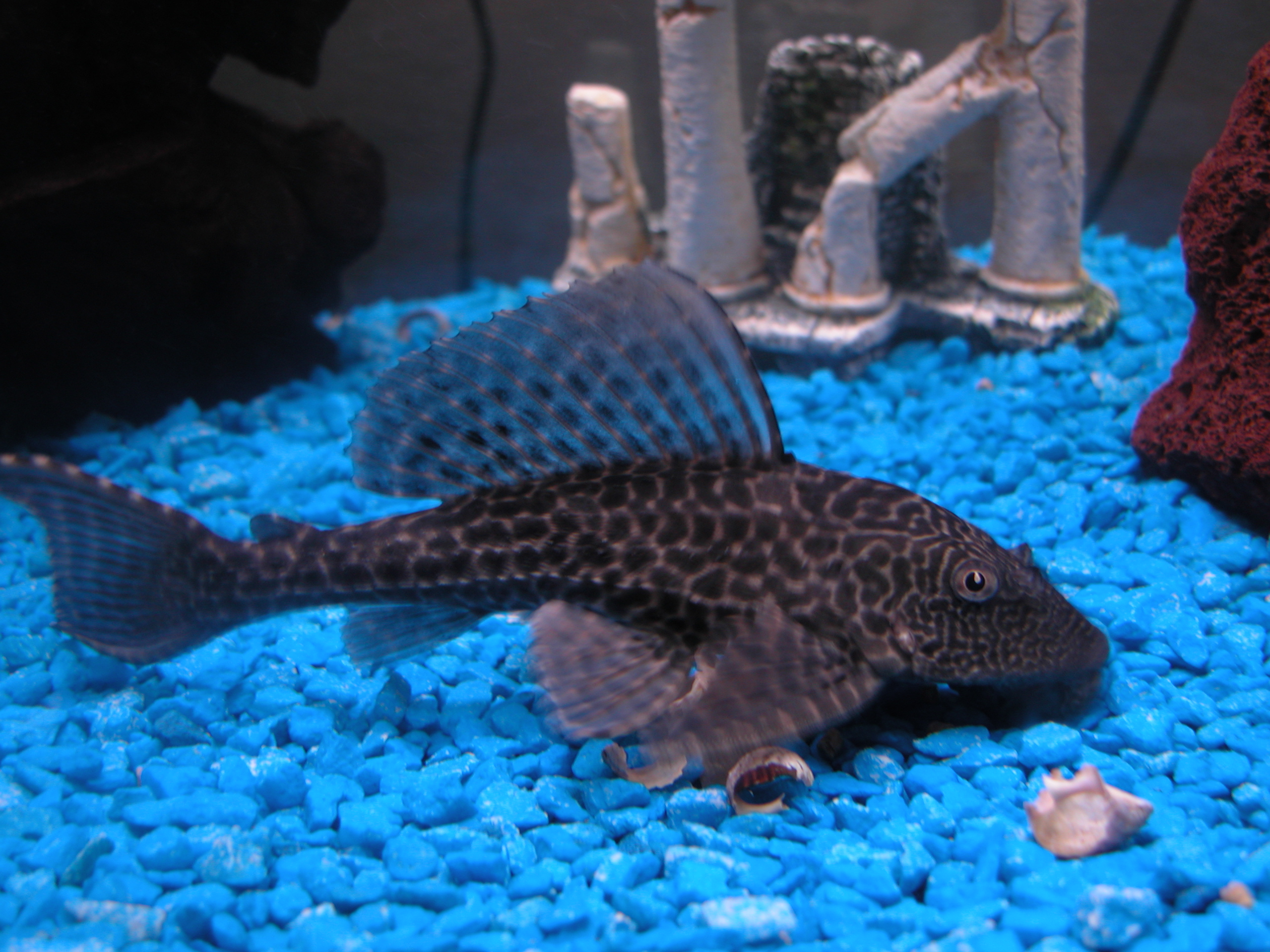

Conservation status
- Least Concern (IUCN 3.1)

Scientific classification
- Kingdom: Animalia
- Phylum: Chordata
- Class: Actinopterygii
- Division: Teleostei
- Order: Siluriformes
- Family: Loricariidae
- Subfamily: Hypostominae
- Tribe: Pterygoplichthyini
- Genus: Pterygoplichthys
- Species: P. pardalis

Binomial name
- Pterygoplichthys pardalis (Castelnau, 1855)

Synonyms
- Hypostomus pardalis Castelnau, 1855; Liposarcus pardalis Castelnau, 1855; Liposarcus varius Castelnau, 1855; Liposarcus jeanesianus Castelnau, 1855

= Pterygoplichthys pardalis =

Species of fish

Pterygoplichthys pardalis, the Amazon sailfin catfish, is a freshwater tropical fish in the armored catfish family (Loricariidae). It is one of a number of species commonly referred to as the common pleco or "leopard pleco" by aquarists.

== Description ==
This species will grow to a maximum length of 43 centimetres (17 in) SL and reach a weight of 310 g.

It is sometimes confused with the Hypostomus plecostomus (another armored catfish known as the "common plecostomus"). The two species can be distinguished by their number of dorsal rays. P. pardalis has 11–13, while the H. plecostomus has only 5–8 dorsal rays. It is also commonly misindentified as P. disjunctivus and can be differentiated by its spotted patterning.

There is an albino color variation of this species, usually referred to as an "Albino Plecostomus". The amelanistic form may also be sold as the "chocolate pleco".

== Distribution and habitat ==
The species is native to the Amazon River Basin of Brazil and Peru, preferring pH ranges of 7.0–7.5. It is a facultative air breather; although normally a bottom-dwelling fish, it has the ability to breathe air from the surface of the water during dry periods or when dissolved oxygen is too low. The Amazon sailfin catfish has been introduced to a number of countries outside its native range. It is recorded in the Marikina River in the Philippines and known as the "janitor fish", where it has become a local pest and sold in bulk, in efforts to eliminate the fish. In the United States, invasive populations of sailfin catfishes like the Amazon sailfin catfish have been observed to be ecologically detrimental, as they disrupt aquatic food chains, decrease the abundance of native aquatic species, and degrade aquatic plants or banks of waterbodies through burrowing and tunneling.

== Invasive species ==
In Malaysia, the fish was brought into the country in the 1970s for fish hobbyists. It is believed that they are dumped into Malaysian rivers and lakes by aquarium owners when it is too big for their fish tanks.

== See also ==
- List of freshwater aquarium fish species
