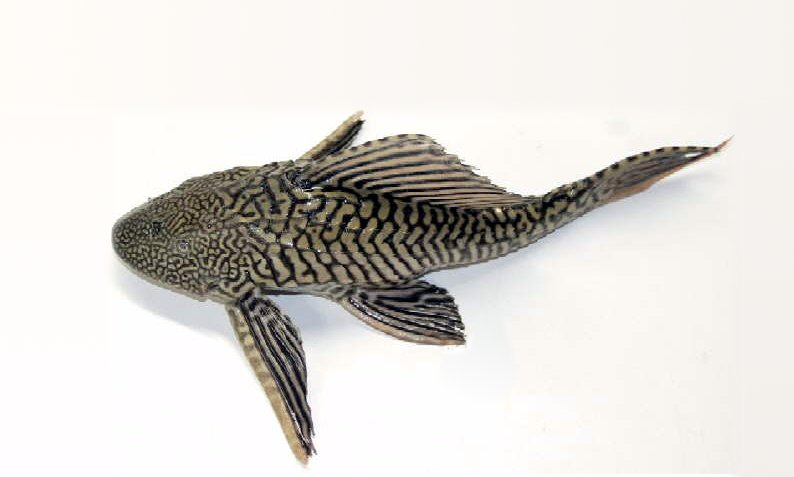
- Pterygoplichthys sp.

Scientific classification
- Kingdom: Animalia
- Phylum: Chordata
- Class: Actinopterygii
- Order: Siluriformes
- Family: Loricariidae
- Subfamily: Hypostominae
- Tribe: Pterygoplichthyini; Armbruster, 2004

Genera
- Pterygoplichthys

= Pterygoplichthyini =

Tribe of fishes

Pterygoplichthyini is a tribe of catfishes (order Siluriformes) of the family Loricariidae. It includes two genera, Pterygoplichthys and the currently undescribed genus referred to as the Hemiancistrus annectens group, This group was earlier misspelled as Pterygoplichthini. Pterygoplichthyines are known from nearly the entire range of loricariids except for the Guyanas and coastal streams in southeastern Brazil. although later work by the same authority, and his co-authors, placed this group among the genus Hypostomus.

Pterygoplichthyini is sister to the tribe Ancistrini, which shares the derived presence of an evertible patch of plates on the cheek.

Pterygoplichthys and the H. annectens group differ most obviously in the number of dorsal fin rays (7 in the H. annectens group and 9+ in Pterygoplichthys). The two genera are supported as sisters by only one derived characteristic: a modified stomach that is attached to the abdominal wall by a net of connective tissue.

This modified stomach allows these fish to breathe air. The stomach is vascularized. A white net of connective tissue surrounds the organ, leaving a circular area in the middle of the stomach free; this connective tissue firmly holds the stomach to the body wall and is better developed in adults. It may also function as a hydrostatic organ, allowing the fish to remain buoyant midwater.
