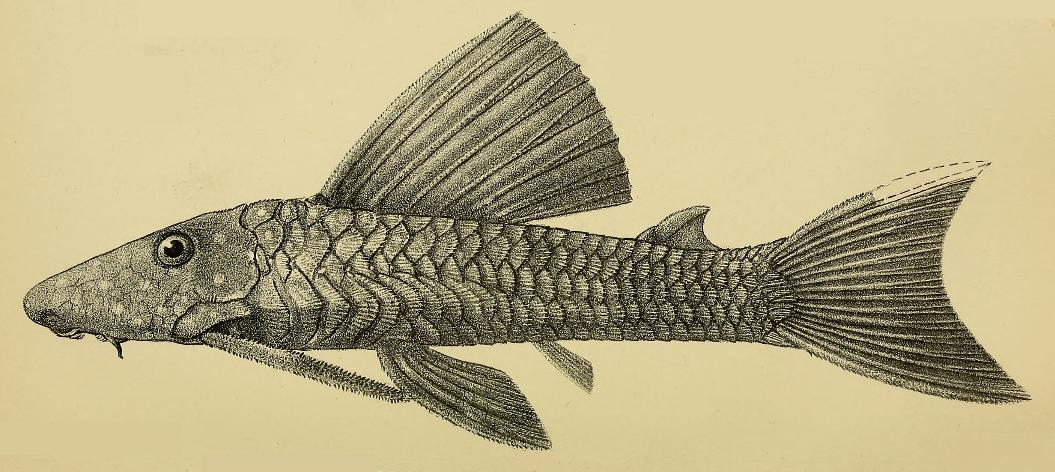

Scientific classification
- Domain: Eukaryota
- Kingdom: Animalia
- Phylum: Chordata
- Class: Actinopterygii
- Order: Siluriformes
- Family: Loricariidae
- Genus: Hypostomus
- Species: H. margaritifer

Binomial name
- Hypostomus margaritifer (Regan, 1908)

Synonyms
- Plecostomus margaritifer; Plecostomus margaritifer butantanis; Hypostomus butantanis

= Hypostomus margaritifer =

Species of catfish

Hypostomus margaritifer is a species of catfish in the family Loricariidae. It is native to South America, where it occurs in the upper and middle Paraná River basin. The species reaches 33 cm (13 in) in total length and is believed to be a facultative air-breather. It is known to be syntopic with other loricariid species in the genus Hypostomus, including Hypostomus ancistroides, H. denticulatus, H. heraldoi, H. iheringii, and H. regani.

Hypostomus margaritifer appears in the aquarium trade, where it is typically referred to as the yellow-spotted hypostomus.
