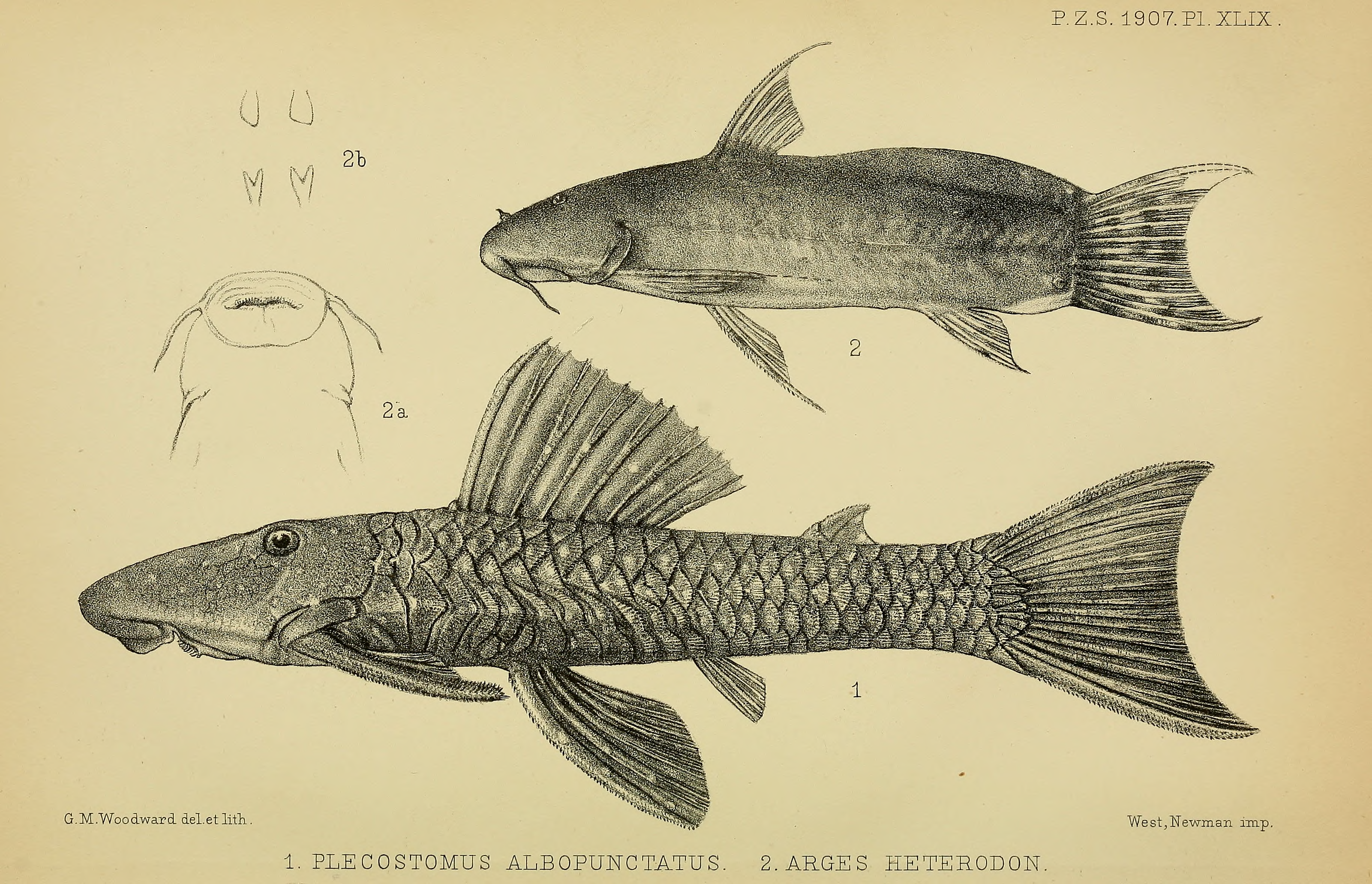
- Hypostomus albopunctatus (lower).

Conservation status
- Least Concern (IUCN 3.1)

Scientific classification
- Kingdom: Animalia
- Phylum: Chordata
- Class: Actinopterygii
- Division: Teleostei
- Order: Siluriformes
- Family: Loricariidae
- Genus: Hypostomus
- Species: H. albopunctatus

Binomial name
- Hypostomus albopunctatus (Regan, 1908)

Synonyms
- Plecostomus albopunctatus Regan, 1908; Plecostomus lexi Ihering, 1911; Hypostomus lexi (Ihering, 1911); Plecostomus scaphyceps Nichols, 1919; Hypostomus scaphyceps (Nichols, 1919); Plecostomus niger Marini, Nichols & LaMonte, 1933; Hypostomus niger (Marini, Nichols & LaMonte 1933)

= Hypostomus albopunctatus =

Species of catfish

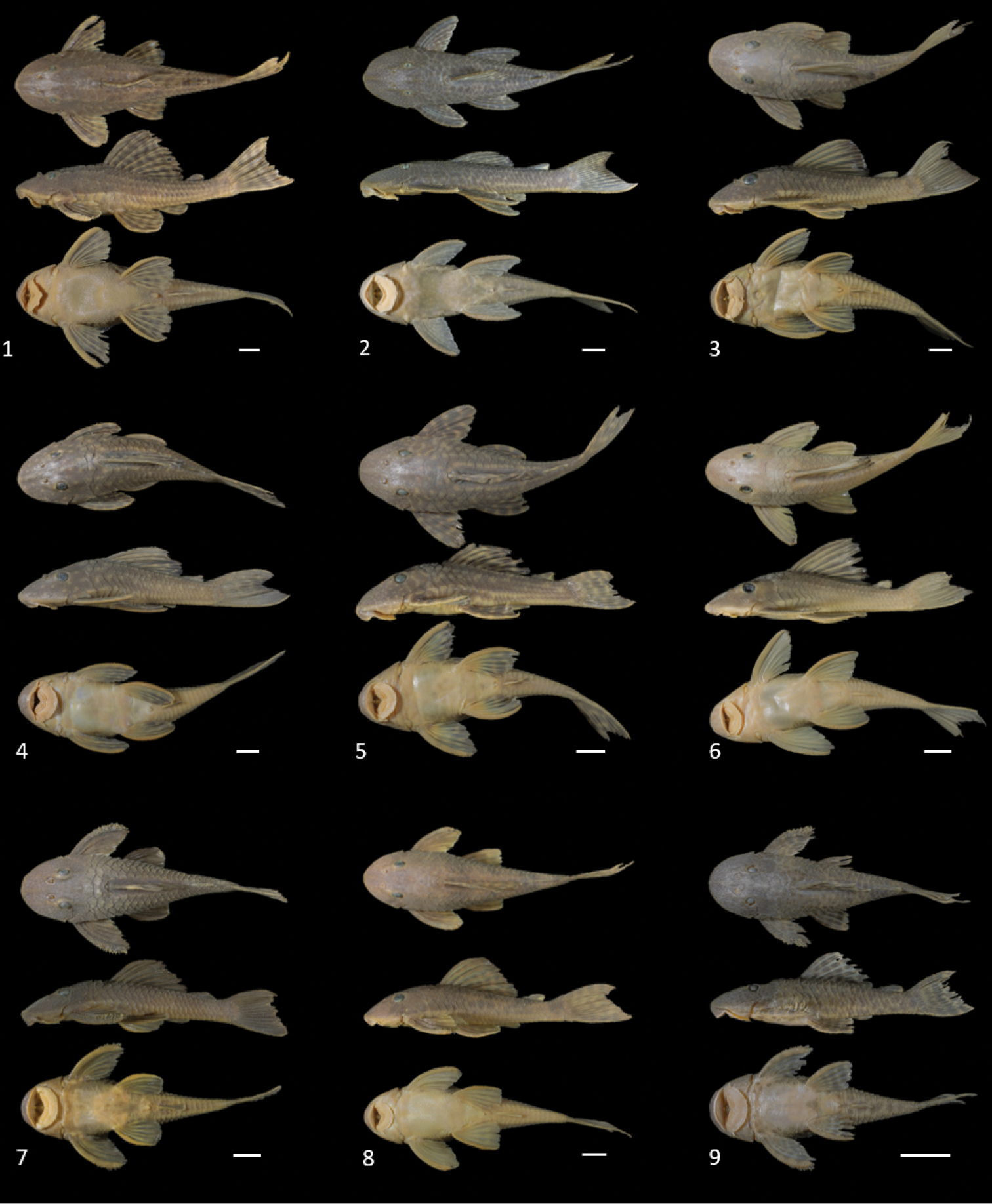
The loricariid labeled with the number 2 in this image is a specimen of H. albopunctatus.

Hypostomus albopunctatus is a species of freshwater ray-finned fish belonging to the family Loricariidae, the suckermouth armored catfishes, and the subfamily Hypostominae, the suckermouth catfishes. This catfish occurs in the basins of the Paraná River and the Iguazu River, in Argentina, Brazil and Paraguay. The species reaches a standard length of 40 cm (16 in), can weigh up to at least 991 g (35.0 oz), and is believed to be a facultative air-breather. While similar to the related species Hypostomus heraldoi, H. albopunctatus can be distinguished by its distinctive pale spots and the length of its fin rays. The specific name, albopunctatus, refers to these white spots.
