= Hypostomus denticulatus =

Scientific classification
- Kingdom: Animalia
- Phylum: Chordata
- Class: Actinopterygii
- Order: Siluriformes
- Family: Loricariidae
- Genus: Hypostomus
- Species: H. denticulatus

Binomial name
- Hypostomus denticulatus Zawadzki, Weber & Pavanelli, 2008

Species of catfish

Hypostomus denticulatus is a species of catfish in the family Loricariidae. It is native to South America, where it occurs in the Corumbá River in the Paraná River basin in Brazil. It is typically found in turbid waters with a substrate composed of rocks with some amount of sand. It is known to be syntopic with other loricariid species in the genus Hypostomus, including Hypostomus ancistroides, H. heraldoi, H. iheringii, H. margaritifer, and H. regani. The species reaches 19.1 cm (7.5 inches) in standard length and is believed to be a facultative air-breather.

Hypostomus denticulatus was described in 2008 by Cláudio H. Zawadzki (of the State University of Maringá), Claude Weber, and C. S. Pavanelli (also of the State University of Maringá), alongside the aforementioned related and syntopic species H. heraldoi.
