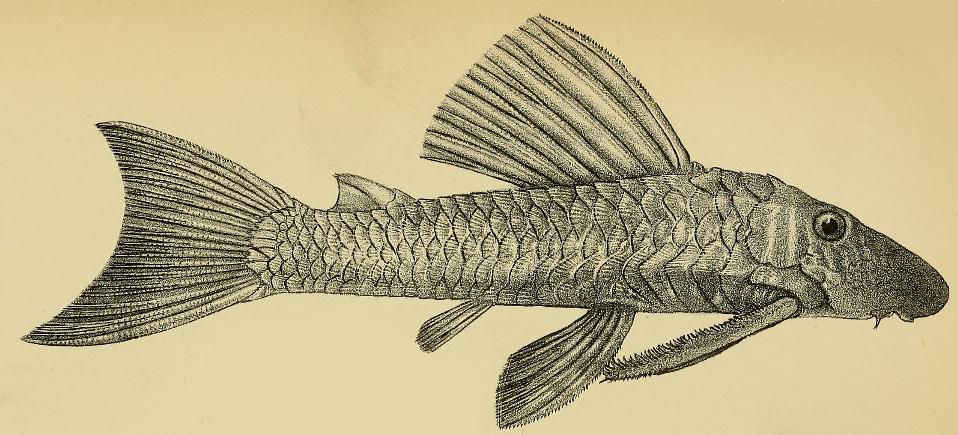

Scientific classification
- Domain: Eukaryota
- Kingdom: Animalia
- Phylum: Chordata
- Class: Actinopterygii
- Order: Siluriformes
- Family: Loricariidae
- Genus: Hypostomus
- Species: H. iheringii

Binomial name
- Hypostomus iheringii (Regan, 1908)

Synonyms
- Plecostomus iheringii

= Hypostomus iheringii =

Species of catfish

Hypostomus iheringii is a species of catfish in the family Loricariidae. It is native to South America, where it is occurs in the Paraná River drainage basin, being known from the Tietê River basin as well as the Corumbá River, where it is syntopic with Hypostomus ancistroides, H. denticulatus, H. heraldoi, H. margaritifer, and H. regani. The species reaches 11.6 cm (4.6 inches) in standard length and is believed to be a facultative air-breather.

== Etymology ==
The fish is named in honor of Rodolpho von Ihering (1883–1939), a Brazilian zoologist and fish culturist, who collected the holotype.
