= Hypostomus lexi =

Scientific classification
- Kingdom: Animalia
- Phylum: Chordata
- Class: Actinopterygii
- Order: Siluriformes
- Family: Loricariidae
- Genus: Hypostomus
- Species: H. lexi

Binomial name
- Hypostomus lexi (Ihering, 1911)

Synonyms
- Plecostomus lexi

Species of fish

Hypostomus lexi is a species of catfish in the family Loricariidae. It is native to South America, where it occurs in the Grande River basin in Brazil. The species is large for a loricariid, reaching 46 cm (18.1 inches) SL, and it is believed to be a facultative air-breather.
