= Hypostomus heraldoi =

Scientific classification
- Kingdom: Animalia
- Phylum: Chordata
- Class: Actinopterygii
- Order: Siluriformes
- Family: Loricariidae
- Genus: Hypostomus
- Species: H. heraldoi

Binomial name
- Hypostomus heraldoi Zawadzki, C. Weber & Pavanelli, 2008

Species of catfish

Hypostomus heraldoi is a species of catfish in the family Loricariidae. It is native to South America, where it occurs in the Corumbá River and Rio Grande basins in the upper Paraná River drainage in Brazil. It is typically found in turbid waters with a substrate composed of rocks with some amount of sand. It is known to be syntopic with other loricariid species in the genus Hypostomus, including Hypostomus ancistroides, H. denticulatus, H. iheringii, H. margaritifer, and H. regani. The species reaches 23.6 cm (9.3 inches) in standard length and is believed to be a facultative air-breather.

Hypostomus heraldoi was described in 2008 by Cláudio H. Zawadzki (of the State University of Maringá), Claude Weber, and C. S. Pavanelli (also of the State University of Maringá), alongside the aforementioned related and syntopic species H. denticulatus.

== Etymology ==
The fish is named in honor of Brazilian ichthyologist Heraldo A. Britski, of the Universidade de São Paulo.
