= Ormetica pallidinervis =

Scientific classification
- Domain: Eukaryota
- Kingdom: Animalia
- Phylum: Arthropoda
- Class: Insecta
- Order: Lepidoptera
- Superfamily: Noctuoidea
- Family: Erebidae
- Subfamily: Arctiinae
- Genus: Ormetica
- Species: O. pallidinervis

Binomial name
- Ormetica pallidinervis (Rothschild, 1935)

Synonyms
- Automolis pallidinervis Rothschild, 1935

Species of moth

Ormetica pallidinervis is a moth of the family Erebidae. It was described by Walter Rothschild in 1935. It is found in the Brazilian state of Santa Catarina.
