= Ormetica chrysomelas =

Scientific classification
- Kingdom: Animalia
- Phylum: Arthropoda
- Class: Insecta
- Order: Lepidoptera
- Superfamily: Noctuoidea
- Family: Erebidae
- Subfamily: Arctiinae
- Genus: Ormetica
- Species: O. chrysomelas

Binomial name
- Ormetica chrysomelas (Walker, 1856)

Synonyms
- Automolis chrysomelas Walker, 1856; Eucyrta geometrica Felder, 1874

Species of moth

Ormetica chrysomelas is a moth of the family Erebidae. It was described by Francis Walker in 1856. It is found in French Guiana and Brazil.
