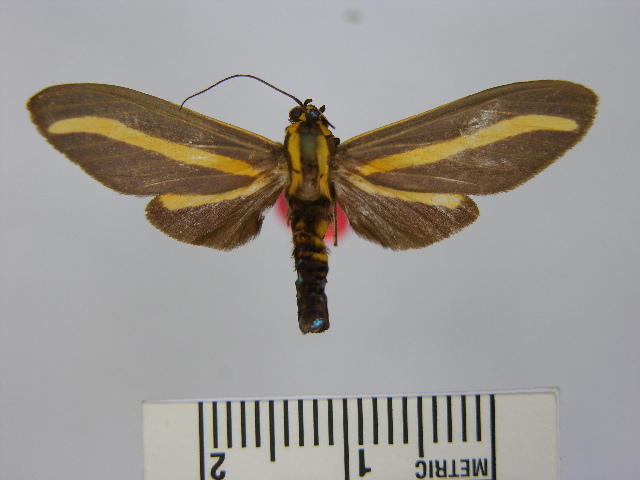

Scientific classification
- Domain: Eukaryota
- Kingdom: Animalia
- Phylum: Arthropoda
- Class: Insecta
- Order: Lepidoptera
- Superfamily: Noctuoidea
- Family: Erebidae
- Subfamily: Arctiinae
- Genus: Ormetica
- Species: O. rosenbergi

Binomial name
- Ormetica rosenbergi (Rothschild, 1909)

Synonyms
- Automolis rosenbergi Rothschild, 1909

= Ormetica rosenbergi =

Species of moth

Ormetica rosenbergi is a moth of the family Erebidae. It was described by Walter Rothschild in 1909. It is found in Ecuador.
