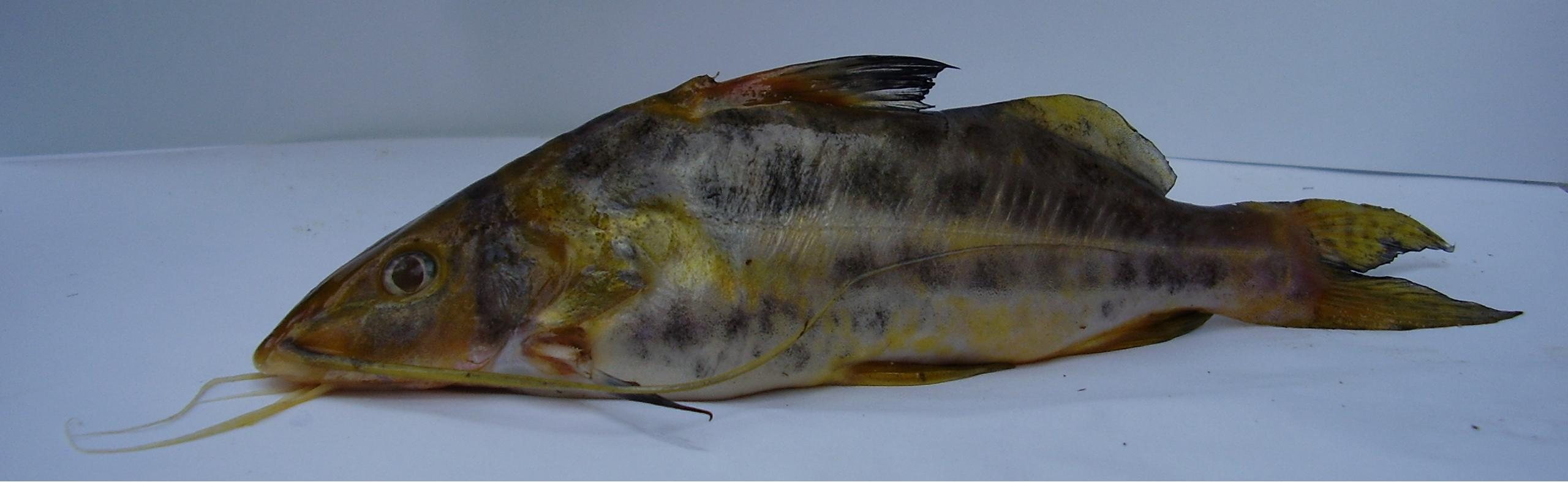
- Iheringichthys labrosus from Rio Uruguay

Scientific classification
- Domain: Eukaryota
- Kingdom: Animalia
- Phylum: Chordata
- Class: Actinopterygii
- Order: Siluriformes
- Family: Pimelodidae
- Genus: Iheringichthys
- Species: I. labrosus

Binomial name
- Iheringichthys labrosus (Lütken, 1874)

Synonyms
- Pimelodus labrosus Lütken, 1874

= Iheringichthys labrosus =

Species of fish

Iheringichthys labrosus is a species of long-whiskered catfish native to the Paraná River basin and Uruguay River basin in Argentina, Brazil, Paraguay and Uruguay. This species grows to a length of 29.7 centimetres (11.7 in) TL.
