= Ormetica rothschildi =

Scientific classification
- Domain: Eukaryota
- Kingdom: Animalia
- Phylum: Arthropoda
- Class: Insecta
- Order: Lepidoptera
- Superfamily: Noctuoidea
- Family: Erebidae
- Subfamily: Arctiinae
- Genus: Ormetica
- Species: O. rothschildi

Binomial name
- Ormetica rothschildi Watson, 1975

Synonyms
- Automolis packardi saturata Rothschild, 1909 (preocc. Walker, 1856)

Species of moth

Ormetica rothschildi is a moth of the family Erebidae. It was described by Watson in 1975. It is found in Brazil.
