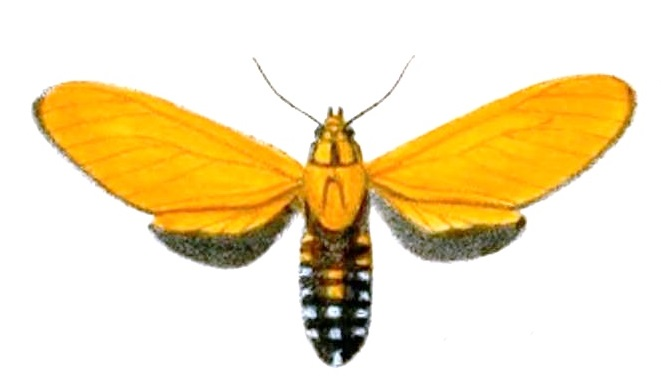

Scientific classification
- Kingdom: Animalia
- Phylum: Arthropoda
- Class: Insecta
- Order: Lepidoptera
- Superfamily: Noctuoidea
- Family: Erebidae
- Subfamily: Arctiinae
- Genus: Ormetica
- Species: O. latania

Binomial name
- Ormetica latania (H. Druce, 1890)

Synonyms
- Automolis latania H. Druce, 1890; Automolis vulcanica Seitz, 1921

= Ormetica latania =

Species of moth

Ormetica latania is a moth of the family Erebidae. It was described by Herbert Druce in 1890.

== Distribution ==
It is found in Colombia, Venezuela and Costa Rica.

== Subspecies ==
- Ormetica latania latania (Colombia)
- Ormetica latania vulcanica (Seitz, 1921) (Costa Rica)
