= Ormetica xanthia =

Scientific classification
- Kingdom: Animalia
- Phylum: Arthropoda
- Class: Insecta
- Order: Lepidoptera
- Superfamily: Noctuoidea
- Family: Erebidae
- Subfamily: Arctiinae
- Genus: Ormetica
- Species: O. xanthia

Binomial name
- Ormetica xanthia (Hampson, 1901)

Synonyms
- Idalus xanthia Hampson, 1901; Automolis luteola Rothschild, 1909

Species of moth

Ormetica xanthia is a moth of the family Erebidae. It was described by George Hampson in 1901. It is found in Venezuela and Mexico.
