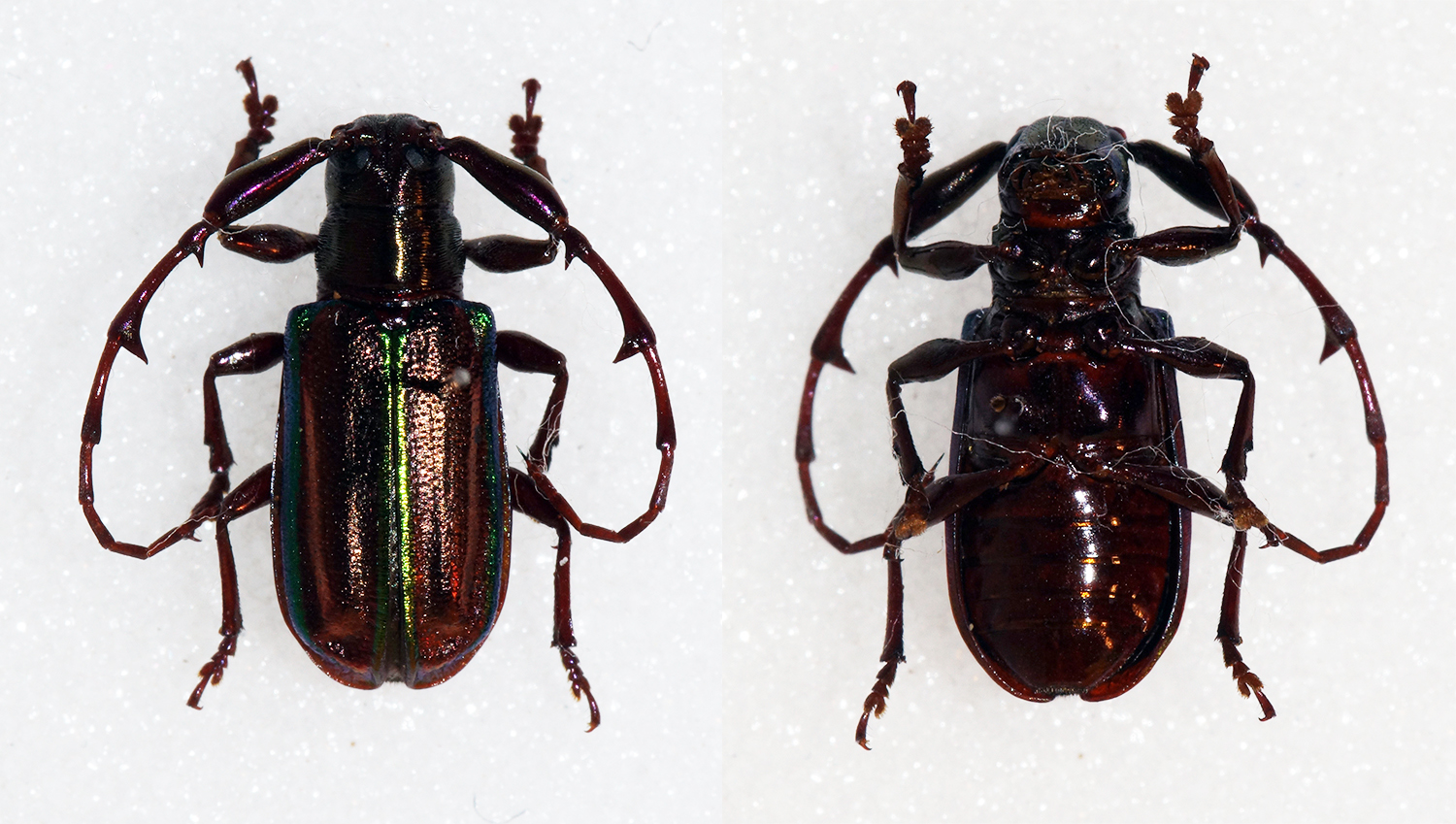

Scientific classification
- Kingdom: Animalia
- Phylum: Arthropoda
- Class: Insecta
- Order: Coleoptera
- Suborder: Polyphaga
- Infraorder: Cucujiformia
- Family: Cerambycidae
- Genus: Hoplistocerus
- Species: H. refulgens

Binomial name
- Hoplistocerus refulgens Blanchard in Orbigny, 1847

= Hoplistocerus refulgens =

Species of beetle

Hoplistocerus refulgens is a species of beetle in the family Cerambycidae. It was described by Blanchard in 1847.
