= Iheringichthys syi =

Scientific classification
- Domain: Eukaryota
- Kingdom: Animalia
- Phylum: Chordata
- Class: Actinopterygii
- Order: Siluriformes
- Family: Pimelodidae
- Genus: Iheringichthys
- Species: I. syi

Binomial name
- Iheringichthys syi Azpelicueta & Britski, 2012

Species of fish

Iheringichthys syi, is a species of demersal catfish of the family Pimelodidae that is native to Upper Rio Paraná in Brazil.

== Description ==
It grows to a length of 22.0 cm.
