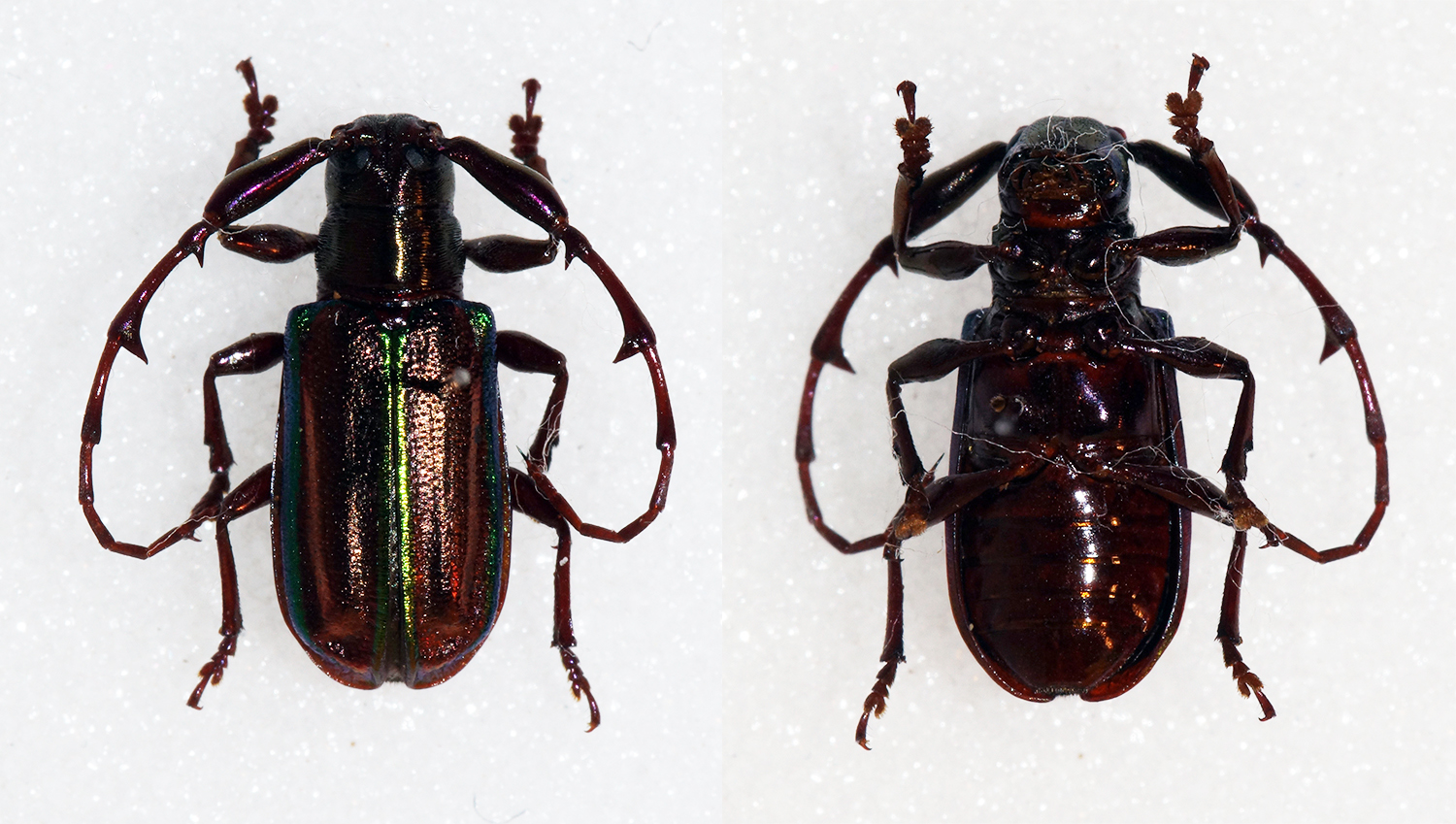
- Hoplistocerus refulgens

Scientific classification
- Kingdom: Animalia
- Phylum: Arthropoda
- Class: Insecta
- Order: Coleoptera
- Suborder: Polyphaga
- Infraorder: Cucujiformia
- Family: Cerambycidae
- Subfamily: Lamiinae
- Tribe: Anisocerini
- Genus: Hoplistocerus; Blanchard, 1846

Type species
- Hoplistocerus refulgens Blanchard, 1846

= Hoplistocerus =

Genus of beetles

Hoplistocerus is a genus of beetles in the family Cerambycidae, containing the following species:

- Hoplistocerus bonsae Lane, 1966
- Hoplistocerus callioides Gounelle, 1906
- Hoplistocerus dichrous Gounelle, 1906
- Hoplistocerus dives Bates, 1875
- Hoplistocerus gemmatus Bates, 1874
- Hoplistocerus iheringi Gounelle, 1906
- Hoplistocerus lanei Zajciw, 1960
- Hoplistocerus prominulosus Lane, 1950
- Hoplistocerus purpureoviridis Lane, 1938
- Hoplistocerus refulgens Blanchard in Orbigny, 1847
