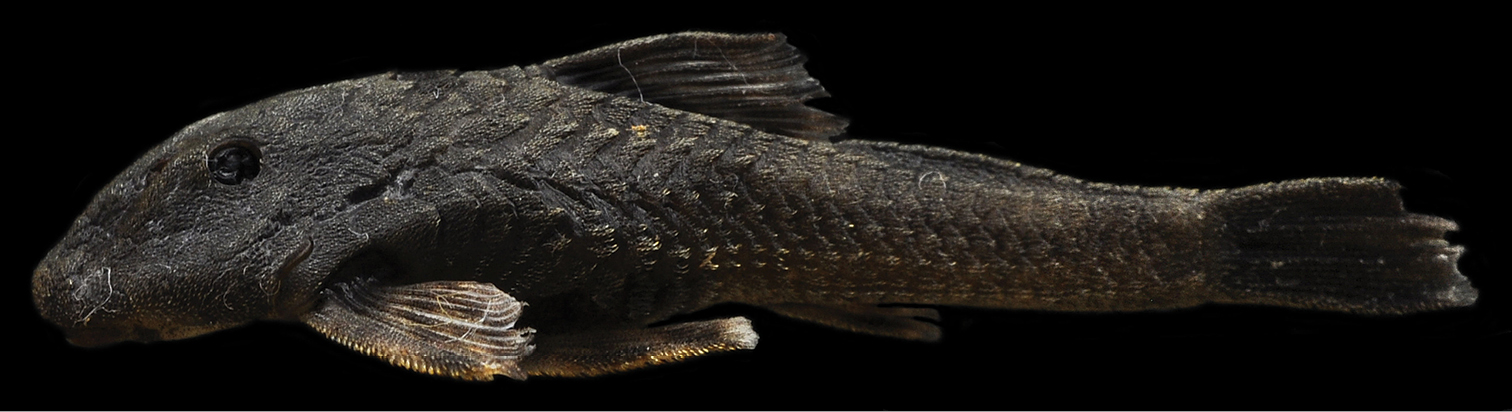

Conservation status
- Least Concern (IUCN 3.1)

Scientific classification
- Kingdom: Animalia
- Phylum: Chordata
- Class: Actinopterygii
- Division: Teleostei
- Order: Siluriformes
- Family: Loricariidae
- Genus: Pareiorhina
- Species: P. hyptiorhachis

Binomial name
- Pareiorhina hyptiorhachis G. S. C. Silva, Roxo & Oliveira, 2013

= Pareiorhina hyptiorhachis =

Species of catfish

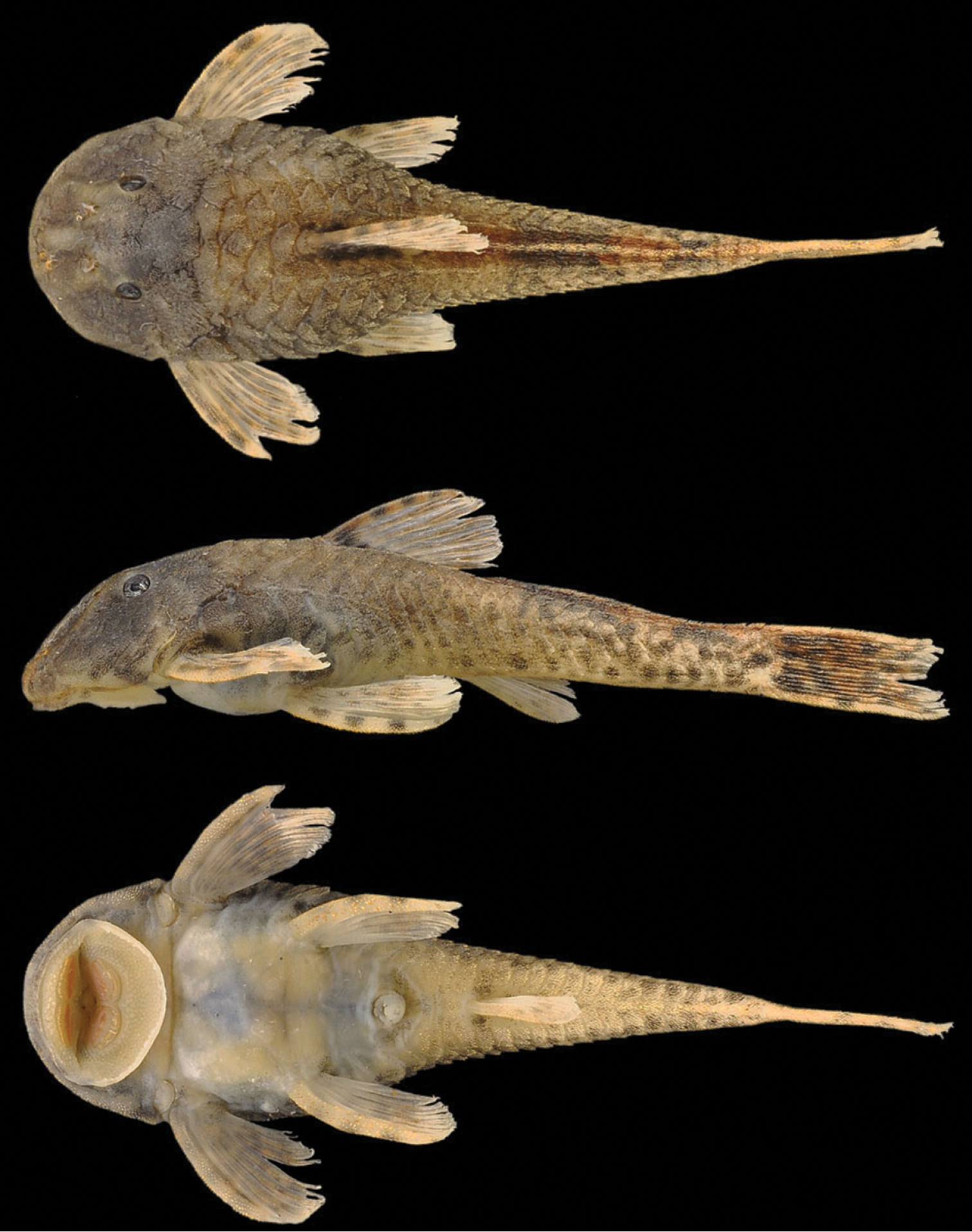
Dorsal, lateral, and ventral views of the holotype of Pareiorhina hyptiorhachis.

Pareiorhina hyptiorhachisis a species of freshwater ray-finned fish belonging to the family Loricariidae, the suckermouth armoured catfishes, and the subfamily Hypoptopomatinae, the cascudinhos. This catfish is endemic to Brazil.

== Taxonomy ==
Pareiorhina hyptiorhachis was first formally described in 2013 by the Brazilian ichthyologists Gabriel de Souza da Costa e Silva, Fábio Fernandes Roxo and Cluadio de Oliveira with its type locality given as the Fernandes Stream, a tributary of the Pomba River, part of the Paraíba do Sul basin at 21°14'47"S, 43°34'07"W in Santa Bárbara do Tugúrioin the Brazilian state of Minas Gerais. Eschmeyer's Catalog of Fishes classifies the genus Pareiorhina in the subfamily Hypoptopomatinae, the cascudinhos, within the suckermouth armored catfish family Loricariidae.

== Etymology ==
Pareiorhina hyptiorhachis is classified within the genus ''Pareiorhina, this name combines pareiá, meaning "cheek", with rhina, from rhínē, which means "file" or "rasp", this is probably an allusion to the rough sides of the head. The specific name, hyptiorhachis, is a combination of hýptios, meaning "supine", with rháchis, which means "ridge" or "midrib", an allusion to the conspicuous postdorsal ridge.

== Description ==
Pareiorhina hyptiorhachis has 9 soft rays in the dorsal fin and 6 in the anal fin and it reaches a standard length of 3.9 cm (1.5 in). This species can be told apart from all other species in its genus by its higher post dorsal ridge.

== Distribution and habitat ==
Pareiorhina hyptiorhachis is endemic to Brazil, where it is known only from the Pomba River and one of its tributaries, the Fernandes stream, in Santa Bárbara do Tugúrio in Minas Gerais. It is typically found in small streams with moderate to fast flow, margins covered in aquatic vegetation, and a substrate composed of rocks and sand. It is known to occur alongside the species Geophagus brasiliensis and Neoplecostomus microps, as well as members of the genera Astyanax, Characidium, Harttia, Imparfinis, and Trichomycterus.
