= Ormetica albimaculifera =

Scientific classification
- Kingdom: Animalia
- Phylum: Arthropoda
- Class: Insecta
- Order: Lepidoptera
- Superfamily: Noctuoidea
- Family: Erebidae
- Subfamily: Arctiinae
- Genus: Ormetica
- Species: O. albimaculifera

Binomial name
- Ormetica albimaculifera (Hampson, 1901)

Synonyms
- Automolis albimaculifera Hampson, 1901

Species of moth

Ormetica albimaculifera is a moth of the family Erebidae. It was described by George Hampson in 1901. It is found in the Amazon region.
