= Ormetica bonora =

Scientific classification
- Domain: Eukaryota
- Kingdom: Animalia
- Phylum: Arthropoda
- Class: Insecta
- Order: Lepidoptera
- Superfamily: Noctuoidea
- Family: Erebidae
- Subfamily: Arctiinae
- Genus: Ormetica
- Species: O. bonora

Binomial name
- Ormetica bonora (Schaus, 1905)

Synonyms
- Automolis bonora Schaus, 1905; Automolis ochreomarginata Joicey & Talbot, 1918; Ormetica ochreomarginata Watson, 1975

Species of moth

Ormetica bonora is a moth of the family Erebidae. It was described by William Schaus in 1905. It is found in French Guiana, Brazil, Bolivia and Costa Rica.
