= Ormetica pallidifascia =

Scientific classification
- Domain: Eukaryota
- Kingdom: Animalia
- Phylum: Arthropoda
- Class: Insecta
- Order: Lepidoptera
- Superfamily: Noctuoidea
- Family: Erebidae
- Subfamily: Arctiinae
- Genus: Ormetica
- Species: O. pallidifascia

Binomial name
- Ormetica pallidifascia (Rothschild, 1933)

Synonyms
- Automolis pallidifascia Rothschild, 1933; Automolis interrupta Reich, 1938

Species of moth

Ormetica pallidifascia is a moth of the family Erebidae. It was described by Walter Rothschild in 1933. It is found in Brazil.
