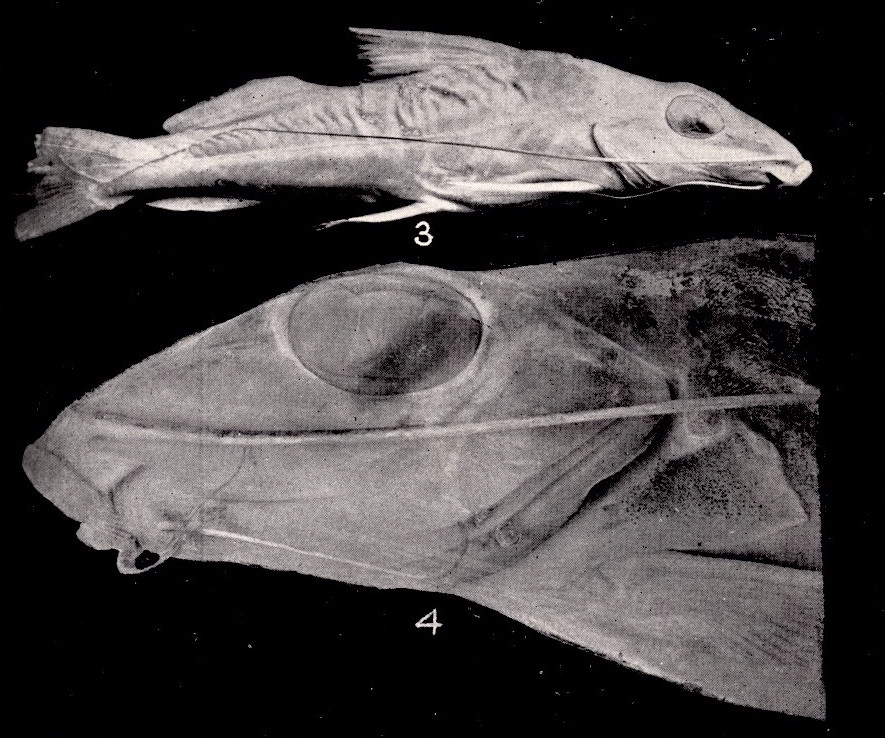

Scientific classification
- Kingdom: Animalia
- Phylum: Chordata
- Class: Actinopterygii
- Order: Siluriformes
- Family: Pimelodidae
- Genus: Iheringichthys
- Species: I. megalops

Binomial name
- Iheringichthys megalops Eigenmann & Ward, 1907

= Iheringichthys megalops =

Species of fish

Iheringichthys megalops, is a species of demersal catfish of the family Pimelodidae that is endemic to the Paraná River basin in Paraguay.
