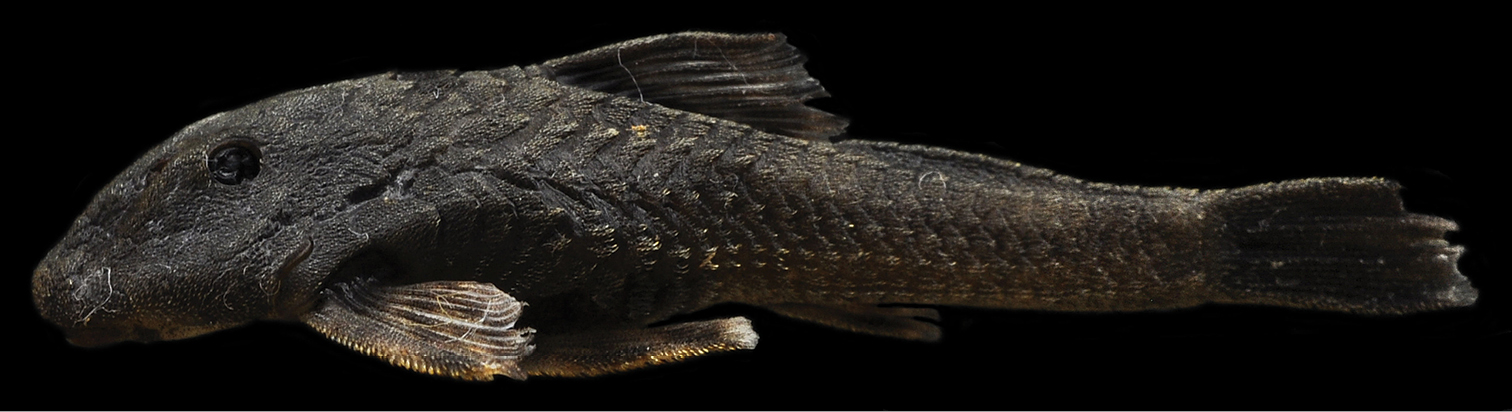
- Pareiorhina hyptiorhachis

Scientific classification
- Kingdom: Animalia
- Phylum: Chordata
- Class: Actinopterygii
- Order: Siluriformes
- Family: Loricariidae
- Subfamily: Hypoptopomatinae
- Genus: Pareiorhina; Gosline, 1947

Type species
- Rhinelepis rudolphi A. Miranda-Ribeiro, 1911

= Pareiorhina =

Genus of fishes

Pareiorhina is a genus of freshwater ray-finned fishes belonging to the family Loricariidae, the suckermouth armored catfishes, and the subfamily Hypoptopomatinae, the cascudinhos. The catfishes in this genus are found in South America.

== Taxonomy ==
Pareiorhina was first erected by Gosline in 1947 as a monotypic genus to include Rhinelepis rudolphi. It was not until 2003 that a second species, P. carrancas, was described. The third species, P. brachyrhyncha was described in 2005. Pareiorhina forms a monophyletic subunit with Neoplecostomus which some authotrities place within the subfamily Neoplecostominae, but which Eschmeyer's Catalog of Fishes classifies this genus in the subfamily Hypoptopomatinae, the cascudinhos, within the suckermouth armored catfish family Loricariidae.

== Species ==
Pareiorhina contains the following valid species:

- Pareiorhina aiuruoca Uzeda, Katz, Ottoni, W. J. E. M. Costa, Langeani & Azevedo-Santos, 2026
- Pareiorhina brachyrhyncha Chamon, Aranda & Buckup, 2005
- Pareiorhina carrancas Bockmann & A. C. Ribeiro, 2003
- Pareiorhina cepta Roxo, G. S. C. Silva, Mehanna & Oliveira, 2012
- Pareiorhina hyptiorhachis G. S. C. Silva, Roxo & Oliveira, 2013
- Pareiorhina isabelae Azevedo-Santos, Uzeda, Katz, Costa, Langeani & Ottoni, 2026
- Pareiorhina mystica Uzeda, Katz, Ottoni, Costa, Langeani & Azevedo-Santos, 2026
- Pareiorhina pelicicei Azevedo-Santos & Roxo, 2015
- Pareiorhina rosai Silva, Roxo & Oyakawa, 2016
- Pareiorhina rudolphi (A. Miranda-Ribeiro, 1911)
- Pareiorhina sofiae Azevedo-Santos, Uzeda, Katz, Costa, Langeani & Ottoni, 2026

== Distribution ==
Pareiorhina catfishes are restricted to Brazil where they are known to occur at altitudes above 650 metres (2100 ft) in various rivers of the Grande, Paraíba do Sul, São Francisco and Tietê River basins.

== Description ==
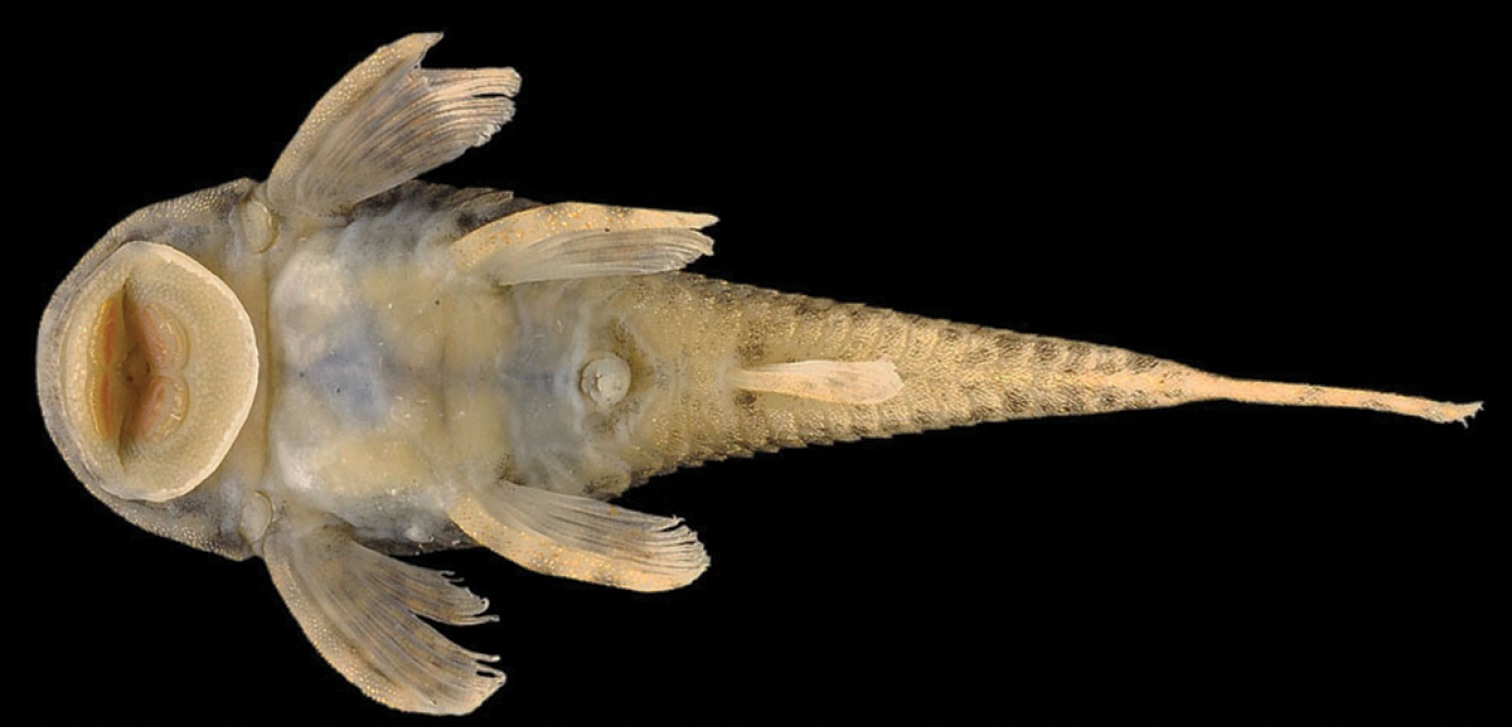
Underside of a specimen of Pareiorhina hyptiorhachis.

Pareiorhina species all have lateral borders of the head without developed bristles, a naked abdomen, dorsal plates meeting along the mid-dorsal line between the dorsal and caudal fins, no adipose fin, ventral plates covering the midventral line, and the dorsal portion of body behind dorsal fin flatenned (flat caudal peduncle with a rectangular cross section). In P. carrancas and P. rudolphi, the teeth are simple, while in P. brachyrhyncha, the teeth have a minute lateral cusp at the base of the main cusp. P. brachyrhyncha and P. carrancas are unique in lacking an adipose fin and azygous plates; in loricariids without an adipose fin, it is usually replaced by a series of azygous plates that form a ridge. However, these two species lack both the fin and the ridge. These species range from about 4.1–4.5 centimetres (1.6–1.8 in) in length.
