= Ormetica zenzeroides =

Scientific classification
- Domain: Eukaryota
- Kingdom: Animalia
- Phylum: Arthropoda
- Class: Insecta
- Order: Lepidoptera
- Superfamily: Noctuoidea
- Family: Erebidae
- Subfamily: Arctiinae
- Genus: Ormetica
- Species: O. zenzeroides

Binomial name
- Ormetica zenzeroides (Butler, 1877)

Synonyms
- Automolis zenzeroides Butler, 1877

Species of moth

Ormetica zenzeroides is a moth of the family Erebidae. It was described by Arthur Gardiner Butler in 1877. It is found in French Guiana, Brazil, Ecuador, Bolivia and Panama.
