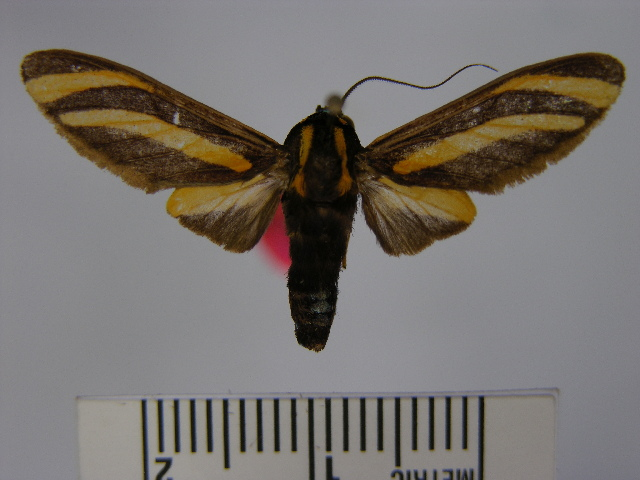

Scientific classification
- Domain: Eukaryota
- Kingdom: Animalia
- Phylum: Arthropoda
- Class: Insecta
- Order: Lepidoptera
- Superfamily: Noctuoidea
- Family: Erebidae
- Subfamily: Arctiinae
- Genus: Ormetica
- Species: O. packardi

Binomial name
- Ormetica packardi (Butler, 1876)

Synonyms
- Automolis packardi Butler, 1876

= Ormetica packardi =

Species of moth

Ormetica packardi is a moth of the family Erebidae. It was described by Arthur Gardiner Butler in 1876. It is found in French Guiana, Suriname, Brazil, Ecuador and Peru.
