= Hoplistocerus callioides =

Scientific classification
- Domain: Eukaryota
- Kingdom: Animalia
- Phylum: Arthropoda
- Class: Insecta
- Order: Coleoptera
- Suborder: Polyphaga
- Infraorder: Cucujiformia
- Family: Cerambycidae
- Genus: Hoplistocerus
- Species: H. callioides

Binomial name
- Hoplistocerus callioides Gounelle, 1906

Species of beetle

Hoplistocerus callioides is a species of beetle in the family Cerambycidae. It was described by Gounelle in 1906.
