= Pareiorhina rosai =

Conservation status
- Near Threatened (IUCN 3.1)

Scientific classification
- Kingdom: Animalia
- Phylum: Chordata
- Class: Actinopterygii
- Order: Siluriformes
- Family: Loricariidae
- Genus: Pareiorhina
- Species: P. rosai

Binomial name
- Pareiorhina rosai G. S. C. Silva, Roxo & Oyakawa, 2016

Species of catfish

Pareiorhina rosai is a species of freshwater ray-finned fish belonging to the family Loricariidae, the suckermouth armoured catfishes, and the subfamily Hypoptopomatinae, the cascudinhos. This catfish is endemic to Brazil.

== Taxonomy ==
Pareiorhina rosai was first formally described in 2016 by the Brazilian ichthyologists Gabriel de Souza da Costa e Silva, Fábio Fernandes Roxo and Osvaldo Takeshi Oyakawa with its type locality given as an unknown river, a tributary of the Maranhão River, in the catchment of the Paraopeba River, São Francisco River basin at 20°26'39.6"S 43°53'24.5"W in the municipality of Congonhas in the Brazilian state of Minas Gerais. Eschmeyer's Catalog of Fishes classifies the genus Pareiorhina in the subfamily Hypoptopomatinae, the cascudinhos, within the suckermouth armored catfish family Loricariidae.

== Etymology ==
Pareiorhina rosai is classified within the genus ''Pareiorhina, this name combines pareiá, meaning "cheek", with rhina, from rhínē, which means "file" or "rasp", this is probably an allusion to the rough sides of the head. The specific name honours the Brazilian writer João Guimarães Rosa, who wrote about the history of the people who lived around the Das Velhas and Paraopeba rivers in the Sertão savannah of Minas Gerais, the region in which this species occurs.

== Description ==
Pareiorhina rosai reaches a standard length of 5.1 cm (2.0 in) and has a maximum published weight of 3 g (0.11 oz).

== Distribution and habitat ==
Pareiorhina rosai is endemic to Brazil, where, when it was described, it was known only from 4 unnamed streams in the São Francisco River basin in Minas Gerais, one tributary of the Maranhão River, one a tributary of the Paraopeba River and two which are tributaries of the Das Velhas River. It has since been recorded in the Serra da Canastra National Park and elsewhere in the São Francisco River basin. This species is found in fast flowing streams where there is a rocky and sandy substrate.

== Conservation status ==
Pareiorhina rosai occurs in a relatively small area where its habitat is threatened by agriculture, water abstraction, mining and urbanisation. The International Union for Conservation of Nature has classified this catfish as Near Threatened.
