= Ormetica orbona =

Scientific classification
- Domain: Eukaryota
- Kingdom: Animalia
- Phylum: Arthropoda
- Class: Insecta
- Order: Lepidoptera
- Superfamily: Noctuoidea
- Family: Erebidae
- Subfamily: Arctiinae
- Genus: Ormetica
- Species: O. orbona

Binomial name
- Ormetica orbona (Schaus, 1889)

Synonyms
- Automolis orbona Schaus, 1889

Species of moth

Ormetica orbona is a moth of the family Erebidae. It was described by William Schaus in 1889. It is found in Mexico.
