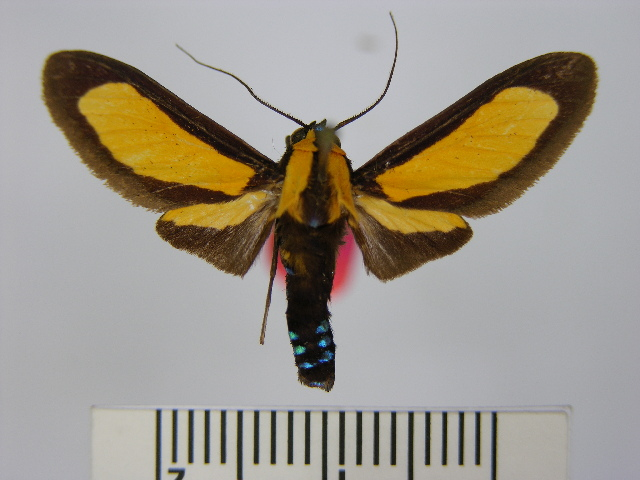

Scientific classification
- Domain: Eukaryota
- Kingdom: Animalia
- Phylum: Arthropoda
- Class: Insecta
- Order: Lepidoptera
- Superfamily: Noctuoidea
- Family: Erebidae
- Subfamily: Arctiinae
- Genus: Ormetica
- Species: O. pratti

Binomial name
- Ormetica pratti (H. Druce, 1900)

Synonyms
- Automolis pratti H. Druce, 1900

= Ormetica pratti =

Species of moth

Ormetica pratti is a moth of the family Erebidae. It was described by Herbert Druce in 1900. It is found in Colombia.
