= Hoplistocerus purpureoviridis =

Scientific classification
- Domain: Eukaryota
- Kingdom: Animalia
- Phylum: Arthropoda
- Class: Insecta
- Order: Coleoptera
- Suborder: Polyphaga
- Infraorder: Cucujiformia
- Family: Cerambycidae
- Genus: Hoplistocerus
- Species: H. purpureoviridis

Binomial name
- Hoplistocerus purpureoviridis Lane, 1938

Species of beetle

Hoplistocerus purpureoviridis is a species of beetle in the family Cerambycidae. It was described by Lane in 1938.
