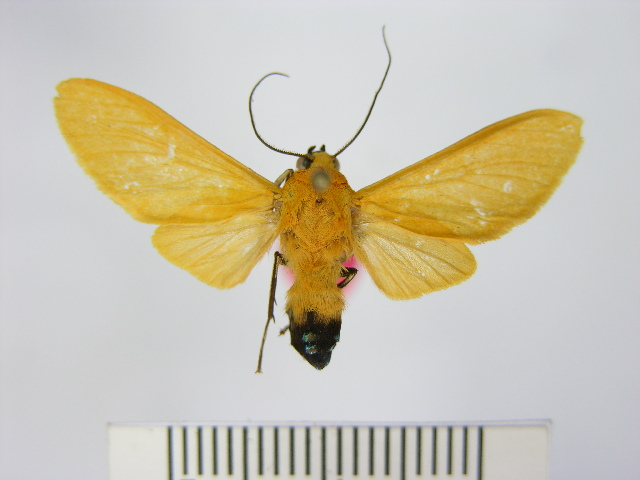

Scientific classification
- Domain: Eukaryota
- Kingdom: Animalia
- Phylum: Arthropoda
- Class: Insecta
- Order: Lepidoptera
- Superfamily: Noctuoidea
- Family: Erebidae
- Subfamily: Arctiinae
- Genus: Ormetica
- Species: O. codasi

Binomial name
- Ormetica codasi (Jörgensen, 1935)

Synonyms
- Automolis codasi Jörgensen, 1935

= Ormetica codasi =

Species of moth

Ormetica codasi is a moth of the family Erebidae. It was described by Peter Jörgensen in 1935. It is found in Paraguay.
