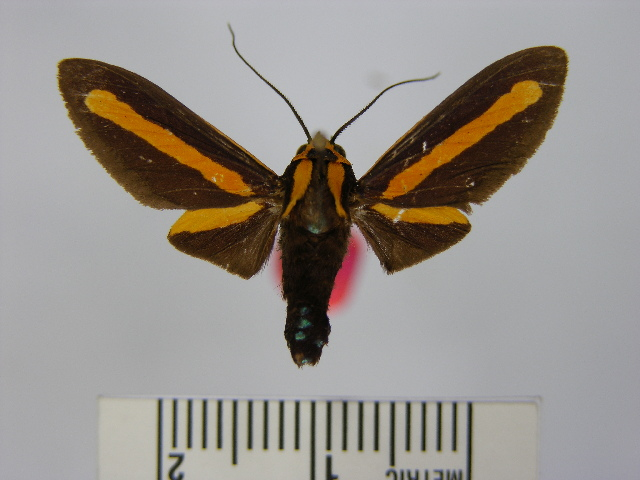

Scientific classification
- Domain: Eukaryota
- Kingdom: Animalia
- Phylum: Arthropoda
- Class: Insecta
- Order: Lepidoptera
- Superfamily: Noctuoidea
- Family: Erebidae
- Subfamily: Arctiinae
- Genus: Ormetica
- Species: O. maura

Binomial name
- Ormetica maura (Schaus, 1910)

Synonyms
- Automolis maura Schaus, 1910

= Ormetica maura =

Species of moth

Ormetica maura is a moth of the family Erebidae. It was described by William Schaus in 1910. It is found in Costa Rica.
