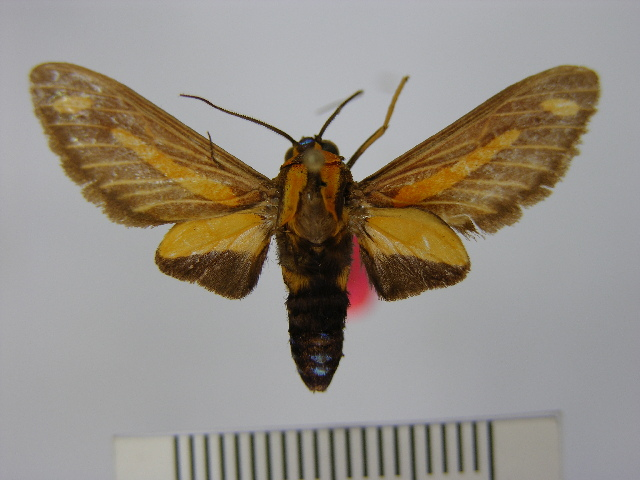

Scientific classification
- Domain: Eukaryota
- Kingdom: Animalia
- Phylum: Arthropoda
- Class: Insecta
- Order: Lepidoptera
- Superfamily: Noctuoidea
- Family: Erebidae
- Subfamily: Arctiinae
- Genus: Ormetica
- Species: O. gerhilda

Binomial name
- Ormetica gerhilda (Schaus, 1933)

Synonyms
- Automolis gerhilda Schaus, 1933

= Ormetica gerhilda =

Species of moth

Ormetica gerhilda is a moth of the family Erebidae. It was described by William Schaus in 1933. It is found in Ecuador.
