= Ormetica postradiata =

Scientific classification
- Domain: Eukaryota
- Kingdom: Animalia
- Phylum: Arthropoda
- Class: Insecta
- Order: Lepidoptera
- Superfamily: Noctuoidea
- Family: Erebidae
- Subfamily: Arctiinae
- Genus: Ormetica
- Species: O. postradiata

Binomial name
- Ormetica postradiata (Schaus, 1924)

Synonyms
- Automolis postradiata Schaus, 1924

Species of moth

Ormetica postradiata is a moth of the family Erebidae. It was described by William Schaus in 1924. It is found in Colombia.
