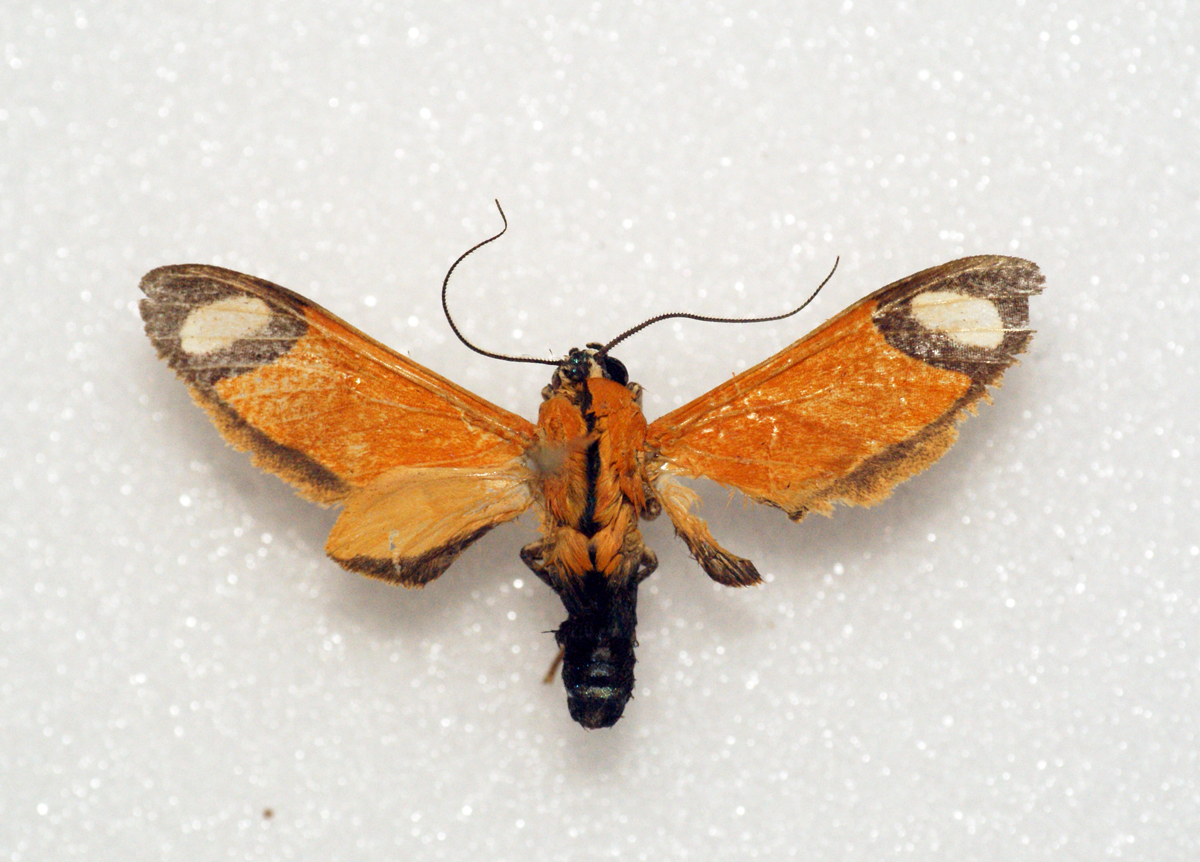
- Male Ormetica contraria

Scientific classification
- Kingdom: Animalia
- Phylum: Arthropoda
- Class: Insecta
- Order: Lepidoptera
- Superfamily: Noctuoidea
- Family: Erebidae
- Subfamily: Arctiinae
- Genus: Ormetica
- Species: O. contraria

Binomial name
- Ormetica contraria (Walker, 1854)

Synonyms
- Euchromia contraria Walker, 1854; Automolis peruviana Rothschild, 1922

= Ormetica contraria =

Species of moth

Ormetica contraria is a moth of the family Erebidae. It was described by Francis Walker in 1854. It is found in French Guiana, Guyana, Brazil, Ecuador, Peru and Bolivia.

== Subspecies ==
- Ormetica contraria contraria (Brazil)
- Ormetica contraria peruviana (Rothschild, 1922) (Peru)
