= Ormetica nabdalsa =

Scientific classification
- Domain: Eukaryota
- Kingdom: Animalia
- Phylum: Arthropoda
- Class: Insecta
- Order: Lepidoptera
- Superfamily: Noctuoidea
- Family: Erebidae
- Subfamily: Arctiinae
- Genus: Ormetica
- Species: O. nabdalsa

Binomial name
- Ormetica nabdalsa (Schaus, 1889)

Synonyms
- Automolis nabdalsa Schaus, 1889

Species of moth

Ormetica nabdalsa is a moth of the family Erebidae. It was described by William Schaus in 1889. It is found in Mexico.
