= Ormetica longilinea =

Scientific classification
- Domain: Eukaryota
- Kingdom: Animalia
- Phylum: Arthropoda
- Class: Insecta
- Order: Lepidoptera
- Superfamily: Noctuoidea
- Family: Erebidae
- Subfamily: Arctiinae
- Genus: Ormetica
- Species: O. longilinea

Binomial name
- Ormetica longilinea (Schaus, 1933)

Synonyms
- Prumala longilinea Schaus, 1933

Species of moth

Ormetica longilinea is a moth of the family Erebidae. It was described by William Schaus in 1933. It is found in Peru and Venezuela.
