= Ormetica fulgurata =

Scientific classification
- Domain: Eukaryota
- Kingdom: Animalia
- Phylum: Arthropoda
- Class: Insecta
- Order: Lepidoptera
- Superfamily: Noctuoidea
- Family: Erebidae
- Subfamily: Arctiinae
- Genus: Ormetica
- Species: O. fulgurata

Binomial name
- Ormetica fulgurata (Butler, 1876)

Synonyms
- Automolis fulgurata Butler, 1876

Species of moth

Ormetica fulgurata is a moth of the family Erebidae. It was described by Arthur Gardiner Butler in 1876. It is found in southern Brazil.
