= Ormetica valera =

Scientific classification
- Domain: Eukaryota
- Kingdom: Animalia
- Phylum: Arthropoda
- Class: Insecta
- Order: Lepidoptera
- Superfamily: Noctuoidea
- Family: Erebidae
- Subfamily: Arctiinae
- Genus: Ormetica
- Species: O. valera

Binomial name
- Ormetica valera (Schaus, 1933)

Synonyms
- Automolis valera Schaus, 1933

Species of moth

Ormetica valera is a moth of the family Erebidae. It was described by William Schaus in 1933. It is found in Venezuela.
