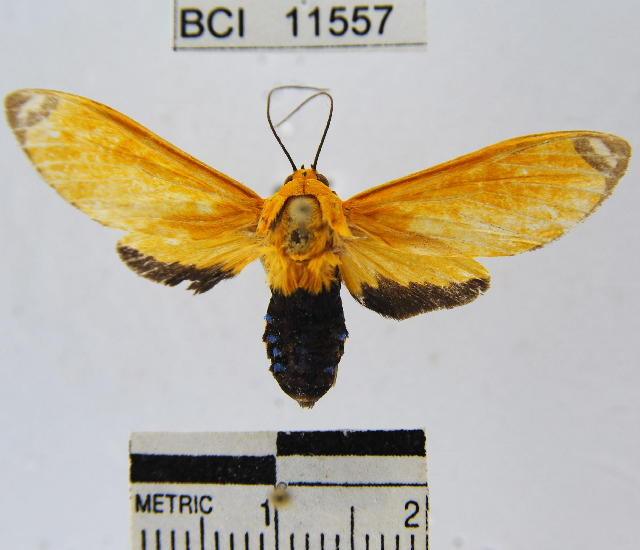

Scientific classification
- Domain: Eukaryota
- Kingdom: Animalia
- Phylum: Arthropoda
- Class: Insecta
- Order: Lepidoptera
- Superfamily: Noctuoidea
- Family: Erebidae
- Subfamily: Arctiinae
- Genus: Ormetica
- Species: O. sicilia

Binomial name
- Ormetica sicilia (H. Druce, 1884)

Synonyms
- Automolis sicilia H. Druce, 1884; Automolis parma Schaus, 1889

= Ormetica sicilia =

Species of moth

Ormetica sicilia is a moth of the family Erebidae. It was described by Herbert Druce in 1884. It is found in Mexico and Panama.
