= Pareiorhina carrancas =

Conservation status
- Least Concern (IUCN 3.1)

Scientific classification
- Kingdom: Animalia
- Phylum: Chordata
- Class: Actinopterygii
- Order: Siluriformes
- Family: Loricariidae
- Genus: Pareiorhina
- Species: P. carrancas

Binomial name
- Pareiorhina carrancas Bockmann & A. C. Ribeiro, 2003

Species of catfish

Pareiorhina carrancas is a species of freshwater ray-finned fish belonging to the family Loricariidae, the suckermouth armoured catfishes, and the subfamily Hypoptopomatinae, the cascudinhos. This catfish is endemic to Brazil.

== Taxonomy ==
Pareiorhina carrancas was first formally described in 2005 by the Brazilian ichthyologists Flávio Alicino Bockmann and Alexandre Cunha Ribeiro with its type locality given as the stream of Debaixo da Serra, an upper course tributary of Beijinho stream, which is in turn a left margin tributary of the Grande River at the Camargos Reservoir, in the foothills of the Serra de Carrancas at 44°36'08.7"W, 21°26'39.7"S, Carrancas in the Brazilian state of Minas Gerais. Eschmeyer's Catalog of Fishes classifies the genus Pareiorhina in the subfamily Hypoptopomatinae, the cascudinhos, within the suckermouth armored catfish family Loricariidae.

== Etymology ==
Pareiorhina carrancas is classified within the genus ''Pareiorhina, this name combines pareiá, meaning "cheek", with rhina, from rhínē, which means "file" or "rasp", this is probably an allusion to the rough sides of the head. The specific name, carrancas, is the name of the municipality in Minas Gerais in which this species type locality is located.

== Description ==
Pareiorhina brachyrhyncha has an elongated body shape and it reaches a standard length of 4.1 cm (1.6 in).

== Distribution and habitat ==
Pareiorhina brachyrhyncha is endemic to Brazil where has been recorded from its type locality, the creek of Debaixo da Serra, as well as the Sapateiro stream, municipality of Barbacena, both in Minas Gerais. This catfish is restricted to headwaters with the type locality being in a relatively natural state with abundant vegetation.
