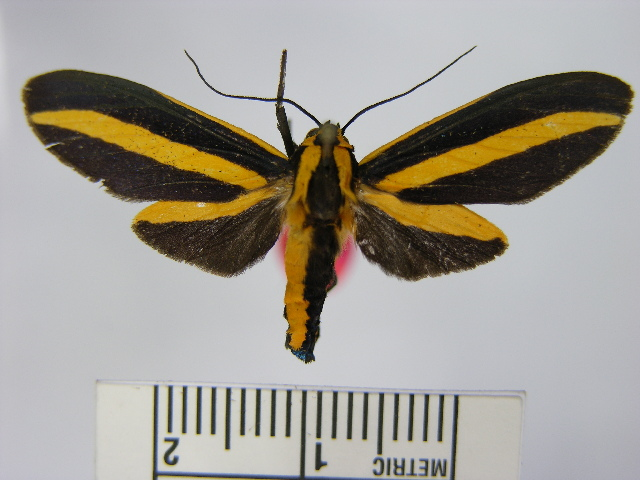

Scientific classification
- Kingdom: Animalia
- Phylum: Arthropoda
- Clade: Pancrustacea
- Class: Insecta
- Order: Lepidoptera
- Superfamily: Noctuoidea
- Family: Erebidae
- Subfamily: Arctiinae
- Genus: Ormetica
- Species: O. taeniata

Binomial name
- Ormetica taeniata (Guérin-Méneville, [1844])

Synonyms
- Chelonia taeniata Guérin-Méneville, [1844]; Ormetica sphingiformis Clemens, 1861; Automolis imitata Druce, 1884

= Ormetica taeniata =

Species of moth

Ormetica taeniata is a moth of the family Erebidae. It was described by Félix Édouard Guérin-Méneville in 1844. It lives in Mexico, Costa Rica and Guatemala.
