= Ormetica pseudoguapisa =

Scientific classification
- Kingdom: Animalia
- Phylum: Arthropoda
- Clade: Pancrustacea
- Class: Insecta
- Order: Lepidoptera
- Superfamily: Noctuoidea
- Family: Erebidae
- Subfamily: Arctiinae
- Genus: Ormetica
- Species: O. pseudoguapisa

Binomial name
- Ormetica pseudoguapisa (Rothschild, 1910)

Synonyms
- Automolis pseudoguapisa Rothschild, 1910

Species of moth

Ormetica pseudoguapisa is a moth of the family Erebidae. It was described by Walter Rothschild in 1910, with the type locality given as San Esteban, Venezuela.
