= Ormetica sphingidea =

Scientific classification
- Domain: Eukaryota
- Kingdom: Animalia
- Phylum: Arthropoda
- Class: Insecta
- Order: Lepidoptera
- Superfamily: Noctuoidea
- Family: Erebidae
- Subfamily: Arctiinae
- Genus: Ormetica
- Species: O. sphingidea

Binomial name
- Ormetica sphingidea (Perty, 1833)

Synonyms
- Glaucopsis sphingidea Perty, 1833; Euplesia vittigera Felder, 1874

Species of moth

Ormetica sphingidea is a moth of the subfamily Arctiinae. It was described by Maximilian Perty in 1833. It is found in French Guiana, Guyana and Brazil.
