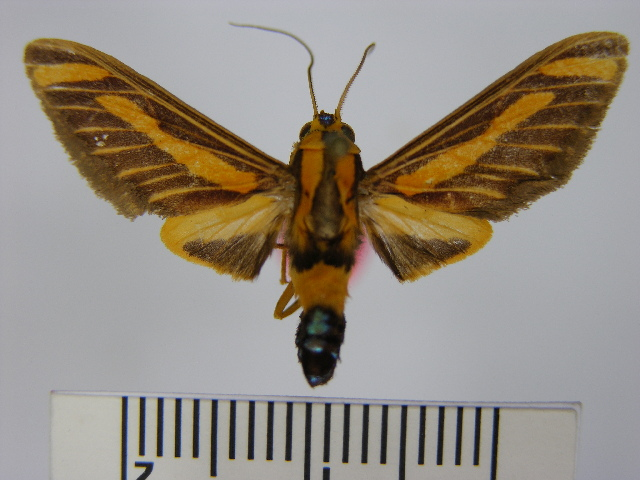

Scientific classification
- Domain: Eukaryota
- Kingdom: Animalia
- Phylum: Arthropoda
- Class: Insecta
- Order: Lepidoptera
- Superfamily: Noctuoidea
- Family: Erebidae
- Subfamily: Arctiinae
- Genus: Ormetica
- Species: O. sypilus

Binomial name
- Ormetica sypilus (Cramer, [1777])

Synonyms
- Sphinx sypilus Cramer, [1777]; Automolis saturata Walker, 1856; Eucyrta praetexta Felder, 1874

= Ormetica sypilus =

Species of moth

Ormetica sypilus is a moth of the family Erebidae first described by Pieter Cramer in 1777. It is found in Suriname, Brazil, Ecuador and French Guiana.
