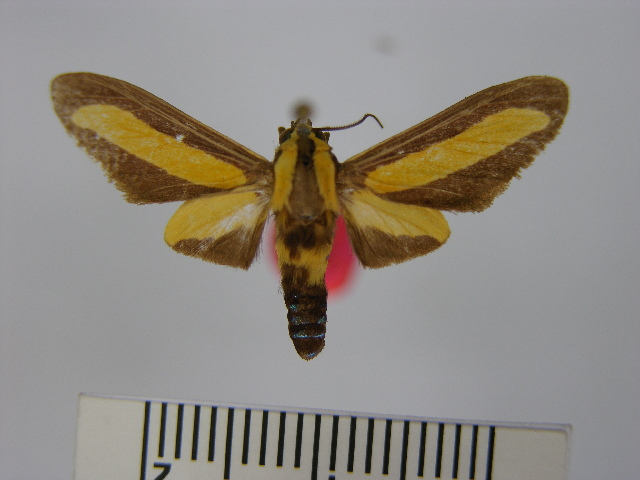

Scientific classification
- Domain: Eukaryota
- Kingdom: Animalia
- Phylum: Arthropoda
- Class: Insecta
- Order: Lepidoptera
- Superfamily: Noctuoidea
- Family: Erebidae
- Subfamily: Arctiinae
- Genus: Ormetica
- Species: O. flavobasalis

Binomial name
- Ormetica flavobasalis (Gaede, 1923)

Synonyms
- Automolis flavobasalis Gaede, 1923

= Ormetica flavobasalis =

Species of moth

Ormetica flavobasalis is a moth of the family Erebidae. It was described by Max Gaede in 1923. It is found in Bolivia.
