= Ormetica stenotis =

Scientific classification
- Domain: Eukaryota
- Kingdom: Animalia
- Phylum: Arthropoda
- Class: Insecta
- Order: Lepidoptera
- Superfamily: Noctuoidea
- Family: Erebidae
- Subfamily: Arctiinae
- Genus: Ormetica
- Species: O. stenotis

Binomial name
- Ormetica stenotis (Dognin, 1908)

Synonyms
- Automolis stenotis Dognin, 1908

Species of moth

Ormetica stenotis is a moth of the family Erebidae. It was described by Paul Dognin in 1908. It is found in French Guiana, Guyana, Brazil and Venezuela.
