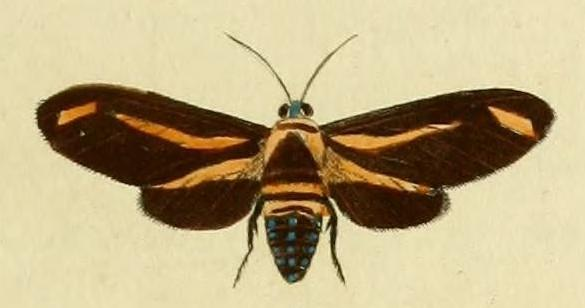
- Ormetica sypilus

Scientific classification
- Kingdom: Animalia
- Phylum: Arthropoda
- Clade: Pancrustacea
- Class: Insecta
- Order: Lepidoptera
- Superfamily: Noctuoidea
- Family: Erebidae
- Subfamily: Arctiinae
- Tribe: Arctiini
- Subtribe: Phaegopterina
- Genus: Ormetica; Clemens, 1861

Synonyms
- Euplesia Felder, 1874

= Ormetica =

Genus of moths

Ormetica is a genus of moths in the family Erebidae.

== Species ==
- Ormetica abdalsan (Schaus, 1920)
- Ormetica albimaculifera (Hampson, 1901)
- Ormetica ameoides (Butler, 1876)
- Ormetica ataenia (Schaus, 1910)
- Ormetica bonora (Schaus, 1905)
- Ormetica chrysomelas (Walker, 1856)
- Ormetica codasi (Jörgensen, 1935)
- Ormetica collateralis (Hampson, 1901)
- Ormetica contraria (Walker, 1854)
- Ormetica flavobasalis (Gaede, 1923)
- Ormetica fulgurata (Butler, 1876)
- Ormetica gerhilda (Schaus, 1933)
- Ormetica goloma (Schaus, 1920)
- Ormetica guapisa (Schaus, 1910)
- Ormetica iheringi (Schaus, 1921)
- Ormetica latania (Druce, 1890)
- Ormetica longilinea (Schaus, 1933)
- Ormetica maura (Schaus, 1910)
- Ormetica melea (Druce, 1900)
- Ormetica metallica (Joicey & Talbot, 1916)
- Ormetica nabdalsa (Schaus, 1889)
- Ormetica neira (Schaus, 1905)
- Ormetica ochreomarginata (Joicey & Talbot, 1918)
- Ormetica orbona (Schaus, 1889)
- Ormetica packardi (Butler, 1876)
- Ormetica pallidifascia (Rothschild, 1933)
- Ormetica pallidinervis (Rothschild, 1935)
- Ormetica pauperis (Schaus, 1910)
- Ormetica postradiata (Schaus, 1924)
- Ormetica pratti (Druce, 1900)
- Ormetica pretiosa (Schaus, 1921)
- Ormetica pseudoguapisa (Rothschild, 1910)
- Ormetica rosenbergi (Rothschild, 1909)
- Ormetica rothschildi Watson, 1975
- Ormetica sicilia (Druce, 1884)
- Ormetica sphingidea (Perty, 1833)
- Ormetica stenotis (Dognin, 1908)
- Ormetica sypalettius (Seitz, 1921)
- Ormetica sypilus (Cramer, [1777])
- Ormetica taeniata (Guérin-Méneville, [1844])
- Ormetica taniala (Schaus, 1910)
- Ormetica tanialoides (Rothschild, 1910)
- Ormetica temperata (Schaus, 1921)
- Ormetica triangularis (Gaede, 1928)
- Ormetica underwoodi (Rothschild, 1909)
- Ormetica valera (Schaus, 1933)
- Ormetica xanthia (Hampson, 1901)
- Ormetica zenzeroides (Butler, 1877)
