= Pareiorhina brachyrhyncha =

Conservation status
- Near Threatened (IUCN 3.1)

Scientific classification
- Kingdom: Animalia
- Phylum: Chordata
- Class: Actinopterygii
- Division: Teleostei
- Order: Siluriformes
- Family: Loricariidae
- Genus: Pareiorhina
- Species: P. brachyrhyncha

Binomial name
- Pareiorhina brachyrhyncha Chamon, Aranda & Buckup, 2005

Species of catfish

Pareiorhina brachyrhyncha is a species of freshwater ray-finned fish belonging to the family Loricariidae, the suckermouth armoured catfishes, and the subfamily Hypoptopomatinae, the cascudinhos. This catfish is endemic to Brazil.

== Taxonomy ==
Pareiorhina brachyrhyncha was first formally described in 2005 by the Brazilian ichthyologists Carine Cavalcante Chamon, Arion Tulio Aranda and Paulo Andreas Buckup with its type locality given as Vera Cruz farm at 22°46'14.1"S, 45°26'42.5"W, in the neighbourhood of Ribeirão Grande, Ribeirão Grande (also known as the Teteqüera), in the municipality of Pindamonhangaba in the Brazilian state of São Paulo. Eschmeyer's Catalog of Fishes classifies the genus Pareiorhina in the subfamily Hypoptopomatinae, the cascudinhos, within the suckermouth armored catfish family Loricariidae.

== Etymology ==
Pareiorhina brachyrhyncha is classified within the genus ''Pareiorhina, this name combines pareiá, meaning "cheek", with rhina, from rhínē, which means "file" or "rasp", this is probably an allusion to the rough sides of the head. The specific name, brachyrhyncha, means "short-snout", a reference to the shape of its snout, which is short in comparison to the other species in the genus which were known when this species was described.

== Description ==
Pareiorhina brachyrhyncha can be told apart from the other species in its genus by having very few or no unpaired plates in fron of the nuchal plate, , the teeth have a tiny cusp to their sides, its wider body shape and lower number of vertebrae. This catfish has an elongated body shape and it reaches a standard length of 4.2 cm (1.7 in).

== Distribution and habitat ==
Pareiorhina brachyrhyncha is endemic to Brazil where has been recorded from a few localities in the Paraíba do Sul River basin in the municipalities of Pindamonhangaba and Guaratinguetá in São Paulo state. There are also records from the small drainages of the Ribeirão dos Buenos and Guaratinguetá rivers in the eastern Mantiqueira Mountains. This catfish was collected from streams with crystal clear, highly oxygenated, fast flowing water.
