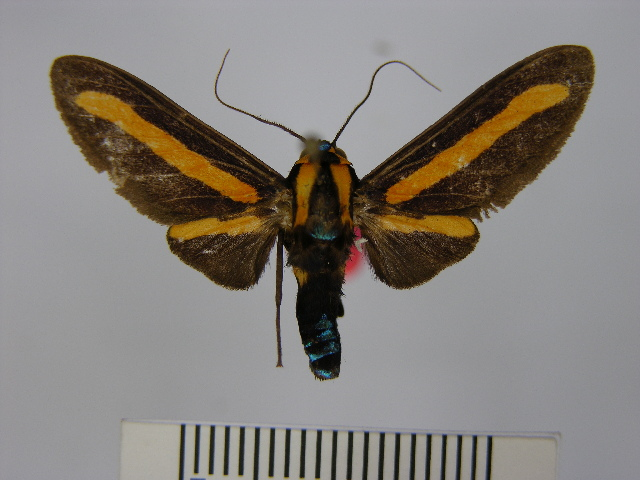

Scientific classification
- Domain: Eukaryota
- Kingdom: Animalia
- Phylum: Arthropoda
- Class: Insecta
- Order: Lepidoptera
- Superfamily: Noctuoidea
- Family: Erebidae
- Subfamily: Arctiinae
- Genus: Ormetica
- Species: O. melea

Binomial name
- Ormetica melea (H. Druce, 1900)

Synonyms
- Automolis melea H. Druce, 1900

= Ormetica melea =

Species of moth

Ormetica melea is a moth of the family Erebidae. It was described by Herbert Druce in 1900. It is found in Venezuela.
