= Ormetica underwoodi =

Scientific classification
- Domain: Eukaryota
- Kingdom: Animalia
- Phylum: Arthropoda
- Class: Insecta
- Order: Lepidoptera
- Superfamily: Noctuoidea
- Family: Erebidae
- Subfamily: Arctiinae
- Genus: Ormetica
- Species: O. underwoodi

Binomial name
- Ormetica underwoodi (Rothschild, 1909)

Synonyms
- Automolis underwoodi Rothschild, 1909

Species of moth

Ormetica underwoodi is a moth of the family Erebidae. It was described by Walter Rothschild in 1909. It is found in Costa Rica.
