= Ormetica abdalsan =

Scientific classification
- Domain: Eukaryota
- Kingdom: Animalia
- Phylum: Arthropoda
- Class: Insecta
- Order: Lepidoptera
- Superfamily: Noctuoidea
- Family: Erebidae
- Subfamily: Arctiinae
- Genus: Ormetica
- Species: O. abdalsan

Binomial name
- Ormetica abdalsan (Schaus, 1920)

Synonyms
- Automolis abdalsan Schaus, 1920

Species of moth

Ormetica abdalsan is a moth of the family Erebidae. It was described by William Schaus in 1920. It is found in Guatemala.
