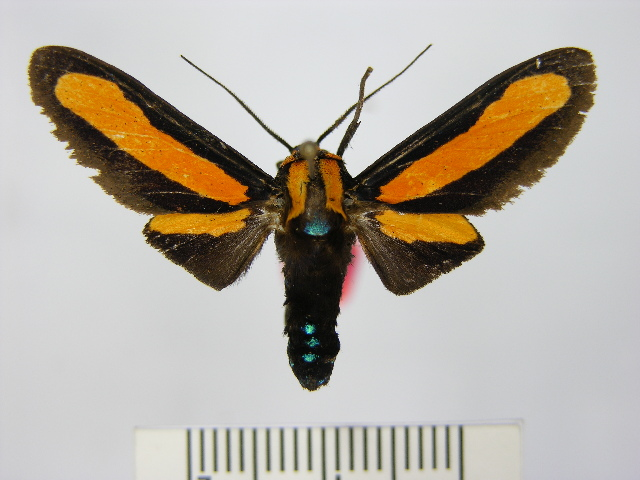

Scientific classification
- Domain: Eukaryota
- Kingdom: Animalia
- Phylum: Arthropoda
- Class: Insecta
- Order: Lepidoptera
- Superfamily: Noctuoidea
- Family: Erebidae
- Subfamily: Arctiinae
- Genus: Ormetica
- Species: O. triangularis

Binomial name
- Ormetica triangularis (Gaede, 1928)

Synonyms
- Automolis triangularis Gaede, 1928

= Ormetica triangularis =

Species of moth

Ormetica triangularis is a moth of the family Erebidae. It was described by Max Gaede in 1928. It is found in Colombia.
