= Pareiorhina cepta =

Conservation status
- Least Concern (IUCN 3.1)

Scientific classification
- Kingdom: Animalia
- Phylum: Chordata
- Class: Actinopterygii
- Order: Siluriformes
- Family: Loricariidae
- Genus: Pareiorhina
- Species: P. cepta

Binomial name
- Pareiorhina cepta Roxo, G. S. C. Silva, Mehanna & Oliveira, 2012

Species of catfish

Pareiorhina cepta is a species of freshwater ray-finned fish belonging to the family Loricariidae, the suckermouth armoured catfishes, and the subfamily Hypoptopomatinae, the cascudinhos. This catfish is endemic to Brazil.

== Taxonomy ==
Pareiorhina cepta was first formally described in 2005 by the Brazilian ichthyologists Fábio Fernandes Roxo, Gabriel de Souza da Costa e Silva, Mahmoud Mehanna and Cluadio de Oliveira with its type locality given as the Lavapés Stream, a tributary of the Santo Antonio River, which flows into the Samburá River, a tributary of the São Francisco River at 20°08'36"S, 46°38'21"W in São Roque de Minasin the Brazilian state of Minas Gerais. Eschmeyer's Catalog of Fishes classifies the genus Pareiorhina in the subfamily Hypoptopomatinae, the cascudinhos, within the suckermouth armored catfish family Loricariidae.

== Etymology ==
Pareiorhina cepta is classified within the genus ''Pareiorhina, this name combines pareiá, meaning "cheek", with rhina, from rhínē, which means "file" or "rasp", this is probably an allusion to the rough sides of the head. The specific name, cepta, is derived from the acronym CEPTA which tsands for Centro de Pesquisa Treinamento em Aquacultura (Aquaculture Research and Training Centre), Pirassununga, São Paulo which organised the expedition the holotype was collected on.

== Distribution ==
Pareiorhina cepta has an elongated body and it reaches a standard length of 4.4 cm (1.7 in). This species can be told apart from the other species in its genus by the possessoion of randomly scattered plates covered with odontodes on the underside, as opposed to noe. It also has a dark caudal fin with a single hyalaine bar.

== Distribution and habitat ==
Pareiorhina ceptais endemic to Brazil where it occurs in the headwaters of the São Francisco River and some of its tributaries. It is known to occur alongside the species Astyanax rivularis, Characidium fasciatum, Neoplecostomus franciscoensis, and Trichomycterus macrotrichopterus. The streams in which Pareiorhina cepta occurs are characterized by an elevation of 810 to 1065 m (2657 to 3494 ft) above sea level, a width of 3 to 5 m (10 to 16 ft), a depth of 25 to 150 cm (9.8 to 59.1 inches), a temperature of 16.6 to 19.5 °C (61.9 to 67.1 °F), a highly acidic pH of 2.78 to 2.87, a conductivity of 0.013 to 0.014 μS/cm, an oxygen concentration of 5.91 to 13.05 mg/L, clear water, moderate to fast flow, marginal vegetation, and a substrate composed of rocks, gravel, and sand.
