= Pareiorhina rudolphi =

Conservation status
- Near Threatened (IUCN 3.1)

Scientific classification
- Kingdom: Animalia
- Phylum: Chordata
- Class: Actinopterygii
- Order: Siluriformes
- Family: Loricariidae
- Genus: Pareiorhina
- Species: P. rudolphi

Binomial name
- Pareiorhina rudolphi (A. Miranda-Ribeiro, 1911)

Synonyms
- Plecostomus (Rhinelepis) microps Ihering, 1907; Rhinelepis rudolphi A. Miranda Ribeiro, 1911

Species of catfish

Pareiorhina rudolphi is a species of freshwater ray-finned fish belonging to the family Loricariidae, the suckermouth armoured catfishes, and the subfamily Hypoptopomatinae, the cascudinhos. This catfish is endemic to Brazil.

== Taxonomy ==
Pareiorhina rudolphi was first formally described as Plecostomus (Rhinelepis) microps in 1907 by the Brazilian biologist and fish culturist Rodolpho von Ihering with its type locality given as Piquete (Lorena), upper reaches of rio Paraíba do Sul basin in the Brazilian state of São Paulo. The name was objectively invalid as it was preccupied by Plecostomus microps, described by Franz Steindachner in 1876. In 1911 Alípio de Miranda Ribeiro renamed Ihering's taxon Rhinelepis rudolphi. In 1947 William Alonzo Gosline proposed the new monospecific genus, Pareiorhina, with R. rudolphi designated as its type species, as well as being its only species. Eschmeyer's Catalog of Fishes classifies the genus Pareiorhina in the subfamily Hypoptopomatinae, the cascudinhos, within the suckermouth armored catfish family Loricariidae.

== Etymology ==
Pareiorhina rudolphi is classified within the genus ''Pareiorhina, this name combines pareiá, meaning "cheek", with rhina, from rhínē, which means "file" or "rasp", this is probably an allusion to the rough sides of the head. The specific name honours Rodolpho von Ihering, the original describer of this species.

== Description ==
Pareiorhina rudolphi reaches a standard length of 4.9 cm (1.9 in).

== Distribution and habitat ==
Pareiorhina rudolphi is endemic to Brazil, where it is found in the upper and middle basin of the Paraiba do Sul in São Paulo state. It occurs in streams flowing off the eastern Mantiqueira Mountains and on the adjacent pediplains in fast flowing, cascade reaches of these streams.

== Biology ==
Pareiorhina rudolphi grazes on periphyton. Spawning takes place between October and February, with the breeding cycle completed in April.

== Conservation status ==
Pareiorhina rudolphi has only been recorded from a few localities and it has been extirpated from two of these, its habitat is threatened by urbanisation. The International Union for Conservation of Nature has classified this catfish as Near Threatened.
