= Pareiorhina pelicicei =

Conservation status
- Data Deficient (IUCN 3.1)

Scientific classification
- Kingdom: Animalia
- Phylum: Chordata
- Class: Actinopterygii
- Division: Teleostei
- Order: Siluriformes
- Family: Loricariidae
- Genus: Pareiorhina
- Species: P. pelicicei

Binomial name
- Pareiorhina pelicicei Azevedo-Santos & Roxo, 2015

Species of catfish

Pareiorhina pelicicei is a species of freshwater ray-finned fish belonging to the family Loricariidae, the suckermouth armoured catfishes, and the subfamily Hypoptopomatinae, the cascudinhos. This catfish is endemic to Brazil.

== Taxonomy ==
Pareiorhina pelicicei was first formally described in 2015 by the Brazilian ichthyologists Valter Monteiro de Azevedo-Santos and Fábio Fernandes Roxo with its type locality given as the Tamborete stream a tributary of the Rio Grande in the upper basin of the Paraná River at 20°38'38"S, 46°10'13"W in the municipality of Capitólio in the Brazilian state of Minas Gerais. Eschmeyer's Catalog of Fishes classifies the genus Pareiorhina in the subfamily Hypoptopomatinae, the cascudinhos, within the suckermouth armored catfish family Loricariidae.

== Etymology ==
Pareiorhina pelicicei is classified within the genus ''Pareiorhina, this name combines pareiá, meaning "cheek", with rhina, from rhínē, which means "file" or "rasp", this is probably an allusion to the rough sides of the head. The specific name honours the Brazilian ichthyologist Fernando Mayer Pelicice, of the Universidade Federal do Tocantins, in recognition of his research into fish ecology and the impacts of dams on Neotropical fishes.

== Description ==
Pareiorhina pelicicei has 7 soft rays in the dorsal fin and 5 in the anal fin and it reaches a standard length of 4.7 cm (1.9 in). This species can be told apart from all other species in its genus by its having a lower number of vertebrae and having a lateral cusp on its tiny teeth.

== Distribution and habitat ==
Pareiorhina pelicicei is endemic to Brazil, where it is known only from its type locality, the Tamborate stream, in Capitólio in Minas Gerais. This species was collected from a clearwater stream with a substrate of bedrock and gravel and the fishes were usually found in lotic stretches of the stream. Fishes sampled from the same stretches were Psalidodon scabripinnis and species of Trichomycterus.

== Conservation status ==
Pareiorhina pelicicei has only been recorded from its type locality and the area has not been thoroughly surveyed by ichthyologists so the extent of its range , its biology and anythreats to its population are poorly know. The International Union for Conservation of Nature has classified this catfish as Data Deficient.
