= Rodolpho von Ihering =

Brazilian zoologist and biologist

Rodolpho Theodor Wilhelm Gaspar von Ihering (born Taquara, 17 July 1883; died 15 September 1939) was a Brazilian zoologist and biologist, who is considered to be one of the founders of pisciculture in Brazil.

== Biography ==
von Ihering was the son of German zoologist Hermann von Ihering and Anna Maria Clara Belzer, and grandson of Rudolf von Jhering. He married Isabel de Azevedo, daughter of Colonel Luis Gonzaga de Azevedo, with whom he had two daughters, Maria and Dora, and a son, who died at the age of four. As a child he spent a lot of time in his father's laboratory and this gave him a grounding in Zoology and when he graduated from the University of São Paulo in 1901 with a Bachelor of Science and Letters in 1901 his father, who was Director of the Museu Paulista, appointed him as deputy director for finance of the museum that year. He published his first scientific paper in 1903 and he mainly published in the Magazine of the Paulista Museum, often on systematics.

In 1911 he travelled to Europe where he spent almost a year working at the Biological Station in Naples, then at the University of Vienna, and finally at the Musée National d'Histoire Naturelle in Paris, where he worked with Eugène Louis Bouvier.

In 1917 Hermann von Ihering was dismissed from his position of director of the Museu Paulista on Brazil's entry into World War I on the Allied side. In protest, Rodolpho left the museum and opened a small metalworks factory, Fábrica Santa Izabel, where he worked for the next ten years. During this period, however, he continued to be an active naturalist. In 1926 and 1927 he began to work in the Parasitology laboratory of the School of Medicine of the University of São Paulo, which had been established by the entomologist Lauro Pereira Travassos. From 1927 he concentrated his research in the field of ichthyology, describing many new species of fish. He began to work at the Biological Institute of Agricultural and Animal Defence of São Paulo, which was founded in 1927, as assistant in the Entomology and Animal Parasitology section and as head of the Zoology Section. It was dedicated to the study of the breeding biology of fish of the region of the State of São Paulo, especially of the Billings Reservoir, and of rivers in Mogi Guaçu, the Tietê and the Piracicaba. From 1931, Ihering dedicated himself exclusively to the economics and biology of fish farming. Ilhering learnt the Tupi-Guarani language, so that he could understand the etymologicalical roots of the names of Brazilian animals and from this an important work was born: "Dicionário dos animais do Brasil ("Dictionary of the Animals of Brazil"), which was published by the University of Brasília in the year following Ilhering's death, 1940.

From 1932 until 1937 Ihering was the head of the Technical Commission of Fisheries of the Nordeste, assisting rapid growth in the pisciculture in that region and in the world, through the development of hypophysation, a technique of artificially encouraging fish to reproduce by removing the hypophysis or pituitary gland from a fish, preparing it and then injecting the preparation into another mature fish, of either sex, to promote final maturation and spawning. During this period he oversaw the establishment of fish farms in Pirassununga and Porto Alegre. He died suddenly in 1939.

Ihering was a member of the Brazilian Academy of Sciences, the Society of Biology of São Paulo, the Clube Zoológico do Brasil, the Limnological Society of America and the American Fisheries Society. He was awarded an honorary doctor by the University of Giessen.

== Taxa named in his honor ==
Ilhering's name has been given to 23 species of the Brazilian fauna, including 3 insects, 10 fish and a reptile:

=== Insects ===
The mite Periglischrus iheringi Oudemans, 1902

The spider wasp Entypus iheringi (Fox, 1899)

The ant Octostruma iheringi (Emery, 1888)

The beetle, Hoplistocerus iheringi Gounelle, 1906

The South American tarantula Grammostola iheringi (Keyserling, 1891)

The ant, Wasmannia iheringi Forel, 1908

The intertidal spider from Brazil and Argentina, Metaltella iheringi (Keyserling, 1891)

The beetle, Stenoeme iheringi Gounelle, 1909

The moth, Ormetica iheringi (Schaus, 1921)

The beetle, Cauarana iheringi (Gounelle, 1910)

=== Fish ===
The catfish Pareiorhina rudolphi (A. Miranda-Ribeiro, 1911)

The catfish Cetopsorhamdia iheringi Schubart & A. L. Gomes, 1959

The genus of catfishes Iheringichthys Eigenmann & Norris, 1900

The South American bumblebee catfish Microglanis iheringi A. L. Gomes, 1946

The catfish Hypostomus iheringii (Regan, 1908)

=== Birds ===
The Narrow-billed antwren Formicivora iheringi Hellmayr, 1909

==== Reptiles ====
The reptile is Ihering's snake, Lioheterophis iheringi Amaral, 1935

=== Other ===
A land planarian, Choeradoplana iheringi Graff, 1899

Potamolithus iheringi Pilsbry, 1896 is a species of gastropod belonging to the family Tateidae.

The freshwater ostracod, Chlamydotheca iheringi (Sars, 1901) Klie, 1931

The land snail Gastrocopta iheringi (Suter, 1900)

The freshwater snail, Felipponea iheringi (Pilsbry, 1933)

The saltwater clam, Trinitasia iheringi (Dall, 1897)

The marine bivalve mollusc, Tellina iheringi Dall, 1908

The Land Snail, Radiodiscus iheringi (Ancey, 1899)

The sea snail, Retigyra iheringi (Dautzenberg & H. Fischer, 1897)

== Legacy ==
The Brazilian Society of Zoology, instituted the Rodolpho von Ihering Prize for the best zoology article, book or book chapter published in Brazil in each year. The Rodolpho von Ihering Ichthyology Research Center in Pentecoste, Ceará is named after him; while the Rodolpho von Ihering Library, remains in the collection of the Experimental Station of Biology and Fisheries of Pirassununga, in 1981.

== Publications ==
The principal published works of Ihering are:

- O Livrinho das Aves (1914).
- Fauna do Brasil (1917).
- Da Vida Dos Peixes (1923).
- Contos de um Naturalista (1924).
- No Campo e na Floresta (1927).
- Da Vida dos Nossos Animais (1934).
- Dicionário dos animais do Brasil (1940).

== Taxon described by him ==
- See Category:Taxa named by Rodolpho von Ihering
