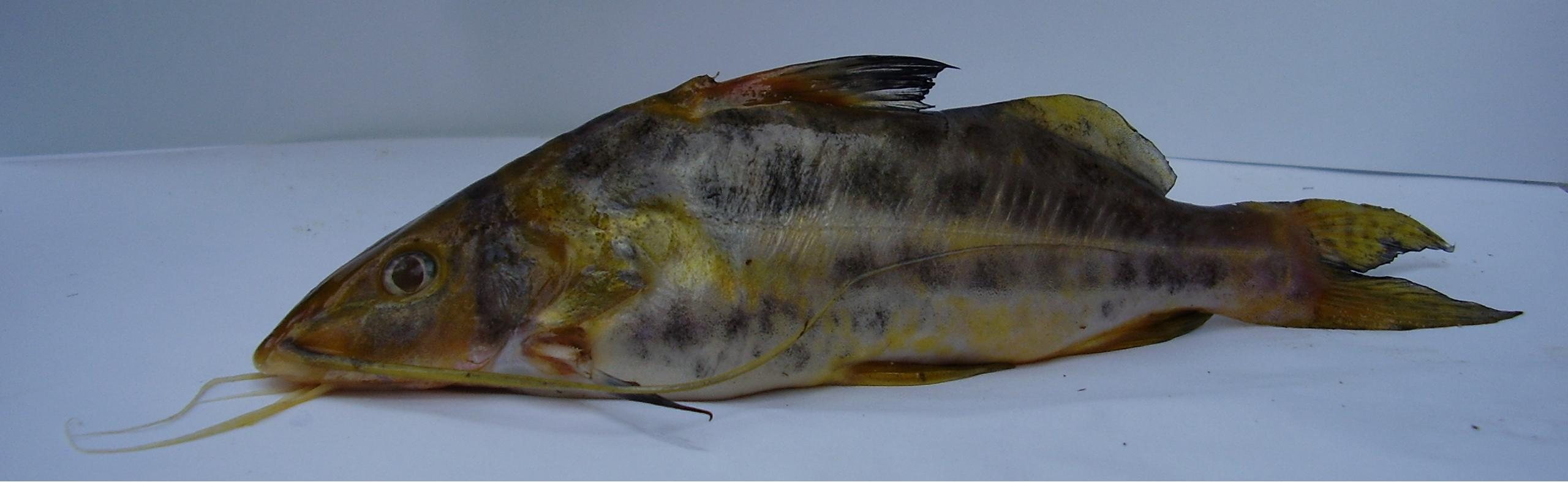
- Iheringichthys labrosus from Rio Uruguay

Scientific classification
- Kingdom: Animalia
- Phylum: Chordata
- Class: Actinopterygii
- Order: Siluriformes
- Family: Pimelodidae
- Genus: Iheringichthys; C. H. Eigenmann & Norris, 1900

Type species
- Pimelodus labrosus Lütken, 1874

= Iheringichthys =

Genus of fishes

Iheringichthys is a small genus of long-whiskered catfish native to South America.

== Species ==
There are currently three recognized species in this genus:

- Iheringichthys labrosus (Lütken, 1874)
- Iheringichthys megalops C. H. Eigenmann & Ward, 1907
- Iheringichthys syi Azpelicueta & Britski, 2012

== Distribution ==
All species of Iheringichthys are distributed in the Paraná River basin.

== Appearance and anatomy ==
Iheringichthys species have a narrow, small mouth positioned to point downwards.

== Ecology ==
I. labrosus has been studied to feed off of the bottom, mainly at dawn and during daytime hours. Main items in the diet of I. labrosus are aquatic insects (mainly Chironomidae) and mollusks (mainly Bivalvia). Studies on I. labrosus demonstrates that this species is non-migratory and does not exhibit any parental care. These fish reproduce all year, with spawning peaking from February to May.

== Relationship to humans ==
I. labrosus is a secondary commercial fish species in the Itaipu Reservoir. With the end of the trophic upsurge period in the Itaipu Reservoir, secondary species may become important resources for the commercial fishery, including I. labrosus. It is an important fish species in other reservoirs of the basin, especially Promissão and Água Vermelha Reservoirs. It is also an important sport fish in the sand beaches (“mandizeiros”) fishery along the upper Paraná River channel and main tributaries.
