= Ormetica iheringi =

Scientific classification
- Domain: Eukaryota
- Kingdom: Animalia
- Phylum: Arthropoda
- Class: Insecta
- Order: Lepidoptera
- Superfamily: Noctuoidea
- Family: Erebidae
- Subfamily: Arctiinae
- Genus: Ormetica
- Species: O. iheringi

Binomial name
- Ormetica iheringi (Schaus, 1921)

Synonyms
- Automolis iheringi Schaus, 1921

Species of moth

Ormetica iheringi is a moth of the family Erebidae. It was described by William Schaus in 1921. It is found in Brazil.
