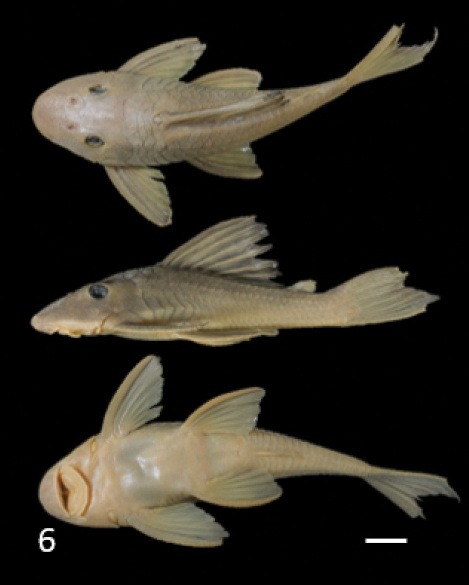
- Specimen from the Uberaba River, Paraná. Scale bar 10 mm

Conservation status
- Least Concern (IUCN 3.1)

Scientific classification
- Kingdom: Animalia
- Phylum: Chordata
- Class: Actinopterygii
- Division: Teleostei
- Order: Siluriformes
- Family: Loricariidae
- Genus: Hypostomus
- Species: H. regani

Binomial name
- Hypostomus regani (Ihering, 1905)

Synonyms
- Plecostomus regani

= Hypostomus regani =

Species of fish

Hypostomus regani is a species of catfish in the family Loricariidae. It is native to South America, where it occurs in the basins of the Paraná River, the Paraguay River, and the Uruguay River. The species reaches 41 cm (16 in) SL and is believed to be a facultative air-breather.

== Etymology ==
The fish is named in honor of English ichthyologist Charles Tate Regan (1878–1943), of the Natural History Museum in London.

== Aquarium ==
H. regani appears in the aquarium trade, where it is typically known as the giant white-spot pleco.
