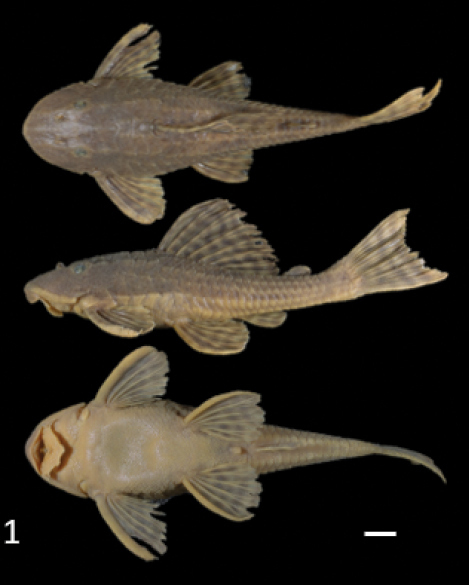
- Specimen from the Uberaba River, Paraná. Scale bar 10 mm

Conservation status
- Least Concern (IUCN 3.1)

Scientific classification
- Kingdom: Animalia
- Phylum: Chordata
- Class: Actinopterygii
- Division: Teleostei
- Order: Siluriformes
- Family: Loricariidae
- Genus: Hypostomus
- Species: H. ancistroides

Binomial name
- Hypostomus ancistroides (Ihering, 1911)

Synonyms
- Plecostomus ancistroides Ihering, 1911

= Hypostomus ancistroides =

Species of fish

Hypostomus ancistroidesis a species of freshwater ray-finned fish belonging to the family Loricariidae, the suckermouth armored catfishes, and the subfamily Hypostominae, the suckermouth catfishes. This catfish occurs in the basins of the upper Parańa, Ribeira do Iguape and Paranapanema rivers in the Brazilian states of Brazilian Federal District, Goiás, Mato Grosso, Mato Grosso do Sul, Minas Gerais, Paraná, Rio Grande do Sul and São Paulo. This species reaches a total length of 21 cm (8.3 in) and is believed to be a facultative air-breather. The specific name, ancistroides, refers to the resemblance of this species to some species in the genus Ancistrus.
