= Rhinotocinclus hardmani =

Conservation status
- Vulnerable (IUCN 3.1)

Scientific classification
- Kingdom: Animalia
- Phylum: Chordata
- Class: Actinopterygii
- Order: Siluriformes
- Family: Loricariidae
- Genus: Rhinotocinclus
- Species: R. hardmani

Binomial name
- Rhinotocinclus hardmani (Lehmann A., Lujan & Reis, 2022)

Synonyms
- Parotocinclus hardmani Lehmann A., Lujan & Reis, 2022

Species of fish

Rhinotocinclus hardmani is a species of freshwater ray-finned fish belonging to the family Loricariidae, the suckermouth armoured catfishes, and the subfamily Hypoptopomatinae, the cascudinhos. This catfish is endemic to Guyana.

== Taxonomy ==
Rhinotocinclus hardmani was described in February of 2022 by the ichthyologistsPablo César Lehmann Albornoz, Nathan K. Lujan and Roberto Esser dos Reis on the basis of its distinctive morphology. It is believed to be closely related to its congeners Rhinotocinclus collinsae and R. halbothi. Its type locality was given as the Kuribrong River at Grass Shoals Rapids, Potaro-Siparuni, at 5°28'44.7"N, 59°31'54.4"W, Guyana. In July 2022, it was determined that Parotocinclus hardmani and multiple other species from the genera Parotocinclus, Curculionichthys, and Hisonotus should be classified in a different genus altogether, designated as Rhinotocinclus, although many sources do not yet follow this classification. Eschmeyer's Catalog of Fishes classified the genus Rhinotocinclus in the subfamily Hypoptopomatinae, the cascudinhos, within the suckermouth armored catfish family Loricariidae.

== Etymology ==
Rhinotocinclus hardmani is classified in the genus Rhinotocinclus, this name combines rhinos, which is the genitive of rhis, meaning "beak" or "snout", an allusion to the "conspicuous and elegant" snout of the type species, with the name of the related genus Otocinclus. The specific name, honours the British ichthyologist Michael Hardman, a former technician at the Center for Biodiversity, Illinois Natural History Survey in Champaign, Illinois, USA, who collected specimens in 1998 and first recognized this species was undescribed.

== Description ==
The species reaches at least 2.43 cm (0.96 in) in standard length. It can be told apart from related species found in the northeastern and southeastern coastal rivers of Brazil by having the canal cheek plate elongated rearwards on the lower surface of the head and in touching the cleithrum. It is identifiable from related species in the Amazon, Orinoco and Guianas watersheds by being the only species with a clearly elongated, conical urogenital papilla which is double the size of the anal tube and 3 or 4 times larger than that in related species, the central abdominal area is mostly devoid of plates, the mature males lackg a dermal flap on the upper surface of the first ray of the pelvic fin, and it has a a rudimentary adipose fin joined to the dorsal plates, without a membrane, a feature shared only with R. halbothi'.

== Distribution and habitat ==
Rhinotocinclus hardmani is known from a total of seven localities in tributaries of the Potaro River downstream of the Guiana Shield escarpment in the Potaro-Siparuni Region of Guyana. The species is reported altitudes between 350 and 400m. The specimens collected have been taken in streams near waterfalls or rapids, where there are stones. It lives in blackwater steams in forested areas.
