= Rhamdia zongolicensis =

Conservation status
- Vulnerable (IUCN 3.1)

Scientific classification
- Kingdom: Animalia
- Phylum: Chordata
- Class: Actinopterygii
- Order: Siluriformes
- Family: Heptapteridae
- Genus: Rhamdia
- Species: R. zongolicensis

Binomial name
- Rhamdia zongolicensis Wilkens, 1993

Species of fish

Rhamdia zongolicensis (common name: Zongolica catfish) is a species of three-barbeled catfish endemic to Mexico. Its specific name refers to Zongolica, the area in Veracruz state where it occurs. It is a cave fish similar to Rhamdia laticauda and Rhamdia reddelli, and at times considered a junior synonym of the former.

== Habitat ==
Rhamdia zongolicensis is only known to occur in a single cave, Cueva del Túnel (Cueva del Ostoc), where it lives in stagnant pools.

== Description ==
Rhamdia zongolicensis grows to at least about 15 cm (5.9 in) standard length. It is related to the surface-dwelling Rhamdia laticauda, considered to be its sister species. Because the surface species is nocturnal, and thereby adapted to darkness, the cave species shows only few new adaptations: elongated barbels and extreme ability to withstand starvation (at least seven months under experimental conditions). It also shows reduced pigmentation and smaller eyes.

Rhamdia zongolicensis is morphologically indistinguishable from Rhamdia reddelli. This is interpreted as resulting from convergent evolution.

Rhamdia zongolicensis is only known from Zongolica in Veracruz, Mexico
