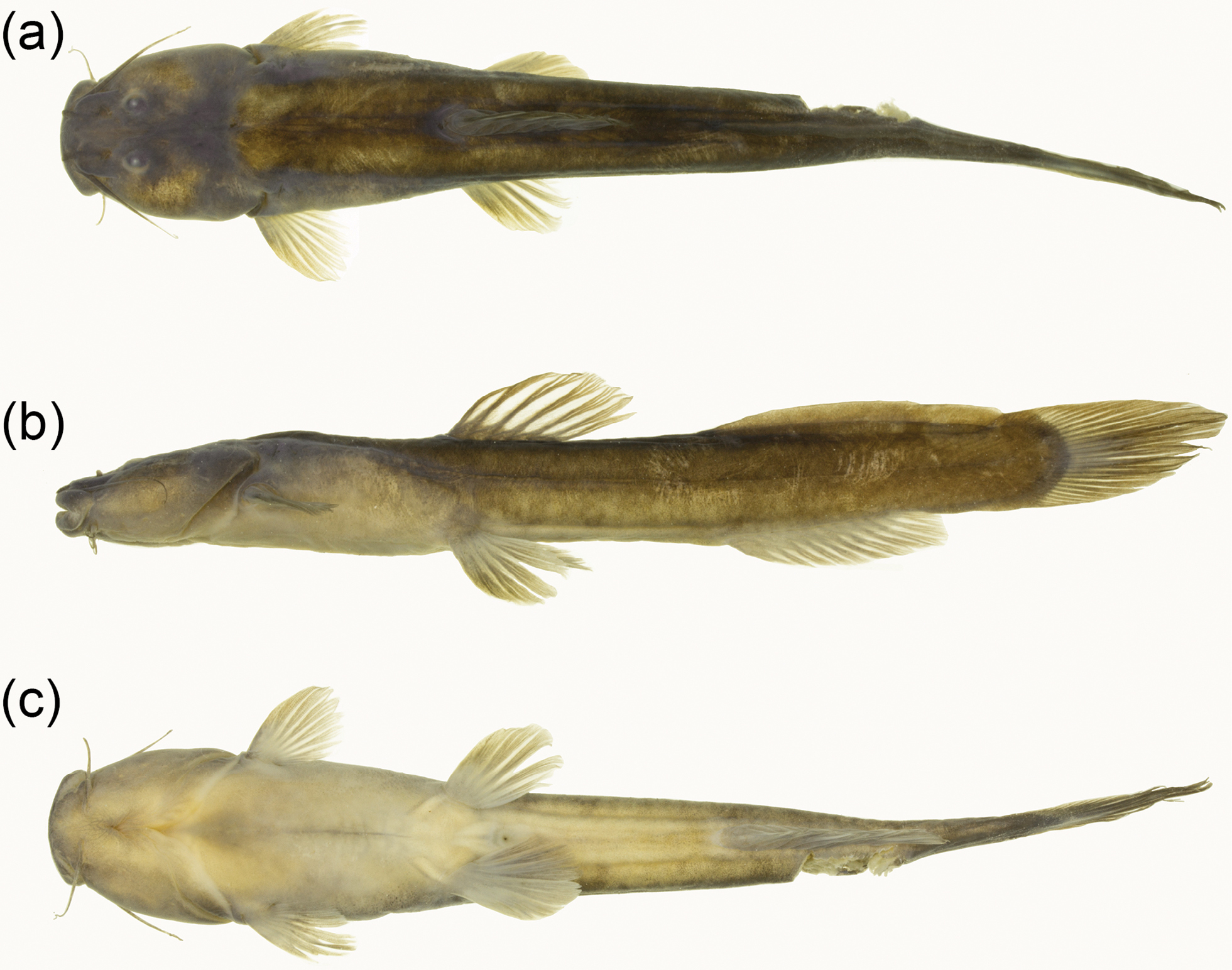

Scientific classification
- Kingdom: Animalia
- Phylum: Chordata
- Class: Actinopterygii
- Order: Siluriformes
- Family: Heptapteridae
- Genus: Heptapterus
- Species: H. carmelitanorum

Binomial name
- Heptapterus carmelitanorum Deprá, Aguilera, Faustino-Fuster, Katz & Azevedo-Santos, 2022

= Heptapterus carmelitanorum =

Species of catfish

Heptapterus carmelitanorum is a species of three-barbed catfish in the family Heptapteridae, endemic to the upper basin of the Rio Paraná system in Brazil.

== Description and distinguishing features ==
Heptapterus carmelitanorum can be distinguished from its congeners by a combination of morphological characteristics. The maximum recorded length is 14.43 cm for male specimens.

Notable features include:

- Anal-fin insertion less than one eye diameter posterior to a vertical through the adipose-fin insertion, which is unlike most congeners where it is more than one eye diameter.
- Isognathous mouth (upper and lower jaws of equal length) vs slightly to moderately retrognathous in most other species.
- A shallow keel formed by ventral procurrent caudal-fin rays, far from reaching the anal-fin base (vs deep keel in other species).

== Distribution and habitat ==
Heptapterus carmelitanorum is endemic to Brazil, specifically the upper Rio Paraná basin. It also lives in the Grande River drainage into the Sapucaí River tributary within the Minas Gerais state. It is a demersal species living in freshwater stream environments. Instances have been found living at ~830 m elevation.
