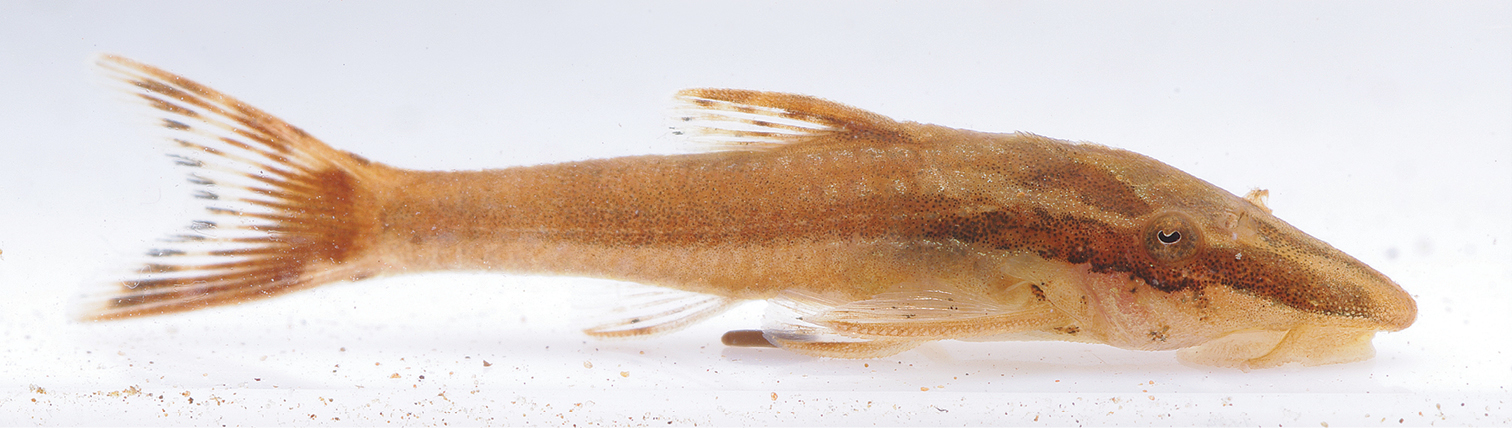

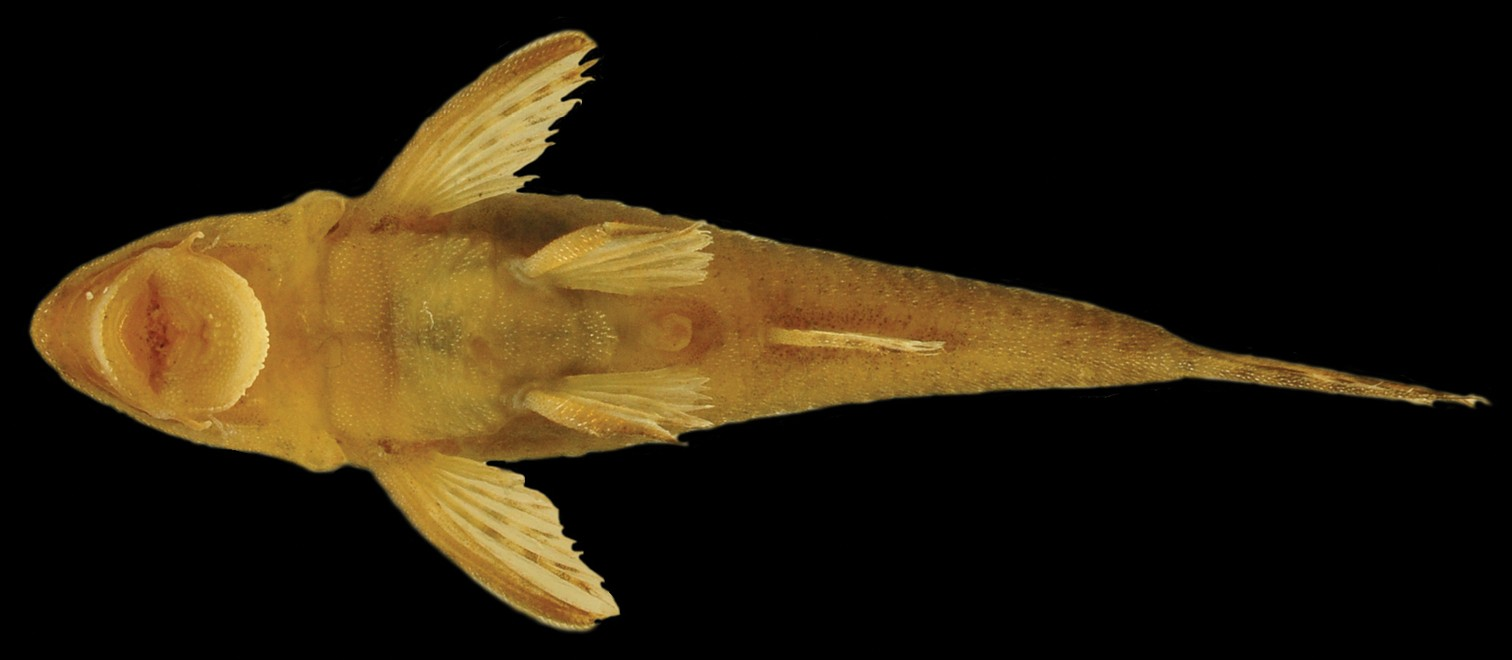

Scientific classification
- Kingdom: Animalia
- Phylum: Chordata
- Class: Actinopterygii
- Order: Siluriformes
- Family: Loricariidae
- Genus: Rhinotocinclus
- Species: R. acuen

Binomial name
- Rhinotocinclus acuen Silva, Roxo & de Oliveira, 2014
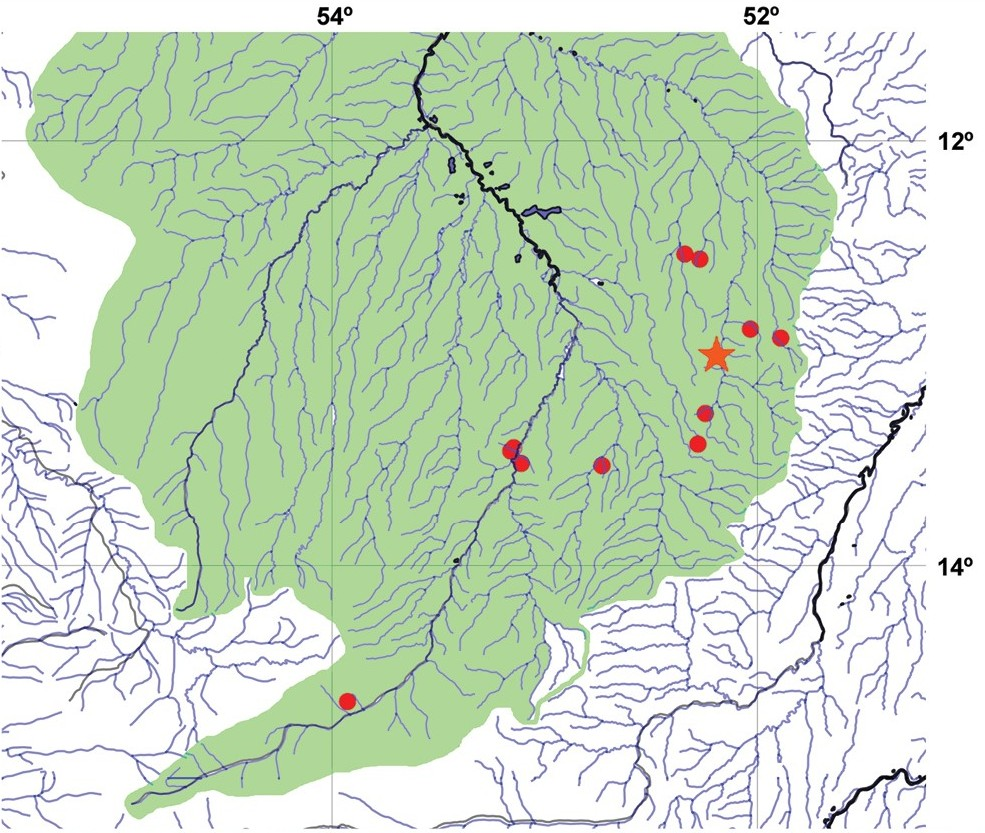
- Range map for H. acuen

Synonyms
- Hisonotus acuen

= Rhinotocinclus acuen =

Species of fish

Rhinotocinclus acuen is a species of freshwater ray-finned fish belonging to the family Loricariidae, the suckermouth armoured catfishes, and the subfamily Hypoptopomatinae, the cascudinhos. This catfish is endemic to Brazil.

== Taxonomy ==
Rhinotocinclus acuen was first formally described in 2014 by the Brazilian ichthyologists Gabriel de Souza da Costa e Silva, Fábio Fernandes Roxo and Claudio de Oliveira with its type locality given as the municipality of Querência in the Xingu River basin, at 13°00'26"S, 52°11'27"W, in the Brazilian state of Mato Grosso. Eschmeyer's Catalog of Fishes classified the genus Rhinotocinclus in the subfamily Hypoptopomatinae, the cascudinhos, within the suckermouth armored catfish family Loricariidae.

== Etymology ==
Rhinotocinclus acuen is classified in the genus Rhinotocinclus, this name combines rhinos, which is the genitive of rhis, meaning "beak" or "snout", an allusion to the "conspicuous and elegant" snout of the type species, with the name of the related genus Otocinclus. The specific name is taken from "acuen", the name used in anthropological literature to refer to the indigenous Xavante people.

== Description ==
The species bears a resemblance to R. chromodontus, being distinguished by the yellow as opposed to reddish-brown color of its teeth and the transparency of the tail fin.

H. acuen grows to a maximum length of 29 millimetres (1.1 in). The head is rounded, with small eyes and round lips.

General body coloration is light brown on the dorsal and yellowish on the ventral surface, the two colors being divided by a brown stripe that runs from the snout to the caudal peduncle. The fins are transparent with brown dots on the rays. The tail fin is transparent except for a dark spot at the base.

Males have a genital papilla, a feature missing in females.

Features can vary widely among populations, with the most variation occurring in the body's depth at the dorsal fin and in the snout and abdomen length.

== Range and habitat ==
R. acuen is found in small streams that are part of the Xingu River basin in Matto Grosso, Brazil. Individuals are usually found in shallow, slow flowing water. Streams they inhabit are usually flat-bottomed and clear, with vegetation covering the streambed.
