= Heptapterus carnatus =

Scientific classification
- Kingdom: Animalia
- Phylum: Chordata
- Class: Actinopterygii
- Division: Teleostei
- Order: Siluriformes
- Family: Heptapteridae
- Genus: Heptapterus
- Species: H. carnatus

Binomial name
- Heptapterus carnatus Faustino‐Fuster, Bockmann & Malabarba, 2019

Species of catfish

Heptapterus carnatus is a species of three-barbed catfish in the family Heptapteridae and is native to freshwater systems of southeastern Brazil.

== Description ==
Heptapterus carnatus is characterized by a robust, moderately elongate body with a rounded snout and small eyes. The head is depressed and broader than long, and the mouth is terminal with three pairs of barbels (one maxillary and two mandibular pairs). The body coloration is pale to yellowish with darker dorsal shading and faint mottling. Diagnostic features distinguishing H. carnatus from congeners include:

- A relatively deep body (vs. more slender congeners such as H. mustelinus).
- Adipose fin beginning posterior to the dorsal fin, extending nearly to the caudal base.
- Anal-fin base short, positioned beneath the posterior half of the adipose fin.
- Distinctively shaped caudal peduncle that is slightly compressed.

The maximum recorded standard length is approximately 11.4 cm for unsexed specimens.
