= Corydoras narcissus =

Conservation status
- Data Deficient (IUCN 3.1)

Scientific classification
- Kingdom: Animalia
- Phylum: Chordata
- Class: Actinopterygii
- Order: Siluriformes
- Family: Callichthyidae
- Genus: Corydoras
- Species: C. narcissus

Binomial name
- Corydoras narcissus Nijssen & Isbrücker, 1980

Species of fish

Corydoras narcissus, commonly known as the long nosed arched cory, is a species of freshwater ray-finned fish belonging to the subfamily Corydoradinae, the corys, of the family Callichthyidae, the armoured catfishes. This catfish is found in the Madeira and Purus river basins in Amazonian Brazil. It has a longer, more concave ("saddle-shaped") nose, but its color pattern resembles that also seen in a few other Corydoras species (for example, C. arcuatus, C. bethanae, C. granti and C. urucu) from the western Amazon basin, as well as Brachyrhamdia thayeria; they all have spiny fins with a (to humans) painful but not dangerous venom and their similarity is an example of Müllerian mimicry. C. narcissus generally is an uncommon species in its range.

C. narcissus is large for a Corydoras and may reach up to 6.5 cm (2.6 in) in standard length. It feeds on worms, small crustaceans, insects, and plant matter. It lays eggs in dense vegetation, and adults do not guard the eggs. Unlike most Corydoras species but similar to the other "saddlenoses", C. narcissus tend to occur in small groups (not larger groups) and especially during the breeding period mature males are quite aggressive towards each other.

The species was first collected by Herbert R. Axelrod and Martin R. Brittan. It was first described and named narcissus by Han Nijssen and Isaäc J. H. Isbrücker to recognize the collectors "for their many naming suggestions".

== See also ==
- List of freshwater aquarium fish species
