= Cetopsorhamdia filamentosa =

Conservation status
- Data Deficient (IUCN 3.1)

Scientific classification
- Kingdom: Animalia
- Phylum: Chordata
- Class: Actinopterygii
- Order: Siluriformes
- Family: Heptapteridae
- Genus: Cetopsorhamdia
- Species: C. filamentosa

Binomial name
- Cetopsorhamdia filamentosa Fowler, 1945

Species of fish

Cetopsorhamdia filamentosa is a species of three-barbeled catfishes native to the Tulumayo River basin in the upper Ucayali River drainage, Peru. This species reaches a length of 2.9 cm (1.1 in) TL.
