= Cetopsorhamdia iheringi =

Conservation status
- Least Concern (IUCN 3.1)

Scientific classification
- Kingdom: Animalia
- Phylum: Chordata
- Class: Actinopterygii
- Order: Siluriformes
- Family: Heptapteridae
- Genus: Cetopsorhamdia
- Species: C. iheringi

Binomial name
- Cetopsorhamdia iheringi Schubart & A. L. Gomes, 1959

Species of fish

Cetopsorhamdia iheringi is a species of three-barbeled catfishes native to the upper reaches of the Paraná and São Francisco River basins in Brazil. This species reaches a length of 11.1 cm (4.4 in) SL.

== Etymology ==
The fish is named in honor of Rodolpho von Ihering (1883–1939), the founder of the Estação Experimental de Biologia e Piscicultura in Piraçununga, Brazil, who was a pioneer in the study and the culture of Brazilian freshwater fishes.
