= Pimelodella yaharo =

Scientific classification
- Domain: Eukaryota
- Kingdom: Animalia
- Phylum: Chordata
- Class: Actinopterygii
- Order: Siluriformes
- Family: Heptapteridae
- Genus: Pimelodella
- Species: P. yaharo

Binomial name
- Pimelodella yaharo Conde-Saldaña, Albornoz-Garzón, García-Melo, Dergam& Villa-Navarro, 2019

Species of fish

Pimelodella yaharo is a species of three-barbeled catfish belonging to the family Heptapteridae. It is native to the freshwater systems of South America, specifically the Sierra Nevada de Santa Marta in Colombia.

The species was first described by Cristhian C. Conde-Saldaña, Juan G. Albornoz-Garzón, Jorge E. Garcí-Melo, Jorge A. Dergam, and Francisco A. Villa-Navarro in 2019.

== Description ==
Pimelodella yaharo is characterized by its elongated body and three distinctive barbels around its mouth. The coloration of this species is typically dark brown with lighter spots, providing camouflage in its natural habitat.

== Habitat and distribution ==
This species is found in the freshwater streams and rivers of the Sierra Nevada de Santa Marta region. It prefers environments with clear, oxygen-rich waters and a substrate composed of rocks and gravel.

== Behavior and diet ==
Pimelodella yaharo is a nocturnal predator, feeding primarily on small insects, crustaceans, and other aquatic invertebrates. It uses its barbels to detect food in the substrate and is known for its opportunistic feeding habits.

== Reproduction ==
The reproductive habits of Pimelodella yaharo are not well-documented. However, it is believed to exhibit similar breeding behaviors to other members of the Heptapteridae family, such as laying eggs in secluded areas with some degree of parental care.

== Conservation status ==
The conservation status of Pimelodella yaharo has not been extensively studied. Due to its limited distribution, the species may be vulnerable to habitat degradation and changes in water quality. Conservation efforts are needed to ensure its long-term survival.

== Human interaction ==
Pimelodella yaharo is not commonly targeted by local fishermen and is primarily of interest to researchers and aquarists. Its presence in the aquarium trade is limited due to its specific habitat requirements.

== Research and studies ==
Further research is needed to fully understand the ecology, behavior, and conservation needs of Pimelodella yaharo. Efforts to study its population dynamics and habitat preferences are crucial for ensuring its long-term survival.

== Etymology ==
Yaharo is the pre-conquest name of present-day Dibulla (Sierra Nevada de Santa Marta, Colombia), which is the type locality.
