= Pariolius maldonadoi =

Scientific classification
- Kingdom: Animalia
- Phylum: Chordata
- Class: Actinopterygii
- Order: Siluriformes
- Family: Heptapteridae
- Genus: Pariolius
- Species: P. maldonadoi

Binomial name
- Pariolius maldonadoi Faustino-Fuster, D. R., López-Castaño, J. A., Quiñones, J. M. & Meza-Vargas, V., 2024

Species of fishes

Pariolius maldonadoi is a species of three-barbeled catfish found in the small creeks and tributaries of the Upper Orinoco and Negro Rivers in Colombia.

This species grows to a length of 3.2 centimetres (1.3 in) SL, and inhabits sand and gravel bottoms of creeks of relatively fast flowing water as well as sluggish waters of the same streams where aquatic vegetation is lacking.

It feeds mainly on Trichoptera larvae.

== Etymology ==
The fish's name is in memoriam to Javier Maldonado-Ocampo, professor of the Pontificia Universidad Javeriana in Bogotá, Colombia for his contributions and his devotion to Colombian and neotropical ichthyology.
