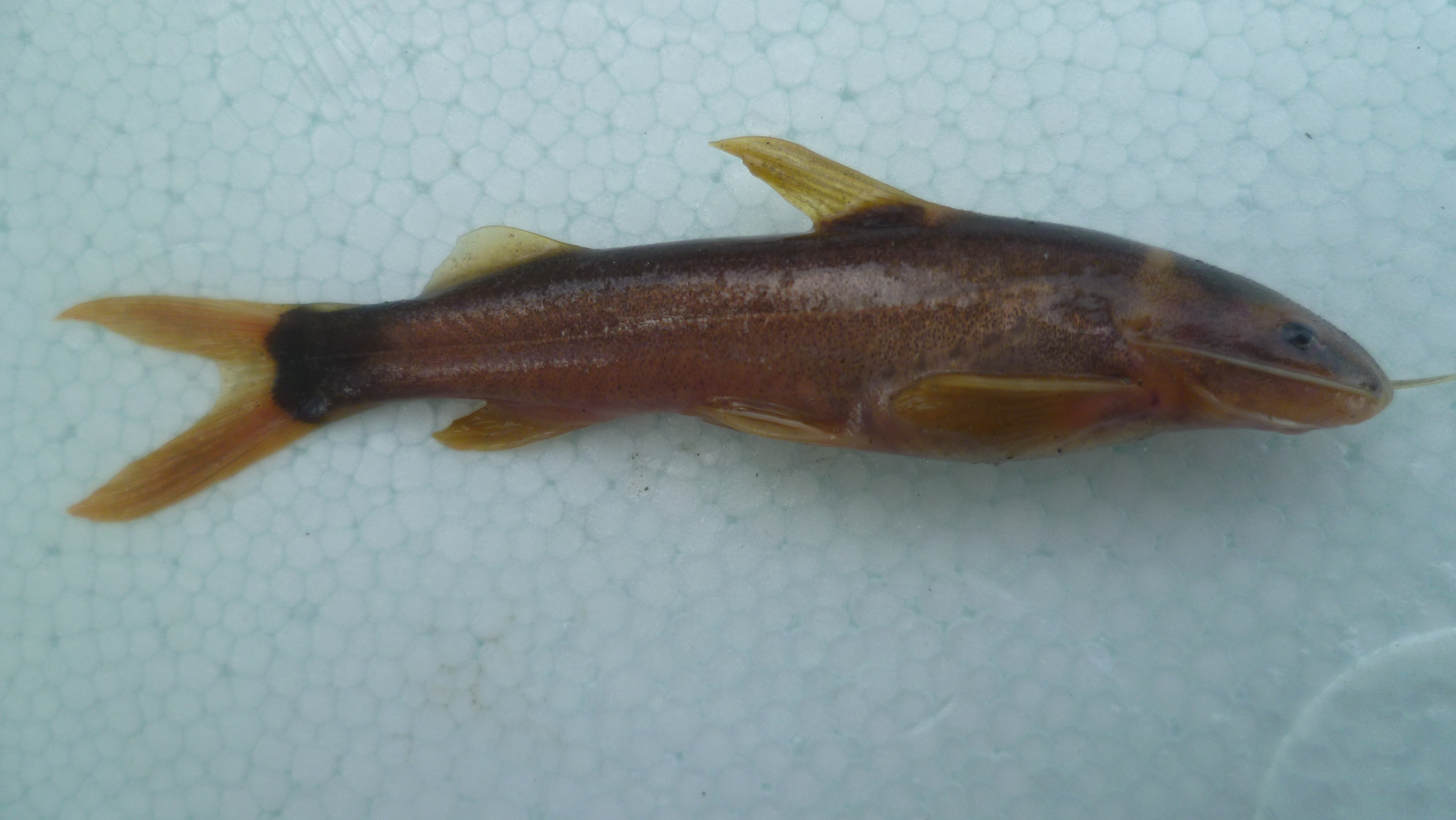

Conservation status
- Least Concern (IUCN 3.1)

Scientific classification
- Kingdom: Animalia
- Phylum: Chordata
- Class: Actinopterygii
- Order: Siluriformes
- Family: Heptapteridae
- Genus: Cetopsorhamdia
- Species: C. nasus

Binomial name
- Cetopsorhamdia nasus C. H. Eigenmann & Fisher, 1916

= Cetopsorhamdia nasus =

Species of fish

Cetopsorhamdia nasus is a species of three-barbeled catfishes native to the Magdalena River basin in Colombia. This species reaches a length of 10.3 cm (4.1 in).
