= Cetopsorhamdia hidalgoi =

Scientific classification
- Kingdom: Animalia
- Phylum: Chordata
- Class: Actinopterygii
- Order: Siluriformes
- Family: Heptapteridae
- Genus: Cetopsorhamdia
- Species: C. hidalgoi

Binomial name
- Cetopsorhamdia hidalgoi Dario R. Faustino-Fuster & Lesley S. de Souza, 2021

Species of fish

Cetopsorhamdia hidalgoi is a species of three-barbeled catfishes native to the upper Amazon in Peru.

== Etymology ==
The fish is named in honor of Max Hidalgo, the curator of the Ichthyology Department at the Museo de Historia Natural in the Universidad Nacional Mayor de San Marcos, because of his devotion and dedication to Peruvian ichthyology; he collected the holotype and many other specimens of the type series on expeditions that led to the creation of multiple conservation areas in Peru.
