= Cetopsorhamdia molinae =

Scientific classification
- Kingdom: Animalia
- Phylum: Chordata
- Class: Actinopterygii
- Order: Siluriformes
- Family: Heptapteridae
- Genus: Cetopsorhamdia
- Species: C. molinae

Binomial name
- Cetopsorhamdia molinae Miles, 1943

Species of fish

Cetopsorhamdia molinae is a species of three-barbeled catfishes found in the Magdalena, Orinoco, and Tocantins River basins in South America. This species reaches a length of 3.6 cm (1.4 in) SL.

== Etymology ==
The fish is named in honor of Ciro Molina Garcés (1891–1953), the Secretary of Agriculture and Development in the Valle del Cauca, for his understanding the value of systematic research in all branches of the sciences to the state and national economies of Colombia.
