= Cetopsorhamdia picklei =

Scientific classification
- Kingdom: Animalia
- Phylum: Chordata
- Class: Actinopterygii
- Order: Siluriformes
- Family: Heptapteridae
- Genus: Cetopsorhamdia
- Species: C. picklei

Binomial name
- Cetopsorhamdia picklei L. P. Schultz, 1944

Species of fish

Cetopsorhamdia pickle, the Andean barred catfish, is a species of three-barbeled catfishes native to Maracaibo Lake basin, Venezuela. This species reaches a length of 12.0 cm (4.7 in) SL.

== Etymology ==
The fish is named in honor of Chesley B. Pickle of the Lago Petroleum Corporation, who facilitated Schultz in the collection of fishes at the southern end of Lago Maracaibo, Venezuela.
