= Pimelodella altipinnis =

Conservation status
- Data Deficient (IUCN 3.1)

Scientific classification
- Kingdom: Animalia
- Phylum: Chordata
- Class: Actinopterygii
- Order: Siluriformes
- Family: Heptapteridae
- Genus: Pimelodella
- Species: P. altipinnis

Binomial name
- Pimelodella altipinnis (Steindachner, 1864)

Synonyms
- Pimelodus altipinnis Steindachner, 1864

Species of fish

Pimelodella altipinnis is a species of three-barbeled catfish of the family Heptapteridae. It is endemic to the Essequibo River basin in Guyana.

== Description ==
This species reaches a standard length of 6.4 cm (2.5 in).
