= Pimelodella brasiliensis =

Conservation status
- Data Deficient (IUCN 3.1)

Scientific classification
- Kingdom: Animalia
- Phylum: Chordata
- Class: Actinopterygii
- Order: Siluriformes
- Family: Heptapteridae
- Genus: Pimelodella
- Species: P. brasiliensis

Binomial name
- Pimelodella brasiliensis (Steindachner, 1877)

Synonyms
- Pimelodus brasiliensis Steindachner, 1877

Species of fish

Pimelodella brasiliensis is a species of three-barbeled catfish of the family Heptapteridae. It is endemic to the Paraíba do Sul river basin in Brazil, although there are unconfirmed records from elsewhere.

== Description ==
This species reaches a total length of 18.0 cm (7.1 in).
