= Heptapterus bleekeri =

Scientific classification
- Kingdom: Animalia
- Phylum: Chordata
- Class: Actinopterygii
- Order: Siluriformes
- Family: Heptapteridae
- Genus: Heptapterus
- Species: H. bleekeri

Binomial name
- Heptapterus bleekeri Boeseman, 1953

Synonyms
- Chasmocranus bleekeri

Species of catfish

Heptapterus bleekeri, alternatively referred to as Chasmocranus bleekeri, is a species of catfish in the family Heptapteridae. It is native to freshwater systems of northern South America.

== Description ==
Heptapterus bleekeri is a small, slender-bodied freshwater catfish. It reaches a standard length of approximately 15.5 cm, with a maximum total length near 20 cm.

== Distribution and habitat ==
The species is native to Suriname, French Guiana, and Brazil (Amapá). Its type locality is a brooklet in the Maroni River basin, on the eastern slopes of the Nassau Mountains in Suriname. It inhabits small freshwater streams and clear-water environments within these lowland basins.
