= Pariolius armillatus =

Conservation status
- Least Concern (IUCN 3.1)

Scientific classification
- Kingdom: Animalia
- Phylum: Chordata
- Class: Actinopterygii
- Order: Siluriformes
- Family: Heptapteridae
- Genus: Pariolius
- Species: P. armillatus

Binomial name
- Pariolius armillatus Cope, 1872

Species of fish

Pariolius armillatus is a species of three-barbeled catfish native to the upper Amazon basin of Brazil and Peru. This species grows to a length of 3.2 centimetres (1.3 in) SL and inhabits sand and gravel bottoms of creeks of relatively fast flowing water as well as sluggish waters of the same streams where aquatic vegetation is lacking. It feeds mainly on Trichoptera larvae.
