= Cetopsorhamdia insidiosa =

Scientific classification
- Kingdom: Animalia
- Phylum: Chordata
- Class: Actinopterygii
- Order: Siluriformes
- Family: Heptapteridae
- Genus: Cetopsorhamdia
- Species: C. insidiosa

Binomial name
- Cetopsorhamdia insidiosa Steindachner, 1915

Synonyms
- Cetopsorhamdia insidiosus (Steindachner, 1915); Imparfinis insidiosus Steindachner, 1915

Species of fish

Cetopsorhamdia insidiosa is a species of three-barbeled catfish native to the Branco River basin in Brazil. This species reaches a length of 7.7 cm (3.0 in) SL.
