= Cetopsorhamdia orinoco =

Conservation status
- Least Concern (IUCN 3.1)

Scientific classification
- Kingdom: Animalia
- Phylum: Chordata
- Class: Actinopterygii
- Order: Siluriformes
- Family: Heptapteridae
- Genus: Cetopsorhamdia
- Species: C. orinoco

Binomial name
- Cetopsorhamdia orinoco L. P. Schultz, 1944

Species of fish

Cetopsorhamdia orinoco is a species of three-barbeled catfishes native to the Napo River basin in Ecuador and Orinoco River basin in Venezuela. This species reaches a length of 5.4 cm (2.1 in) SL.

== Etymology ==
The fish is named for the Río Orinoco system.
