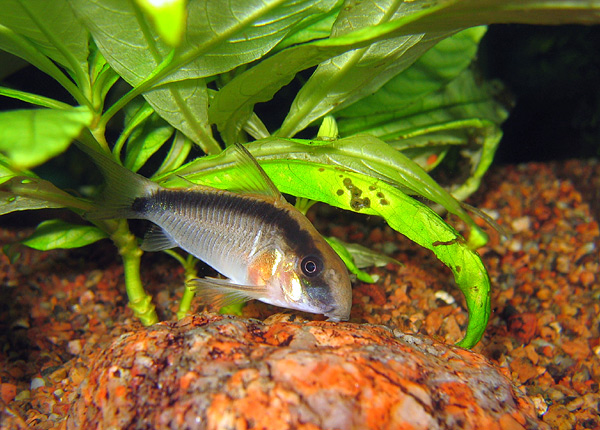
- Hoplisoma granti (similar to and often confused with B. arcuata)

Conservation status
- Least Concern (IUCN 3.1)

Scientific classification
- Kingdom: Animalia
- Phylum: Chordata
- Class: Actinopterygii
- Order: Siluriformes
- Family: Callichthyidae
- Genus: Brochis
- Species: B. arcuata

Binomial name
- Brochis arcuata (Elwin, 1938)

Synonyms
- Corydoras arcuatus Elwin, 1938

= Brochis arcuata =

Species of fish

Brochis arcuata is a species of freshwater ray-finned fish belonging the family Callichthyidae, the armored catfishes, and the subfamily Corydoradinae, the corys. It is restricted to the western Amazon basin, where it is only known from small blackwater or clearwater streams in the middle Juruá River basin, the Javari River basin and streams near Leticia in western Brazil, far northeastern Peru and far southeastern Colombia.

The separation of B. arcuata and Hoplisoma granti was only fully clarified in 2019; information published for "B. arcuata" before this was almost invariably for H. granti. Similarly, the common name skunk corydoras has often been used for B. arcuata, but the vast majority of skunk corydoras in the aquarium trade are actually H. granti (leading several authorities to transfer the common name skunk corydoras to H. granti). The two species are very similar and locally they occur together, with both being restricted to the western Amazon basin, but H. granti is more widespread. In addition to these two, a few other Corydoradinae species (for example, B. bethanae, C. narcissus and H. urucu) from the western Amazon basin have similar color patterns, as does Brachyrhamdia thayeria; they all have spiny fins with a (to humans) painful but not dangerous venom, and their similarity is an example of Müllerian mimicry.
