= Cetopsorhamdia phantasia =

Scientific classification
- Kingdom: Animalia
- Phylum: Chordata
- Class: Actinopterygii
- Order: Siluriformes
- Family: Heptapteridae
- Genus: Cetopsorhamdia
- Species: C. phantasia

Binomial name
- Cetopsorhamdia phantasia D. J. Stewart, 1985

Species of fish

Cetopsorhamdia phantasia is a species of three-barbeled catfishes native to the Napo River basin in Ecuador. This species reaches a length of 4.0 cm (1.6 in) SL.
