= Cetopsorhamdia boquillae =

Conservation status
- Least Concern (IUCN 3.1)

Scientific classification
- Kingdom: Animalia
- Phylum: Chordata
- Class: Actinopterygii
- Order: Siluriformes
- Family: Heptapteridae
- Genus: Cetopsorhamdia
- Species: C. boquillae

Binomial name
- Cetopsorhamdia boquillae C. H. Eigenmann, 1922

Species of fish

Cetopsorhamdia boquillae is a species of three-barbeled catfishes native to the Cauca River basin in the Magdalena River basin in Colombia. This species reaches a length of 7.2 cm (2.8 in) SL.
