= Pariolius pax =

Scientific classification
- Kingdom: Animalia
- Phylum: Chordata
- Class: Actinopterygii
- Order: Siluriformes
- Family: Heptapteridae
- Genus: Pariolius
- Species: P. pax

Binomial name
- Pariolius pax Faustino-Fuster, D. R., López-Castaño, J. A., Quiñones, J. M. & Meza-Vargas, V., 2024

Species of fishes

Pariolius pax is a species of three-barbeled catfish found only in small creeks and tributaries of the upper Orinoco River basin. This species grows to a length of 3.2 centimetres (1.3 in) SL and inhabits sand and gravel bottoms of creeks of relatively fast flowing water as well as sluggish waters of the same streams where aquatic vegetation is lacking. It feeds mainly on Trichoptera larvae.

== Etymology ==
The specific epithet is Latin pax for "peace", given specifically in allusion to PAX, the peace movement from the Netherlands, which since the early 1990s has been working to protect human security, prevent armed conflicts and build societies with peace and justice in Colombia.
