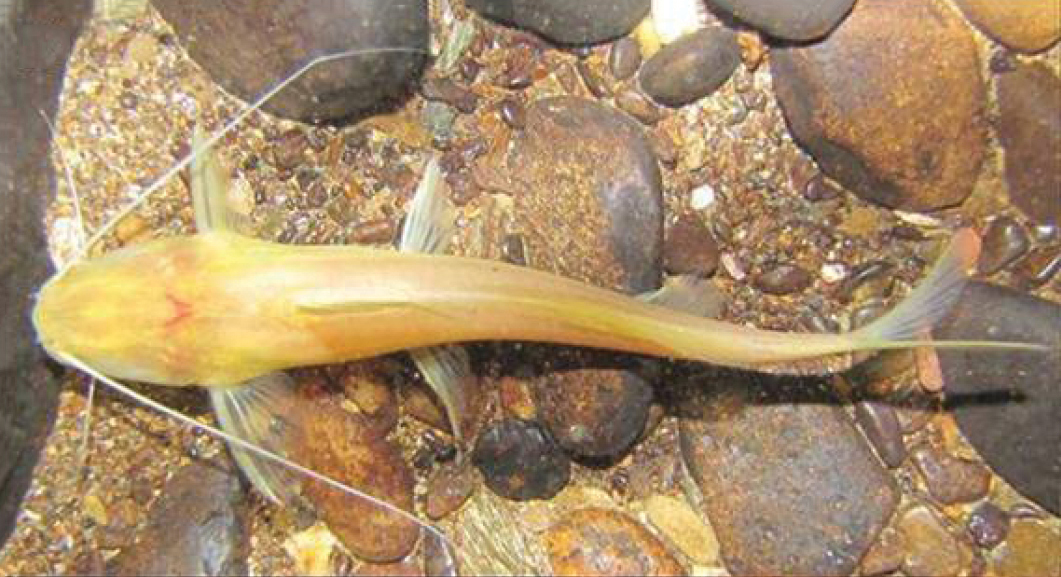

Conservation status
- Endangered (IUCN 3.1)

Scientific classification
- Kingdom: Animalia
- Phylum: Chordata
- Class: Actinopterygii
- Order: Siluriformes
- Family: Heptapteridae
- Genus: Pimelodella
- Species: P. kronei

Binomial name
- Pimelodella kronei (A. Miranda-Ribeiro, 1907)

Synonyms
- Typhlobagrus kronei Miranda Ribeiro, 1907; Caecorhamdella brasiliensis Borodin, 1927

= Pimelodella kronei =

Species of fish

Pimelodella kronei is a species of three-barbeled catfish endemic to Brazil. Discovered by the German naturalist Sigismund Ernst Richard Krone, it was the first troglobitic fish described in Brazil, but several others have been described later.

== Description ==
Pimelodella kronei is an exclusively troglobitic species endemic to cave streams along the Betari River basin, a tributary of the upper Ribeira de Iguape River. The species is adapted to the food scarcity typical of subterranean habitats and appears to be undergoing a process of losing its cryptobiotic habits—the blind catfish exhibits little or no photophobia and spends much of its time actively exploring the whole environment, not only the bottom but also the water column and the surface. As with other troglobitic fish, they are oriented toward environmental stimuli, likely interpreting them as indicators of food.

They are highly susceptible to environmental fluctuations, depending on the relative stability of the underground habitat. With a low reproduction and growth rate (growing less than 1 mm a month, but has high longevity of 15 to 20 years), they present a low capacity to replace population losses due to natural or anthropogenic causes. The increase in environmental disruption due to human activity and their low reproductive rate makes them a highly vulnerable species. This fish reaches a length of 20.2 centimetres (8.0 in) SL.
