= Rhinotocinclus longirostris =

Conservation status
- Least Concern (IUCN 3.1)

Scientific classification
- Kingdom: Animalia
- Phylum: Chordata
- Class: Actinopterygii
- Order: Siluriformes
- Family: Loricariidae
- Genus: Rhinotocinclus
- Species: R. longirostris

Binomial name
- Rhinotocinclus longirostris (Garavello, 1988)

Synonyms
- Parotocinclus longirostris Garavello, 1988

Species of fish

Rhinotocinclus longirostris is a species of freshwater ray-finned fish belonging to the family Loricariidae, the suckermouth armoured catfishes, and the subfamily Hypoptopomatinae, the cascudinhos. This catfish is endemic to Brazil.

== Taxonomy ==
Rhinotocinclus longirostris was first formally described as Parotocinclus longirostris in 2014 by the Brazilian ichthyologists Pablo César Lehmann Albornoz, Henrique Lazzarotto and Roberto Esser dos Reis with its type locality given as the Preto da Eva River, at the kilometre 80 on the Manaus-Itacoatiara highway, Manaus, in the Brazilian state of Amazonas. In 2022 it was transferred to the newly proposed genus Rhinotocinclusby Roberto Esser dos Reis and Pablo César Lehmann Albornoz, and was designated as its type species. Eschmeyer's Catalog of Fishes classified the genus Rhinotocinclus in the subfamily Hypoptopomatinae, the cascudinhos, within the suckermouth armored catfish family Loricariidae.

== Etymology ==
Rhinotocinclus longirostris is the type species of the genus Rhinotocinclus, this name combines rhinos, which is the genitive of rhis, meaning "beak" or "snout", an allusion to the "conspicuous and elegant" snout of the type species, with the name of the related genus Otocinclus. The specific name, longirostris, means "long snout", Garavello described this species shape as "strogly ellipsoid" and it is thought that the specific name refers to this.

== Description ==
Rhinotocinclus longirostris reaches a standard length of2.7 cm (1.1 in).

== Distribution and habitat ==
Rhinotocinclus longirostris is endemic to Brazil, being found in the Amazon basin, where it has been recorded in the Crespo River in the upper Madeira River basin in Rondônia, and in the Preto da Eva River basin, in Amazonas. However, it is likely that its actual distribution is wider than is currentky known. It is a demersal species which is found in streams where the vegetation is open so that sunlight can reach the water.
