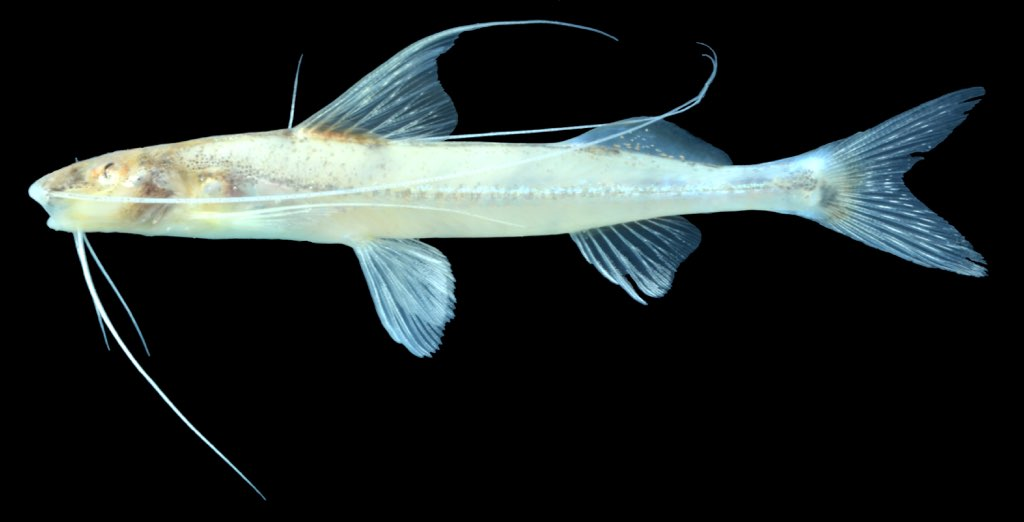
- Mastiglanis asopos

Scientific classification
- Kingdom: Animalia
- Phylum: Chordata
- Class: Actinopterygii
- Division: Teleostei
- Order: Siluriformes
- Family: Heptapteridae
- Genus: Mastiglanis; Bockmann, 1994

= Mastiglanis =

Genus of fishes

Mastiglanis is a genus of three-barbeled catfish native to South America. It was monotypic (containing one species, M. asopos) for 25 years until further congeners were discovered in 2019 and 2020.

== Species ==
There are currently three recognized species in this genus:

- Mastiglanis asopos Bockmann, 1994
- Mastiglanis durantoni de Pinna & Keith, 2019
- Mastiglanis yaguas Faustino-Fuster & Ortega, 2020
