= Taunayia bifasciata =

Scientific classification
- Domain: Eukaryota
- Kingdom: Animalia
- Phylum: Chordata
- Class: Actinopterygii
- Order: Siluriformes
- Family: Heptapteridae
- Genus: Taunayia; A. Miranda-Ribeiro, 1918
- Species: T. bifasciata

Binomial name
- Taunayia bifasciata (C. H. Eigenmann & A. A. Norris, 1900)

Synonyms
- Nannoglanis bifasciatus C. H. Eigenmann & A. A. Norris, 1900; Taunayia marginata A. Miranda Ribeiro, 1918

Species of fish

Taunayia bifasciata is a species of three-barbeled catfish endemic to Brazil where it is found in the Upper Paraíba do Sul and Tietê River basins. This species grows to a length of 14.0 centimetres (5.5 in) SL.

Although presently the only member of the genus Taunayia, an apparently undescribed, cave-adapted species is known from Campo Formoso, Bahia.
