= Brachyglanis =

Scientific classification
- Kingdom: Animalia
- Phylum: Chordata
- Class: Actinopterygii
- Order: Siluriformes
- Family: Heptapteridae
- Genus: Brachyglanis; C. H. Eigenmann, 1912

Type species
- Brachyglanis frenata C. H. Eigenmann, 1912

Species
- See text.

Genus of fishes

Brachyglanis is a genus of Three-barbeled catfishes native to South America.

== Species ==
There are currently five recognized species in this genus:

- Brachyglanis frenatus C. H. Eigenmann, 1912
- Brachyglanis magoi Fernández-Yépez, 1967
- Brachyglanis melas C. H. Eigenmann, 1912
- Brachyglanis microphthalmus Bizerril, 1991
- Brachyglanis phalacra C. H. Eigenmann, 1912
