= Horiomyzon retropinnatus =

Conservation status
- Least Concern (IUCN 3.1)

Scientific classification
- Kingdom: Animalia
- Phylum: Chordata
- Class: Actinopterygii
- Order: Siluriformes
- Family: Heptapteridae
- Genus: Horiomyzon; D. J. Stewart, 1986
- Species: H. retropinnatus

Binomial name
- Horiomyzon retropinnatus D. J. Stewart, 1986

Species of fish

Horiomyzon retropinnatus is a species of three-barbeled catfish which occurs in the Amazon and Napo Rivers of Brazil and Ecuador. This species reaches a length of 2.4 centimetres (0.94 in) SL. It is currently the only recognized species in its genus.
