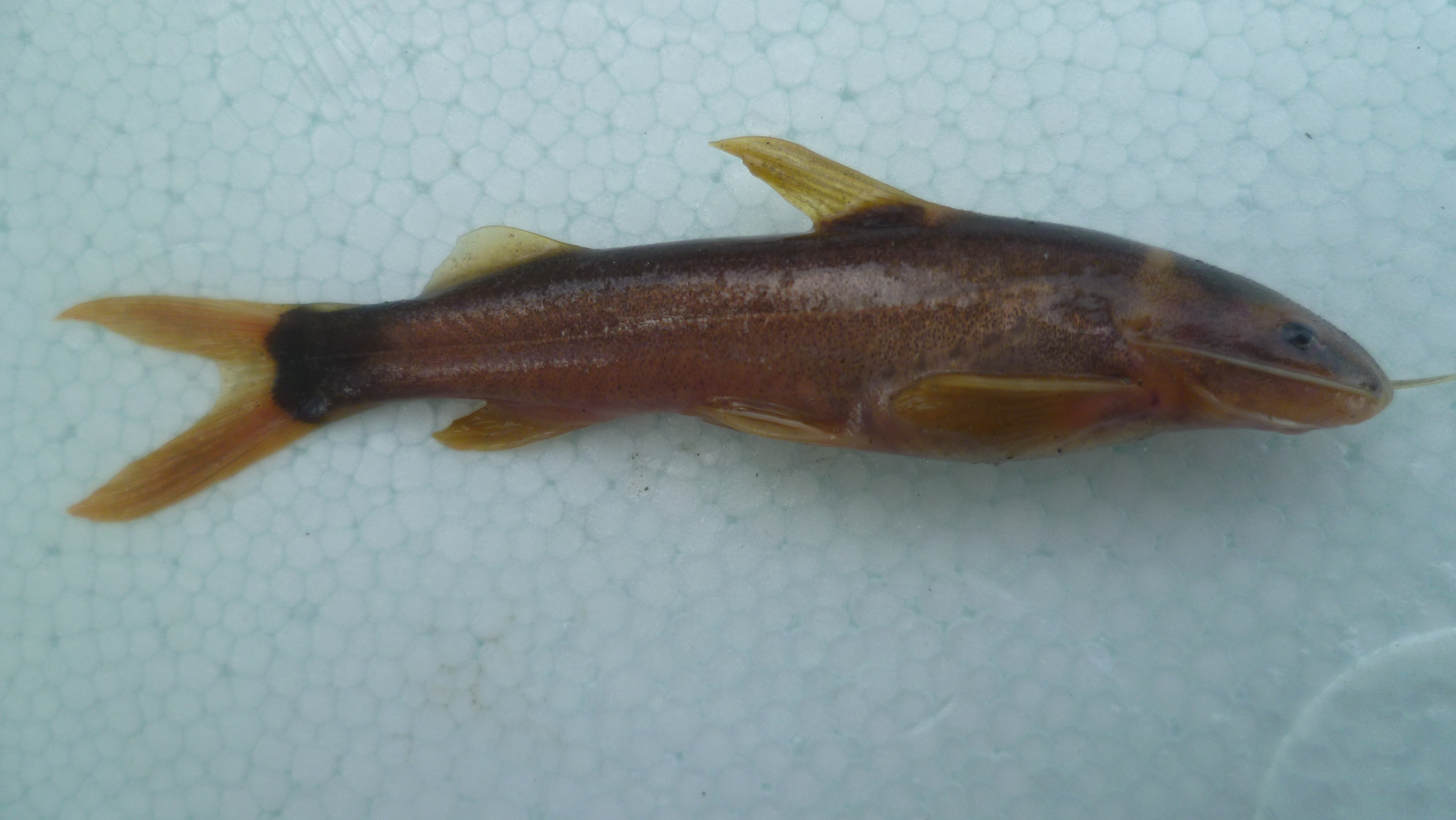
- Cetopsorhamdia nasus

Scientific classification
- Kingdom: Animalia
- Phylum: Chordata
- Class: Actinopterygii
- Order: Siluriformes
- Family: Heptapteridae
- Genus: Cetopsorhamdia; C. H. Eigenmann & Fisher, 1916

Type species
- Cetopsorhamdia nasus C. H. Eigenmann & Fisher, 1916

Species
- See text.

= Cetopsorhamdia =

Genus of fishes

Cetopsorhamdia is a genus of three-barbeled catfishes native to South America.

== Species ==
These are the currently recognized species in this genus:

- Cetopsorhamdia boquillae C. H. Eigenmann, 1922
- Cetopsorhamdia clathrata Bockmann & Reis, 2021
- Cetopsorhamdia filamentosa Fowler, 1945
- Cetopsorhamdia hidalgoi Dario R. Faustino-Fuster & Lesley S. de Souza, 2021
- Cetopsorhamdia iheringi Schubart & A. L. Gomes, 1959
- Cetopsorhamdia insidiosa (Steindachner, 1915)
- Cetopsorhamdia molinae Miles, 1943
- Cetopsorhamdia nasus C. H. Eigenmann & Fisher, 1916
- Cetopsorhamdia orinoco L. P. Schultz, 1944
- Cetopsorhamdia phantasia D. J. Stewart, 1985
- Cetopsorhamdia picklei L. P. Schultz, 1944
- Cetopsorhamdia shermani Schultz, 1944
- Cetopsorhamdia spilopleura Bockmann & Reis, 2021
