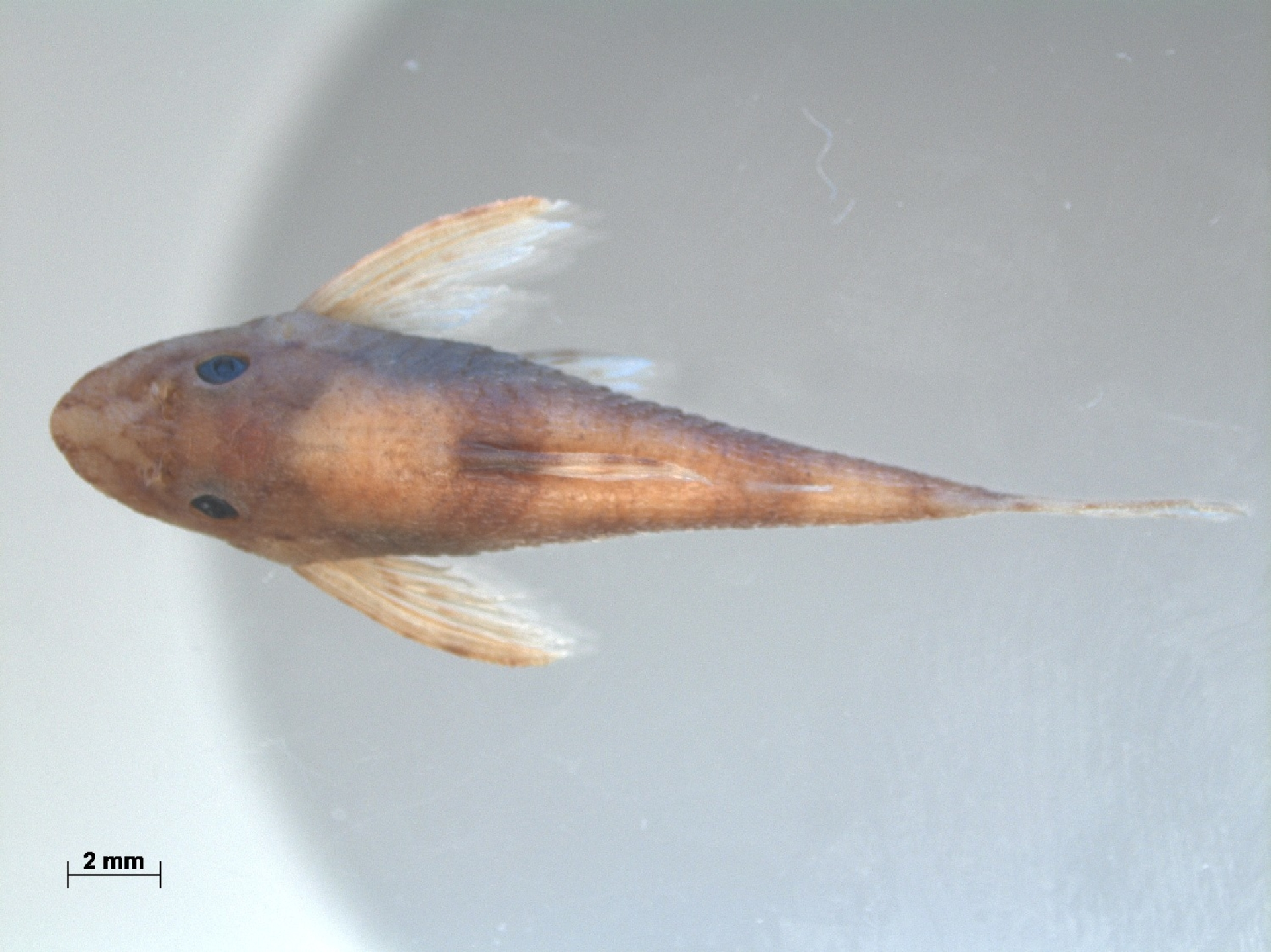

Conservation status
- Least Concern (IUCN 3.1)

Scientific classification
- Kingdom: Animalia
- Phylum: Chordata
- Class: Actinopterygii
- Order: Siluriformes
- Family: Loricariidae
- Genus: Rhinotocinclus
- Species: R. britskii

Binomial name
- Rhinotocinclus britskii (Boeseman, 1974)

Synonyms
- Parotocinclus britskii Boeseman, 1974; Parotocinclus amazonensis Garavello, 1977; Parotocinclus aripuanensis Garavello, 1988

= Rhinotocinclus britskii =

Species of fish

Rhinotocinclus britskii is a species of freshwater ray-finned fish belonging to the family Loricariidae, the suckermouth armoured catfishes, and the subfamily Hypoptopomatinae, the cascudinhos. This catfish is found in South America.

== Taxonomy ==
Rhinotocinclus britskii was first formally described as Parotocinclus britskii in 1974 by the Dutch ichthyologist Marinus Boeseman with its type locality given as a left tributary of Coppename River in Suriname at 3°51'N, 56°55'W. In 2022 it was transferred to the newly proposed genus Rhinotocinclusby Roberto Esser dos Reis and Pablo César Lehmann Albornoz. Eschmeyer's Catalog of Fishes classified the genus Rhinotocinclus in the subfamily Hypoptopomatinae, the cascudinhos, within the suckermouth armored catfish family Loricariidae.

== Etymology ==
Rhinotocinclus britskii is classified in the genus Rhinotocinclus, this name combines rhinos, which is the genitive of rhis, meaning "beak" or "snout", an allusion to the "conspicuous and elegant" snout of the type species, with the name of the related genus Otocinclus. The specific name honours the Brazilian ichthyologist Heraldo A. Britski in gratitude for his assistance and hospitality when Boeseman visited the University of São Paulo's zoological museum.

== Description ==
Rhinotocinclus britskii can be told apart from other species in the genus Rhinotocinclus by the following combination of characters: the possession of between 21 and 31 premaxillary and mandibular teeth, normally 24-25; the upper surface of the snout has a wide and moderately parabolic profile, and the snout is not sharply pointed; the head is 75-98% as wide as it is long which is equivalent to 18-22% of the standard length, abdomen has its middle series of plates irregularly arranged; there are 5 pigmented blotches on pectoral fin spine while on the anal fin there are two blotches on the unbranched ray and a single band on the branched ray. The body is elongated and reaches a total length of 6 cm (2.4 in).

== Distribution and habitat ==
Rhinotocinclus britskii is found in South America where it has been recorded from Guyana, Suriname and Venezuela. It is found in clear water streams with gravel, sand and pebbles on the bed and aquatic vegetation.

Images of a paratype kept at Naturalis Biodiversity Center

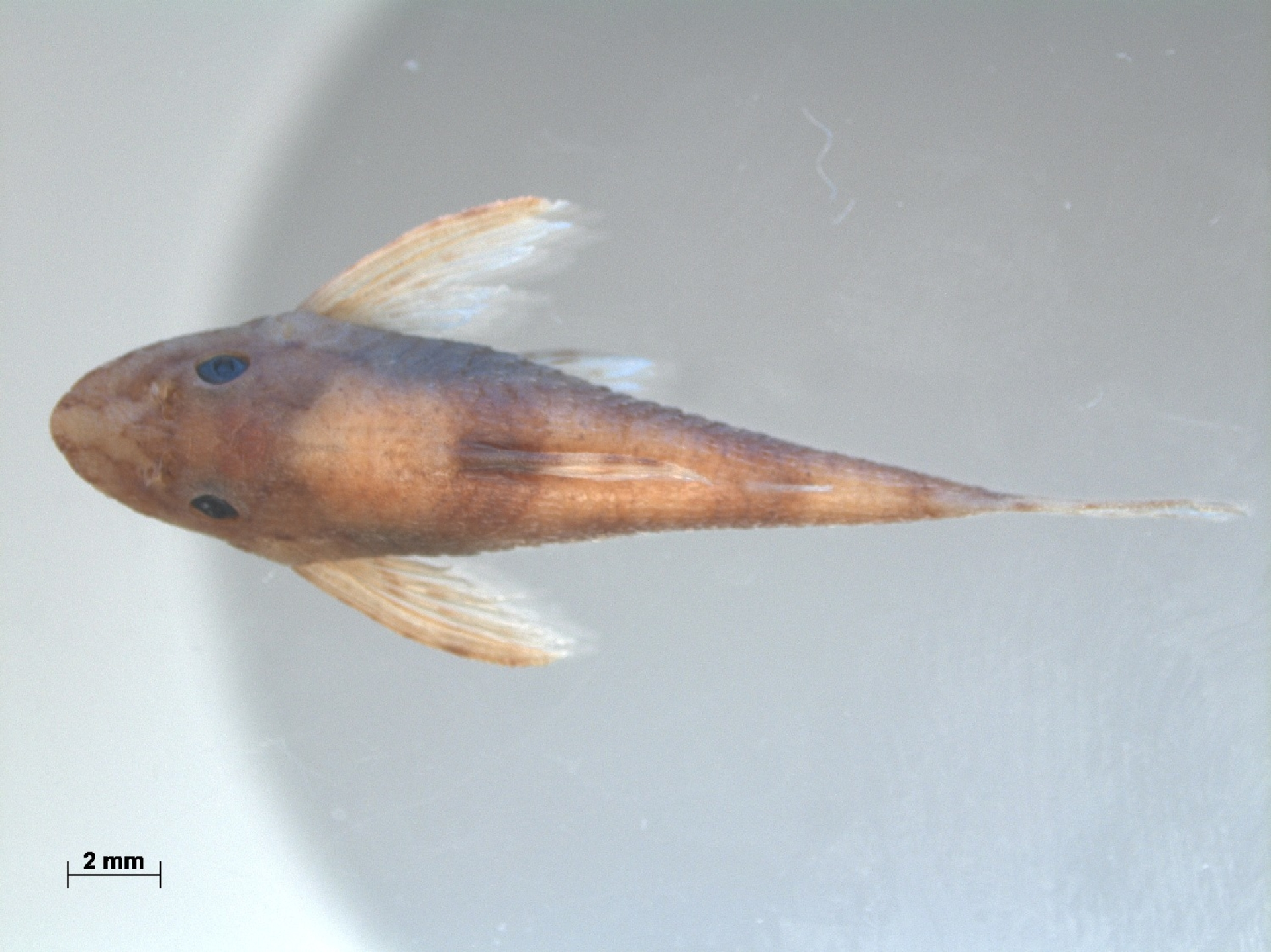

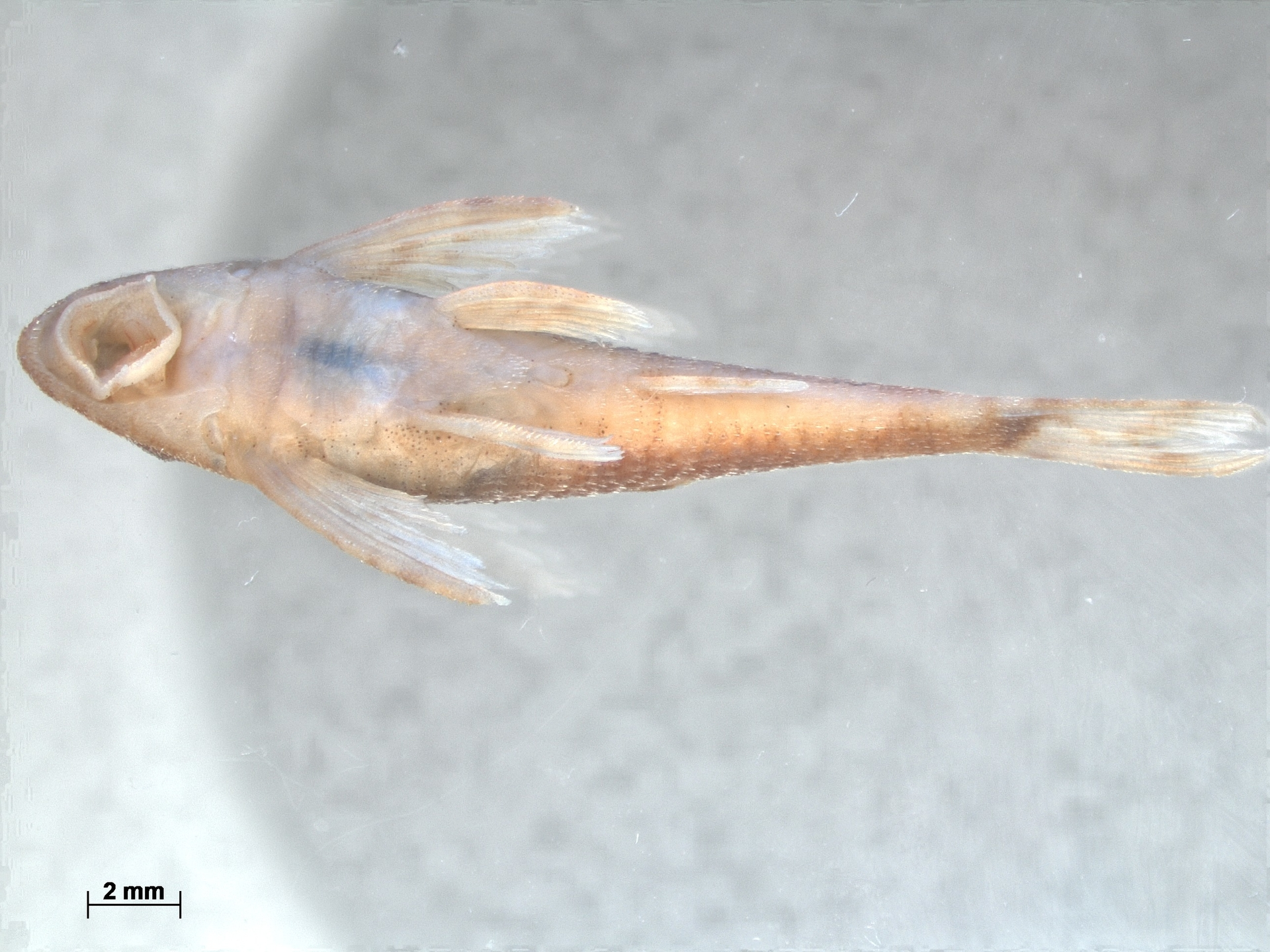

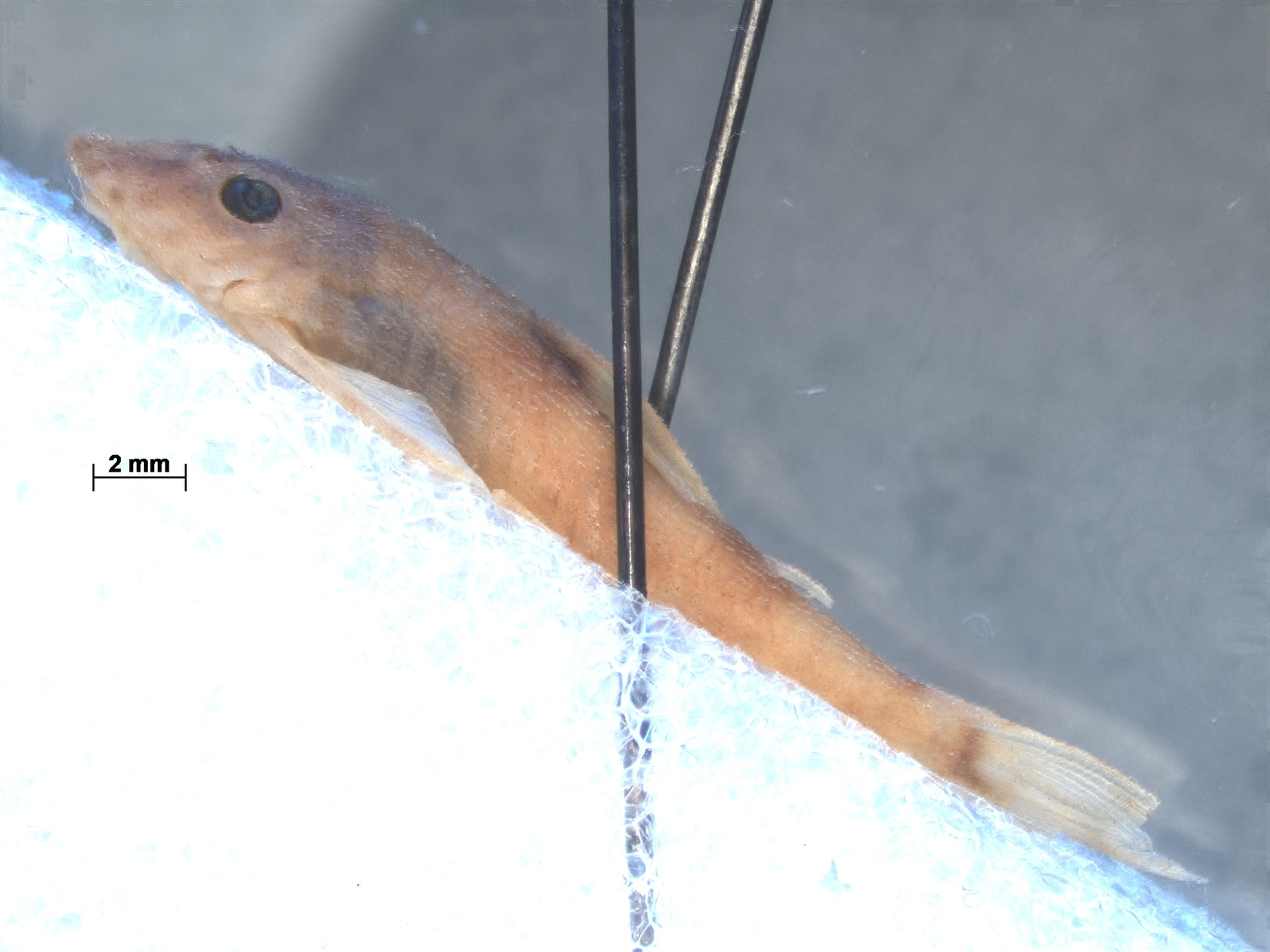

Media related to Parotocinclus britskii at Wikimedia Commons
