= Pariolius =

Scientific classification
- Domain: Eukaryota
- Kingdom: Animalia
- Phylum: Chordata
- Class: Actinopterygii
- Order: Siluriformes
- Family: Heptapteridae
- Genus: Pariolius; Cope, 1872

Genus of fishes

Pariolius is a genus of three-barbeled catfish native to South America. It was monotypic (containing one species, P. armillatus) for more than 150 years until further congeners were discovered in 2024.

== Species ==
There are currently three recognized species in this genus:

- Pariolius armillatus Cope, 1872
- Pariolius maldonadoi Faustino-Fuster, D. R., López-Castaño, J. A., Quiñones, J. M. & Meza-Vargas, V., 2024
- Pariolius pax Faustino-Fuster, D. R., López-Castaño, J. A., Quiñones, J. M. & Meza-Vargas, V., 2024
