= Phenacorhamdia =

Scientific classification
- Kingdom: Animalia
- Phylum: Chordata
- Class: Actinopterygii
- Order: Siluriformes
- Family: Heptapteridae
- Genus: Phenacorhamdia; Dahl, 1961

Type species
- Phenacorhamdia macarenensis Dahl, 1961

Genus of fishes

Phenacorhamdia is a genus of three-barbeled catfishes native to tropical South America.

== Species ==
There are currently 15 recognized species in this genus:

- Phenacorhamdia anisura (Mees, 1987)
- Phenacorhamdia boliviana (N. E. Pearson, 1924)
- Phenacorhamdia cabocla Rocha, Ramos & Ramos, 2018
- Phenacorhamdia cuspidata Silva, Castro, Ohara & Oliveira, 2024
- Phenacorhamdia hoehnei (A. Miranda-Ribeiro, 1914)
- Phenacorhamdia macarenensis Dahl, 1961
- Phenacorhamdia nigrolineata Zarske, 1998
- Phenacorhamdia provenzanoi DoNascimiento & Milani, 2008
- Phenacorhamdia roxoi Silva, 2020
- Phenacorhamdia somnians (Mees, 1974)
- Phenacorhamdia suia Silva, Ochoa & Castro, 2022
- Phenacorhamdia taphorni DoNascimiento & Milani, 2008
- Phenacorhamdia tenebrosa (Schubart, 1964)
- Phenacorhamdia tenuis Mees, 1986
- Phenacorhamdia unifasciata Britski, 1993
