= Acentronichthys =

Conservation status
- Least Concern (IUCN 3.1)

Scientific classification
- Kingdom: Animalia
- Phylum: Chordata
- Class: Actinopterygii
- Order: Siluriformes
- Family: Heptapteridae
- Genus: Acentronichthys; C. H. Eigenmann & R. S. Eigenmann, 1889
- Species: A. leptos

Binomial name
- Acentronichthys leptos C. H. Eigenmann & R. S. Eigenmann, 1889

Genus of fishes

Acentronichthys leptos is the only species of catfish (order Siluriformes) in the genus Acentronichthys of the family Heptapteridae. This species occurs in coastal streams in Brazil from Rio de Janeiro to Santa Catarina State, in São Mateus, Espírito Santo State and on Leopoldina, Minas Gerais. This species grows to 9.1 cm (3.6 in) in SL.
