= Myoglanis =

Scientific classification
- Kingdom: Animalia
- Phylum: Chordata
- Class: Actinopterygii
- Order: Siluriformes
- Family: Heptapteridae
- Genus: Myoglanis; C. H. Eigenmann, 1912

Type species
- Myoglanis potaroensis Eigenmann 1912

Genus of fishes

Myoglanis is a genus of three-barbeled catfishes native to tropical South America.

== Species ==
There are currently two recognized species in this genus:

- Myoglanis koepckei Chang, 1999
- Myoglanis potaroensis C. H. Eigenmann, 1912
