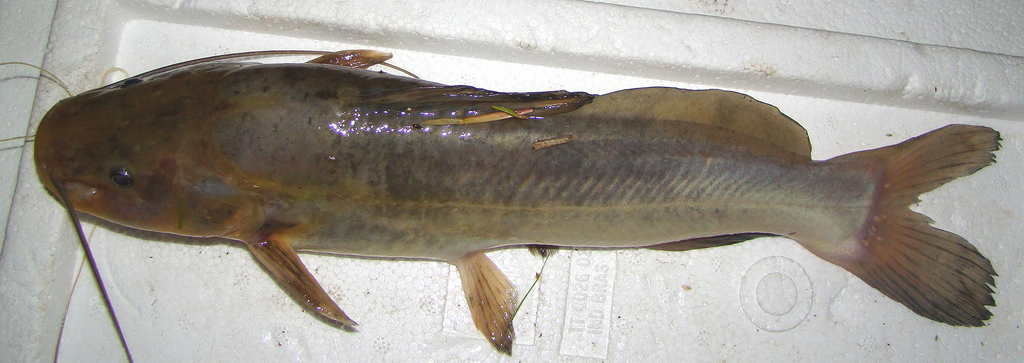
- Rhamdia quelen

Scientific classification
- Kingdom: Animalia
- Phylum: Chordata
- Class: Actinopterygii
- Order: Siluriformes
- Family: Heptapteridae
- Genus: Rhamdia; Bleeker, 1858

Type species
- Pimelodus sebae = Rhamdia quelen G. Cuvier, 1829

Synonyms
- Caecorhamdia Norman, 1926; Pimelenotus Gill, 1858; Pteronotus Swainson, 1839

= Rhamdia =

Genus of fishes

Rhamdia is a genus of three-barbeled catfishes found in Mexico, Central and South America. These catfishes are nocturnal, opportunistic carnivores, found in a wide range of freshwater habitats. This genus includes a number of troglobitic members, encompassing a number of taxa, including R. enfurnada, R. guasarensis, R. laluchensis, R. laticauda, R. macuspanensis, R. quelen, R. reddelli and R. zongolicensis. In a few of these only some of their populations are troglobitic.

== Species ==
There are currently 27 recognized species in this genus:

- Rhamdia branneri Haseman, 1911
- Rhamdia cinerascens (Günther, 1860)
- Rhamdia enfurnada Bichuette & Trajano, 2005
- Rhamdia eurycephala Angrizani & Malabarba, 2018
- Rhamdia foina (J. P. Müller & Troschel, 1849)
- Rhamdia gabrielae Angrizani & Malabarba, 2018
- Rhamdia guasarensis DoNascimiento, Provenzano & Lundberg, 2004
- Rhamdia guatemalensis (Günther, 1864)
- Rhamdia humilis (Günther, 1864)
- Rhamdia itacaiunas Silfvergrip, 1996
- Rhamdia jequitinhonha Silfvergrip, 1996
- Rhamdia laluchensis A. Weber, Allegrucci & Sbordoni, 2003 (La Lucha blind catfish)
- Rhamdia laticauda (Kner, 1858) (File-spine chulín)
- Rhamdia laukidi Bleeker, 1858
- Rhamdia macuspanensis A. Weber & Wilkens, 1998 (Olmec blind catfish)
- Rhamdia muelleri (Günther, 1864)
- Rhamdia nicaraguensis (Günther, 1864)
- Rhamdia parryi C. H. Eigenmann & R. S. Eigenmann, 1888 (Tonala catfish)
- Rhamdia parvus (Boulenger, 1898)
- Rhamdia poeyi C. H. Eigenmann & R. S. Eigenmann, 1888
- Rhamdia quelen (Quoy & Gaimard, 1824) (Silver catfish)
- Rhamdia reddelli R. R. Miller, 1984 (Blind-whiskered catfish)
- Rhamdia saijaensis Rendahl (de), 1941
- Rhamdia schomburgkii Bleeker, 1858
- Rhamdia velifer (Humboldt, 1821) Incertae sedis
- Rhamdia voulezi Haseman, 1911
- Rhamdia xetequepeque Silfvergrip, 1996
- Rhamdia zongolicensis Wilkens, 1993 (Zongolica catfish)
