= Gladioglanis =

Scientific classification
- Kingdom: Animalia
- Phylum: Chordata
- Class: Actinopterygii
- Order: Siluriformes
- Family: Heptapteridae
- Genus: Gladioglanis; Ferraris & Mago-Leccia, 1989

Type species
- Gladioglanis machadoi Ferraris & Mago-Leccia, 1989

Genus of fishes

Gladioglanis is a genus of three-barbeled catfishes native to South America.

== Species ==
There are currently three recognized species in this genus:

- Gladioglanis anacanthus M. S. Rocha, R. R. de Oliveira & Rapp Py-Daniel, 2008
- Gladioglanis conquistador Lundberg, Bornbusch & Mago-Leccia, 1991
- Gladioglanis machadoi Ferraris & Mago-Leccia, 1989
