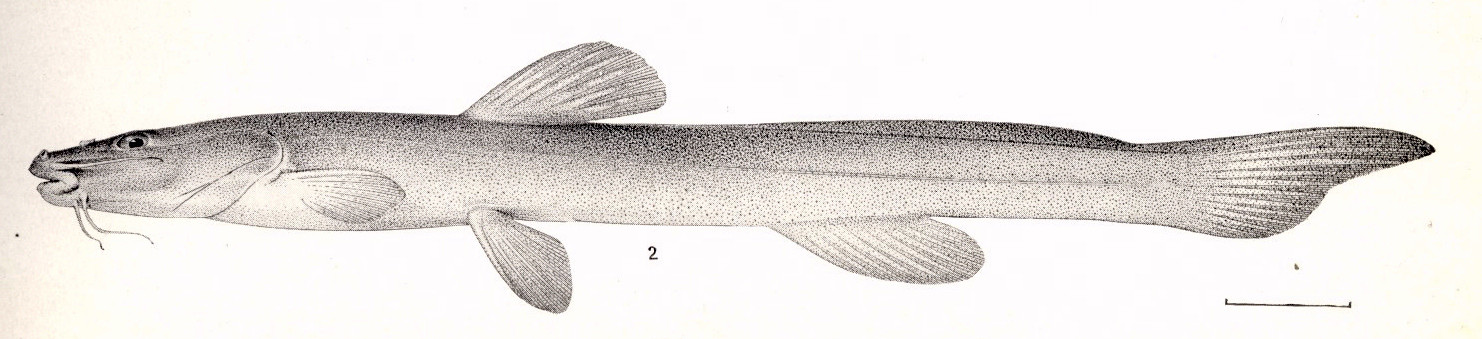
- Imparfinis hollandi

Scientific classification
- Kingdom: Animalia
- Phylum: Chordata
- Class: Actinopterygii
- Division: Teleostei
- Order: Siluriformes
- Family: Heptapteridae
- Genus: Imparfinis; C. H. Eigenmann & A. A. Norris, 1900

Type species
- Imparfinis piperatus Eigenmann & Norris, 1900

= Imparfinis =

Genus of fishes

Imparfinis is a genus of three-barbeled catfishes native to South America, with a single species (I. lineatus) in Central America.

== Species ==
There are currently 23 recognized species in this genus:

- Imparfinis arceae Silva, Sabaj Pérez, Carvalho & Oliveira, 2025
- Imparfinis cochabambae (Fowler, 1940)
- Imparfinis guttatus (N. E. Pearson, 1924)
- Imparfinis hasemani Steindachner, 1915
- Imparfinis lepturus Silva, Reia, Morimoto, Benine & Oliveira, 2023
- Imparfinis lineatus (W. A. Bussing, 1970)
- Imparfinis longicauda (Boulenger, 1887)
- Imparfinis microps C. H. Eigenmann & Fisher, 1916
- Imparfinis minutus (Lütken, 1874)
- Imparfinis mirini Haseman, 1911
- Imparfinis mishky Almirón, Casciotta, Bechara, Ruiz Díaz, Bruno, D'Ambrosio, Solimano & Soneiro, 2007
- Imparfinis munduruku Castro & Wosiacki, 2019
- Imparfinis nemacheir (C. H. Eigenmann & Fisher, 1916)
- Imparfinis pijpersi (Hoedeman, 1961)
- Imparfinis piperatus C. H. Eigenmann & A. A. Norris, 1900
- Imparfinis pristos Mees & Cala, 1989
- Imparfinis pseudonemacheir Mees & Cala, 1989
- Imparfinis robustus Cortés-Hernández, López-Castaño, Milani & DoNascimiento, 2023
- Imparfinis schubarti (A. L. Gomes, 1956)
- Imparfinis spurrellii (Regan, 1913)
- Imparfinis stictonotus (Fowler, 1940)
- Imparfinis timana Ortega-Lara, Milani, DoNascimiento, Villa-Navarro & Maldenado-Ocampo, 2011
- Imparfinis usmai Ortega-Lara, Milani, DoNascimiento, Villa-Navarro & Maldenado-Ocampo, 2011
