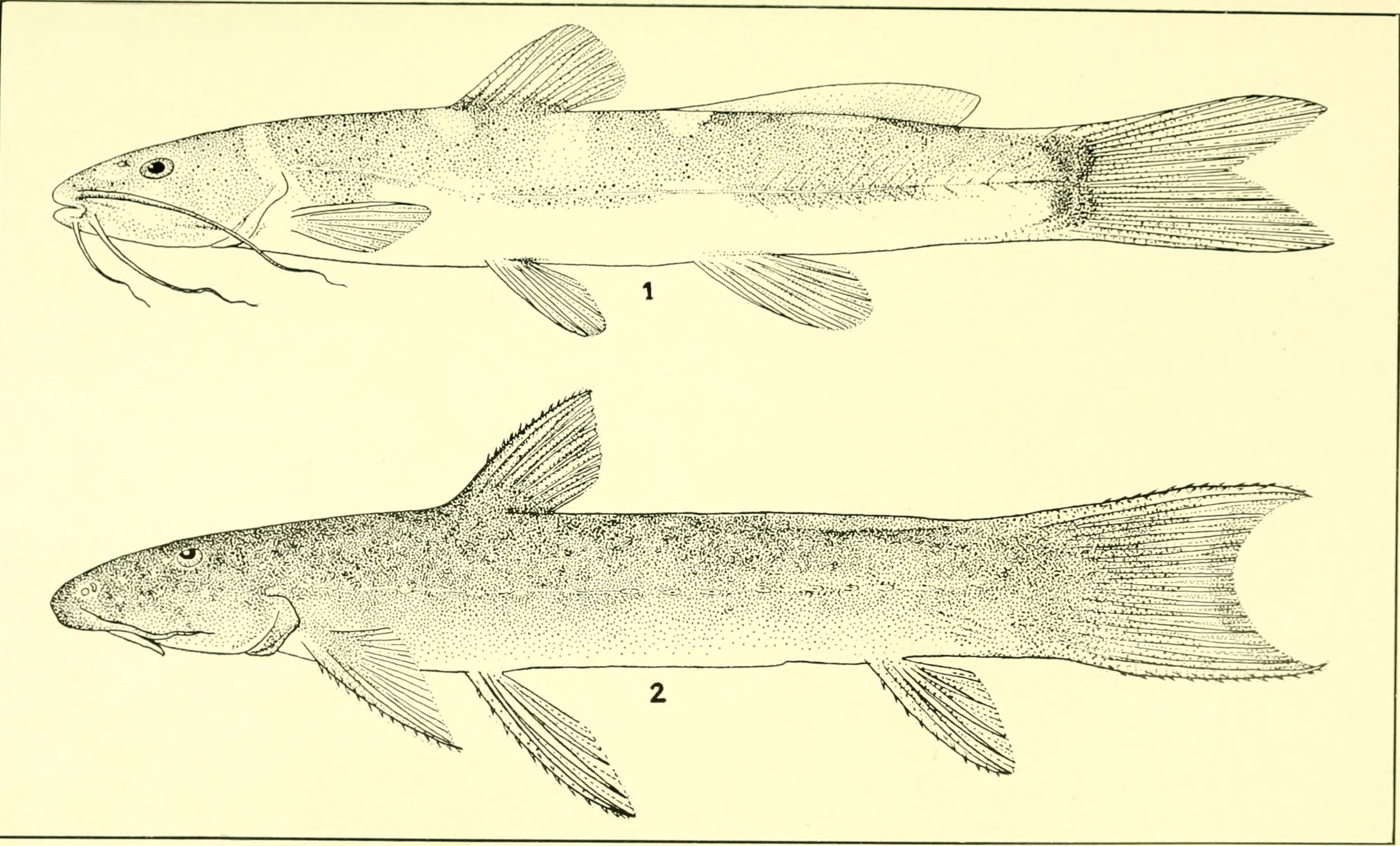
- Rhamdella montana top

Scientific classification
- Kingdom: Animalia
- Phylum: Chordata
- Class: Actinopterygii
- Division: Teleostei
- Order: Siluriformes
- Family: Heptapteridae
- Genus: Rhamdella; C. H. Eigenmann & R. S. Eigenmann, 1888

Type species
- Rhamdia eriarcha C. H. Eigenmann & R. S. Eigenmann 1888

= Rhamdella =

Genus of fishes

Rhamdella is a genus of three-barbeled catfishes native to South America.

== Species ==
There are currently 10 recognized species in this genus:

- Rhamdella aymarae Miquelarena & Menni, 1999
- Rhamdella cainguae Bockmann & Miquelarena, 2008
- Rhamdella eriarcha C. H. Eigenmann & R. S. Eigenmann, 1888
- Rhamdella exsudans Jenyns, 1842
- Rhamdella gilli (Starks, 1906)
- Rhamdella jenynsii Günther, 1864
- Rhamdella longiuscula C. A. S. de Lucena & J. F. P. da Silva, 1991
- Rhamdella montana C. H. Eigenmann, 1913
- Rhamdella rusbyi N. E. Pearson, 1924
- Rhamdella zelimai R. E. dos Reis, L. R. Malabarba & C. A. S. de Lucena, 2014
