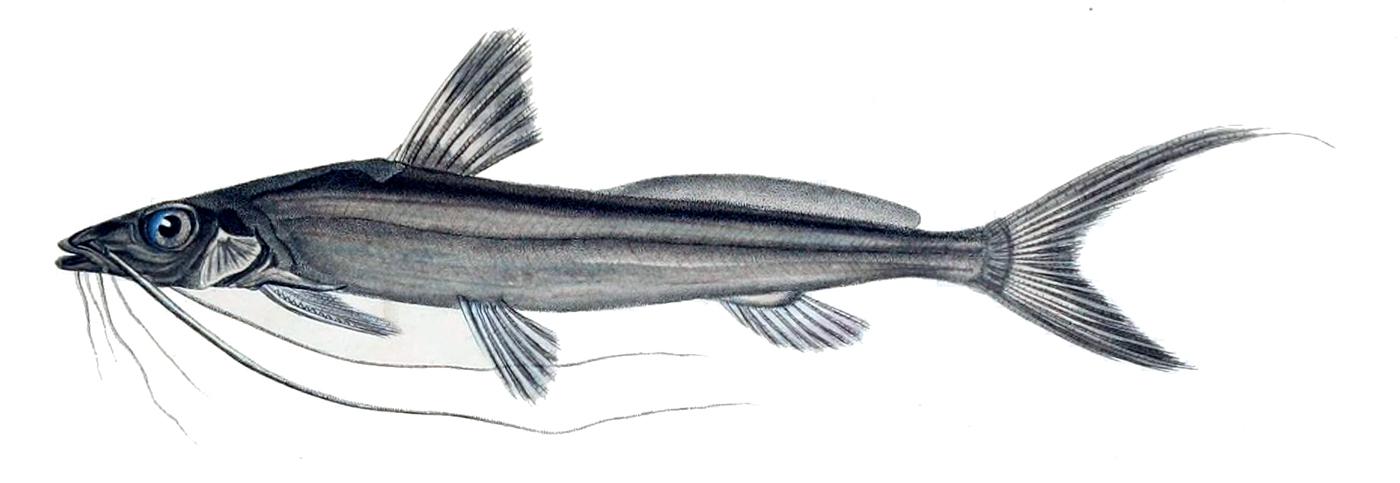
- Pimelodella gracilis

Scientific classification
- Kingdom: Animalia
- Phylum: Chordata
- Class: Actinopterygii
- Order: Siluriformes
- Family: Heptapteridae
- Genus: Pimelodella; C. H. Eigenmann & R. S. Eigenmann, 1888

Type species
- Pimelodus cristatus J. P. Müller & Troschel, 1848.

Species
- See text.

Synonyms
- Typhlobagrus A. Miranda Ribeiro, 1907; Caecorhamdella Borodin, 1927

= Pimelodella =

Genus of fishes

Pimelodella is a genus of three-barbeled catfishes.

Pimelodella is the largest genus in the family. However, it is in need of taxonomic revision.

This genus is found on both sides of the Andes, ranging from Panama to Paraguay and southern Brazil. With the exception of P. chagresi, all members of the genus are restricted to South America. This genus includes two species of troglobitic catfishes, P. kronei and P. spelaea.

== Species ==
There are currently 81 recognized species in this genus:

- Pimelodella altipinnis (Steindachner, 1864)
- Pimelodella australis C. H. Eigenmann, 1917
- Pimelodella avanhandavae C. H. Eigenmann, 1917
- Pimelodella bockmanni Slobodian & Pastana, 2018
- Pimelodella boliviana C. H. Eigenmann, 1917
- Pimelodella boschmai van der Stigchel, 1964
- Pimelodella brasiliensis (Steindachner, 1877)
- Pimelodella breviceps (Kner, 1858)
- Pimelodella buckleyi (Boulenger, 1887)
- Pimelodella chagresi (Steindachner, 1876)
- Pimelodella chaparae Fowler, 1940
- Pimelodella conquetaensis C. G. E. Ahl, 1925
- Pimelodella cristata (J. P. Müller & Troschel, 1848)
- Pimelodella cruxenti Fernández-Yépez, 1950
- Pimelodella cyanostigma (Cope, 1870)
- Pimelodella dorseyi Fowler, 1941
- Pimelodella eigenmanni (Boulenger, 1891)
- Pimelodella eigenmanniorum (A. Miranda-Ribeiro, 1911)
- Pimelodella elongata (Günther, 1860)
- Pimelodella enochi Fowler, 1941
- Pimelodella eutaenia Regan, 1913
- Pimelodella figueroai Dahl, 1961
- Pimelodella geryi Hoedeman, 1961
- Pimelodella gracilis (Valenciennes, 1835) (Graceful pimelodella)
- Pimelodella griffini C. H. Eigenmann, 1917
- Pimelodella grisea (Regan, 1903)
- Pimelodella hartii (Steindachner, 1877)
- Pimelodella hartwelli Fowler, 1940
- Pimelodella hasemani C. H. Eigenmann, 1917
- Pimelodella howesi Fowler, 1940
- Pimelodella humeralis Slobodian, Akama & Dutra, 2017
- Pimelodella ignobilis (Steindachner, 1907)
- Pimelodella itapicuruensis C. H. Eigenmann, 1917
- Pimelodella kronei (A. Miranda-Ribeiro, 1907)
- Pimelodella lateristriga (M. H. C. Lichtenstein, 1823)
- Pimelodella laticeps C. H. Eigenmann, 1917
- Pimelodella laurenti Fowler, 1941
- Pimelodella leptosoma (Fowler, 1914)
- Pimelodella linami L. P. Schultz, 1944
- Pimelodella longibarbata Cortés-Hernández, DoNascimiento & Ramírez-Gil, 2020
- Pimelodella longipinnis (Borodin, 1927)
- Pimelodella macrocephala (Miles, 1943)
- Pimelodella macturki C. H. Eigenmann, 1912
- Pimelodella martinezi Fernández-Yépez, 1970
- Pimelodella meeki C. H. Eigenmann, 1910
- Pimelodella megalops C. H. Eigenmann, 1912
- Pimelodella megalura A. Miranda-Ribeiro, 1918
- Pimelodella metae C. H. Eigenmann, 1917
- Pimelodella modestus (Günther, 1860)
- Pimelodella montana W. R. Allen, 1942
- Pimelodella mucosa C. H. Eigenmann & Ward, 1907
- Pimelodella nigrofasciata (Perugia, 1897)
- Pimelodella notomelas C. H. Eigenmann, 1917
- Pimelodella odynea L. P. Schultz, 1944
- Pimelodella ophthalmica (Cope, 1878)
- Pimelodella pallida Dahl, 1961
- Pimelodella papariae (Fowler, 1941)
- Pimelodella pappenheimi C. G. E. Ahl, 1925
- Pimelodella parnahybae Fowler, 1941
- Pimelodella parva Güntert, 1942
- Pimelodella pectinifer C. H. Eigenmann & R. S. Eigenmann, 1888
- Pimelodella peruana C. H. Eigenmann & G. S. Myers, 1942
- Pimelodella peruensis Fowler, 1915
- Pimelodella procera Mees, 1983
- Pimelodella rendahli C. G. E. Ahl, 1925
- Pimelodella reyesi Dahl, 1964
- Pimelodella robinsoni (Fowler, 1941)
- Pimelodella roccae C. H. Eigenmann, 1917
- Pimelodella rudolphi A. Miranda-Ribeiro, 1918
- Pimelodella serrata C. H. Eigenmann, 1917
- Pimelodella spelaea Trajano, R. E. dos Reis & Bichuette, 2004
- Pimelodella steindachneri C. H. Eigenmann, 1917
- Pimelodella taeniophora (Regan, 1903)
- Pimelodella taenioptera A. Miranda-Ribeiro, 1914
- Pimelodella tapatapae C. H. Eigenmann, 1920
- Pimelodella transitoria A. Miranda-Ribeiro, 1907
- Pimelodella vittata (Lütken, 1874)
- Pimelodella wesselii (Steindachner, 1877)
- Pimelodella witmeri Fowler, 1941
- Pimelodella wolfi (Fowler, 1941)
- Pimelodella yaharo Conde-Saldaña, Albornoz-Garzón, García-Melo, Dergam& Villa-Navarro, 2019
- Pimelodella yuncensis Steindachner, 1902
