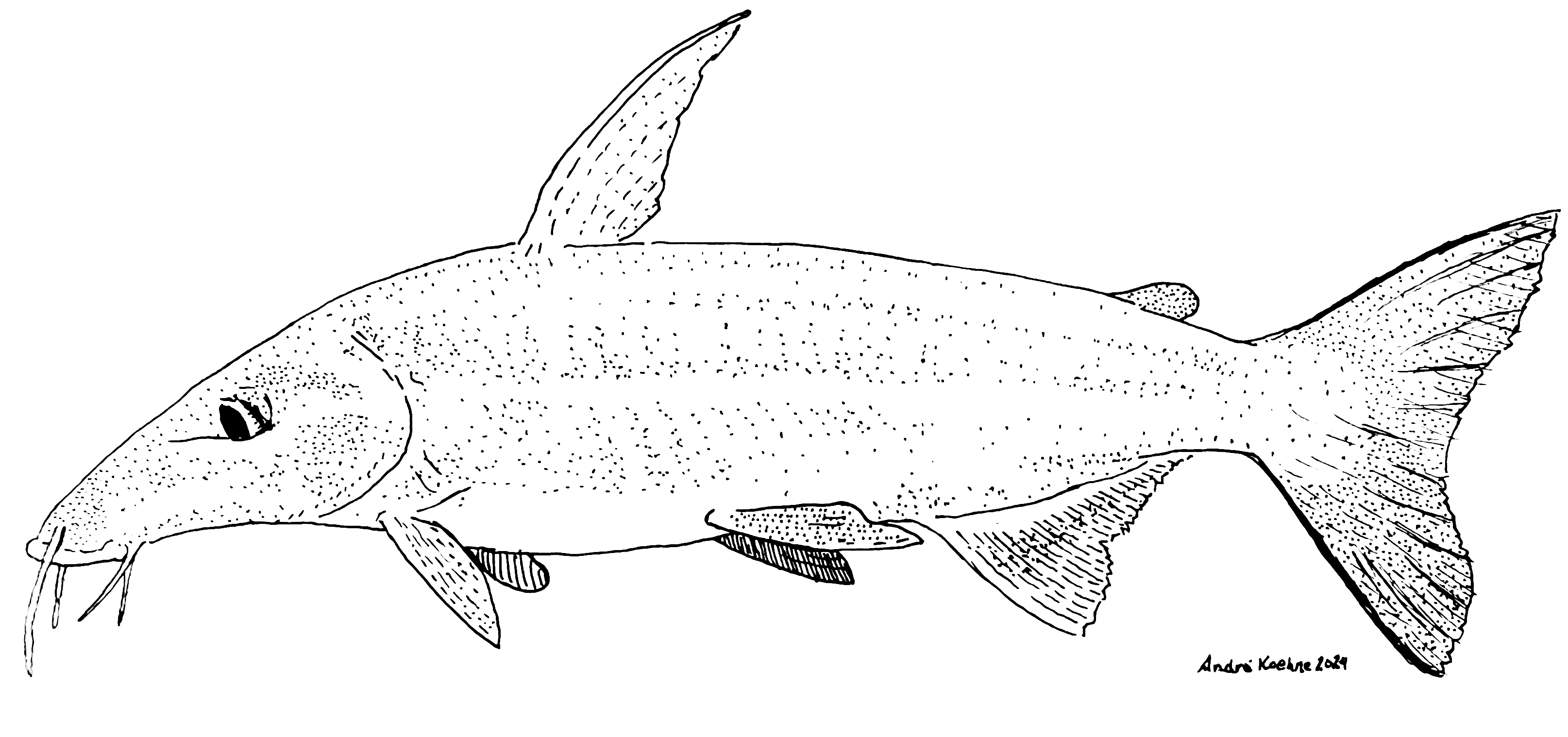

Conservation status
- Endangered (IUCN 3.1)

Scientific classification
- Kingdom: Animalia
- Phylum: Chordata
- Class: Actinopterygii
- Order: Siluriformes
- Superfamily: Pimelodoidea
- Family: incertae sedis
- Genus: Conorhynchos; Bleeker, 1858
- Species: C. conirostris

Binomial name
- Conorhynchos conirostris (Cuvier, 1829); Bleeker, 1858

Synonyms
- Pimelodus conirostris Cuvier, 1829, (See also Valenciennes, 1840 (lapsus as "nob")); Conorhynchus [sic] conirostris (Cuvier, 1829); per Bleeker, 1863; Conorhynchus [sic] glaber Steindachner, 1877

= Conorhynchos =

Monotypic genus of fish

Conorhynchos conirostris is a monotypic genus of catfish (order Siluriformes).

The spelling of the generic name has been confused; it is currently valid as Conorhynchos as described by Pieter Bleeker in 1858. This catfish has uncertain relationships and is placed incertae sedis in Siluriformes. However, it has been previously been placed in Pimelodidae or Heptapteridae, and grouped into the superfamily Pimelodoidea due to molecular evidence.

Conorhynchos conirostris is endemic to the São Francisco River in Brazil and is considered a symbol of the river. This fish can reach 53.5 centimetres (21.1 in) in standard length and 13 kilograms (29 lb) in weight. This fish is of commercial interest, and is considered threatened by Brazil's Ministry of the Environment.
