= Rhinotocinclus =

Scientific classification
- Kingdom: Animalia
- Phylum: Chordata
- Class: Actinopterygii
- Order: Siluriformes
- Family: Loricariidae
- Subfamily: Hypoptopomatinae
- Genus: Rhinotocinclus; Reis & Lehmann A., 2022

Type species
- Parotocinclus longirostris (Garavello, 1988)

Genus of fishes

Rhinotocinclus is a genus of freshwater ray-finned fishes belonging to the family Loricariidae, the suckermouth armoured catfishes, and the subfamily Hypoptopomatinae, the cascudinhos. The catfishes in this genus are found in South America. It was erected in July 2022, taking species from the genera Parotocinclus, Curculionichthys, and Hisonotus.

== Taxonomy ==
Rhinotocinclus was first proposed as a genus in 2022 by the Brazilian ichthyologists Roberto Esser dos Reis and Pablo César Lehmann Albornoz when they described five new species and transferred 18 species from the genera Parotocinclus, Curculionichthys and Hisonotus. Parotocinclus longirostris, which was described in 19888 by Julio C. Garavello with its type locality given as the Preto da Eva River on the Manaus to Itacoatiara highway at kilometre 80, in the municipality of Manaus in the Brazilian state of Amazonas. Eschmeyer's Catalog of Fishes classified the genus Pseudotocinclus in the subfamily Hypoptopomatinae, the cascudinhos, within the suckermouth armored catfish family Loricariidae.

== Etymology ==
Rhinotocinclus combines rhinos, which is the genitive of rhis, meaning "beak" or "snout", an allusion to the "conspicuous and elegant" snout of the type species, with the name of the related genus Otocinclus.

== Species ==
Rhinotocinclus contains the following valid species:

- Rhinotocinclus acuen (Silva, Roxo & Oliveira, 2014)
- Rhinotocinclus bockmanni Carvalho & Datovo, 2012
- Rhinotocinclus britskii (Boeseman, 1974)
- Rhinotocinclus chromodontus (Britski & Garavello, 2007)
- Rhinotocinclus collinsae (Schmidt & Ferraris, 1985)
- Rhinotocinclus dani (Roxo, Silva & Oliveira, 2016)
- Rhinotocinclus dinizae (Ribeiro-Silva, Silva, Venere, Pains da Silva & Roxo, 2020)
- Rhinotocinclus discolor Reis & Lehmann A., 2022
- Rhinotocinclus eppleyi (Schaefer & Provenzano, 1993)
- Rhinotocinclus halbothi (Lehmann A., Lazzarotto & Reis, 2014)
- Rhinotocinclus hardmani (Lehmann A., Lujan & Reis, 2022)
- Rhinotocinclus hera (Gamarra, Calegari & Reis, 2019)
- Rhinotocinclus isabelae Reis & Lehmann A., 2022
- Rhinotocinclus jumaorum (Dias, Silva, Oliveira & Roxo, 2018)
- Rhinotocinclus kwarup (Lehmann A. & Reis, 2021)
- Rhinotocinclus longirostris (Garavello, 1988)
- Rhinotocinclus loxochelis Reis & Lehmann A., 2022
- Rhinotocinclus marginalis Reis & Lehmann A., 2022
- Rhinotocinclus pentakelis (Roxo, Messias & Silva, 2019)
- Rhinotocinclus pilosus Reis & Lehmann A., 2022
- Rhinotocinclus polyochrus (Schaefer, 1988)
- Rhinotocinclus variola (Lehmann A., Schvambach & Reis, 2015)
- Rhinotocinclus yaka (Lehmann A., Lima & Reis, 2018)

== Characteristics ==
Rhinotocinclus is told apart from all other genera in the subfamily Hypoptopomatinae by having the plate over the canal in the cheek on the lower surface of the head elongated to the rear and touching the cleithrum. There are other characteristics which can be used to distinguish this genus from other individual genera within the same subfamily.

== Distribution ==
Rhinotocinclus catfishes are found in South America, mainly in Brazil, but they have also been found in Colombia, Guyana, Peru, Suriname and Venezuela.
