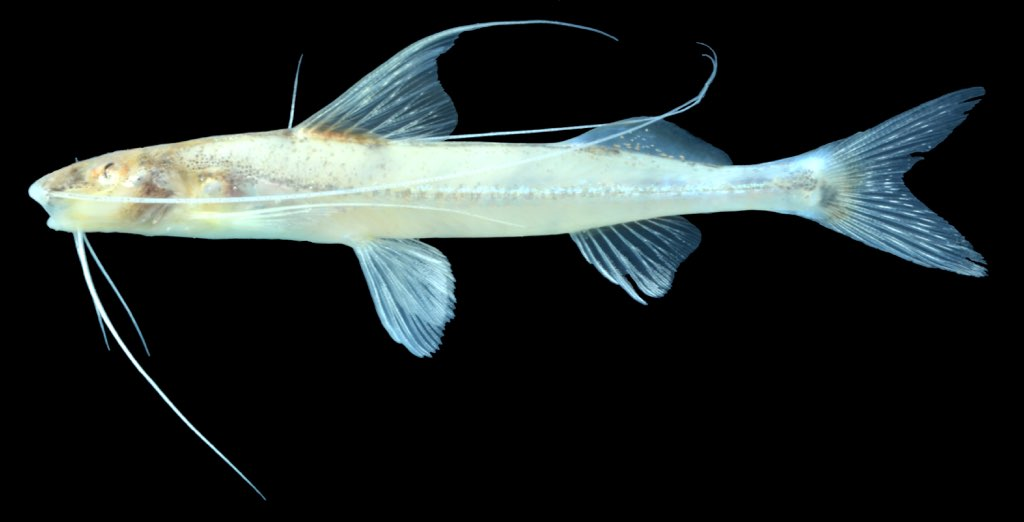

Conservation status
- Least Concern (IUCN 3.1)

Scientific classification
- Kingdom: Animalia
- Phylum: Chordata
- Class: Actinopterygii
- Division: Teleostei
- Order: Siluriformes
- Family: Heptapteridae
- Genus: Mastiglanis
- Species: M. asopos

Binomial name
- Mastiglanis asopos Bockmann, 1994

= Mastiglanis asopos =

Species of fish

Mastiglanis asopos is a species of three-barbeled catfish.

== Description ==
This species has a broad distribution, mainly throughout the left side tributaries of the Amazon basin and the Capim River basin in Brazil, as well as in the right tributaries of the Amazon basin in Brazil, Orinoco basin of Venezuela, and drainages in Guyana.

M. asopos is a strictly sand-dwelling species. It spends the daytime buried in the top layer of sand. It forages mostly at night and sometimes in the morning. As an ambush predator, when foraging, it poises in the streamlet channel where water is flowing, supported by a tripod formed by its pelvic and anal fins, spreading both its very long barbels and the filamentous dorsal and pectoral-fin rays, thus forming a kind of "drift-trap". When the fish intercepts food, it will lunge at these food particles; after lunging for a short distance, it will return to its previous hunting spot. This behavior is similar to that seen in the tripod fish. Small trichopteran larvae (ingested with the sand cases) and ephemeropterans constituted a considerable portion of the gut contents in a study of Mastiglanis asopos, but their foraging behavior allows a varied diet which includes large chironomid larvae and small adult beetles that would not be consumed by other sand-dwelling animals.

M. asopos grows to 6.6 centimetres (2.6 in) SL. This fish has long barbels and long first pectoral fin rays which are used for feeding. It also has an acuminate (tapered to a point) snout.
