= Rhamdioglanis =

Scientific classification
- Domain: Eukaryota
- Kingdom: Animalia
- Phylum: Chordata
- Class: Actinopterygii
- Order: Siluriformes
- Family: Heptapteridae
- Genus: Rhamdioglanis; R. von Ihering, 1907

Type species
- Rhamdioglanis frenatus Ihering 1907

Genus of fishes

Rhamdioglanis is a genus of three-barbeled catfishes native to South America where they are endemic to Brazil.

== Species ==
There are currently 2 recognized species in this genus:

- Rhamdioglanis frenatus R. von Ihering, 1907
- Rhamdioglanis transfasciatus A. Miranda-Ribeiro, 1908
