= Nemuroglanis =

Scientific classification
- Kingdom: Animalia
- Phylum: Chordata
- Class: Actinopterygii
- Order: Siluriformes
- Family: Heptapteridae
- Genus: Nemuroglanis; C. H. Eigenmann & R. S. Eigenmann, 1889

Type species
- Nemuroglanis lanceolatus C. H. Eigenmann & R. S. Eigenmann 1889

Genus of fishes

Nemuroglanis is a genus of three-barbeled catfishes. With the exception of N. panamensis from Panama, they are native to tropical South America.

== Species ==
There are currently four recognized species in this genus:

- Nemuroglanis furcatus F. R. V. Ribeiro, Pedroza & Rapp Py-Daniel, 2011
- Nemuroglanis lanceolatus C. H. Eigenmann & R. S. Eigenmann, 1889
- Nemuroglanis mariai (L. P. Schultz, 1944)
- Nemuroglanis pauciradiatus Ferraris, 1988
