= Leptorhamdia =

Scientific classification
- Kingdom: Animalia
- Phylum: Chordata
- Class: Actinopterygii
- Order: Siluriformes
- Family: Heptapteridae
- Genus: Leptorhamdia; C. H. Eigenmann, 1918

Type species
- Leptoglanis essequibensis Eigenmann 1912

Genus of fishes

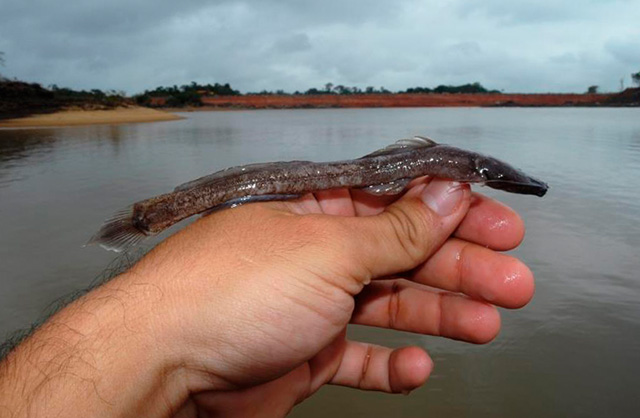
Leptorhamdia schultzi, Brazil, Xingu River, Para

Leptorhamdia is a genus of three-barbeled catfishes native to tropical South America.

== Species ==
There are currently five recognized species in this genus:

- Leptorhamdia aspredinoides (DoNascimiento & Lundberg, 2005)
- Leptorhamdia essequibensis (C. H. Eigenmann, 1912)
- Leptorhamdia marmorata G. S. Myers, 1928
- Leptorhamdia nocturna (G. S. Myers, 1928)
- Leptorhamdia schultzi (P. Miranda-Ribeiro, 1964)
