= Rhinotocinclus halbothi =

Conservation status
- Least Concern (IUCN 3.1)

Scientific classification
- Kingdom: Animalia
- Phylum: Chordata
- Class: Actinopterygii
- Order: Siluriformes
- Family: Loricariidae
- Genus: Rhinotocinclus
- Species: R. halbothi

Binomial name
- Rhinotocinclus halbothi (Lehmann A., Lazzarotto & Reis, 2014)

Synonyms
- Parotocinclus halbothi Lehmann A., Lazzorotto & Reis, 2014

Species of catfish

Rhinotocinclus halbothi is a species of freshwater ray-finned fish belonging to the family Loricariidae, the suckermouth armoured catfishes, and the subfamily Hypoptopomatinae, the cascudinhos. This catfish is found in Brazil and Suriname.

== Taxonomy ==
Rhinotocinclus halbothi was first formally described as Parotocinclus halbothi in 2014 by the Brazilian ichthyologists Pablo César Lehmann Albornoz, Henrique Lazzarotto and Roberto Esser dos Reis with its type locality given as a creek tributary to igarapé do Moura at Platô Monte Branco, Trombetas River drainage, Amazon basin, at 1°35’58.09"S, 56°31’21.83"W, in Oriximiná in the Brazilian state of Pará. In 2022 it was transferred to the newly proposed genus Rhinotocinclusby Roberto Esser dos Reis and Pablo César Lehmann Albornoz. Eschmeyer's Catalog of Fishes classified the genus Rhinotocinclus in the subfamily Hypoptopomatinae, the cascudinhos, within the suckermouth armored catfish family Loricariidae.

== Etymology ==
Rhinotocinclus halbothi is classified in the genus Rhinotocinclus, this name combines rhinos, which is the genitive of rhis, meaning "beak" or "snout", an allusion to the "conspicuous and elegant" snout of the type species, with the name of the related genus Otocinclus. The specific name, honours the Brazilian biologist Dário Armin Halboth who studied the effect of tailings from bauxite mining on fishes in an Amazonian lake and who studied the steam fishes of the Brazilian state of Amapá.

== Distribution, habitat and ecology ==
Rhinotocinclus halbothi is found in South America, where it occurs in the Trombetas River basin in Brazil, as well as the Maroni basin in Suriname. The type locality of the species is a shallow, clear, unvegetated stream with a mixed substrate composed of gravel, sand, and leaf litter, though the fish is reported to be most frequently seen in portions of the stream with a gravel substrate. This species is noted to coexist with a variety of other fishes in its environment, including the genera Aequidens, Apistogramma, Bryconops, Callichthys, Copella, Erythrinus, Gymnorhamphichthys, Helogenes, Hoplias, Laimosemion, Mastiglanis, Pyrrhulina, and Synbranchus. It reaches 2 cm (0.79 in) SL.
