= Juil ciego =

Conservation status
- Critically Endangered (IUCN 3.1)

Scientific classification
- Kingdom: Animalia
- Phylum: Chordata
- Class: Actinopterygii
- Order: Siluriformes
- Family: Heptapteridae
- Genus: Rhamdia
- Species: R. reddelli

Binomial name
- Rhamdia reddelli R. R. Miller, 1984

Species of fish

The juil ciego or blindwhiskered catfish (Rhamdia reddelli) is a species of three-barbeled catfish endemic to Mexico. This species is troglobitic, inhabiting a certain stream that flows through a single cave system.

== Description ==
Like other fish found exclusively in caves, the skin of R. reddelli lacks pigment. The fish also lacks eyes, instead having various sensory organs for taste, smell, and touch; these can help it to orient itself in the total darkness and locate food. It is a small fish up to 11 cm (4.3 in) long, with a flattened head, a long dorsal fin, and a deeply forked tail. The three barbels on the chin are long and packed with sensory cells.

== Distribution ==
R. reddelli is known from a single cave system in Mexico through which flows an underground stream about 3 mi (4.8 km) long. The cave is near San Antonio Cañada, in the Sierra Madre de Oaxaca southeast of Mexico City.

== Ecology ==
No living plants are present in this cave, so this fish is mostly reliant on the detritus of organic material washed into the cave from the surface. Another source of nutrition is bat guano, and the remains of dead bats that happen to fall into the water. With this limited and erratic food supply, the fish has a low metabolic rate and stores fat in its tissues. Breeding only takes place in times of food sufficiency, with a small number of eggs being produced at one time, and in some years, the fish may not breed at all. It exhibits parental care by keeping its newly hatched young in its mouth to prevent predation.

== Status ==
Living in a single cave system, this fish is vulnerable to such events as pollution of the spring and stream that flow through the cave; this puts it in a precarious position as the whole population could be wiped out by a single adverse event. The International Union for Conservation of Nature has rated its conservation status as being "critically endangered".
