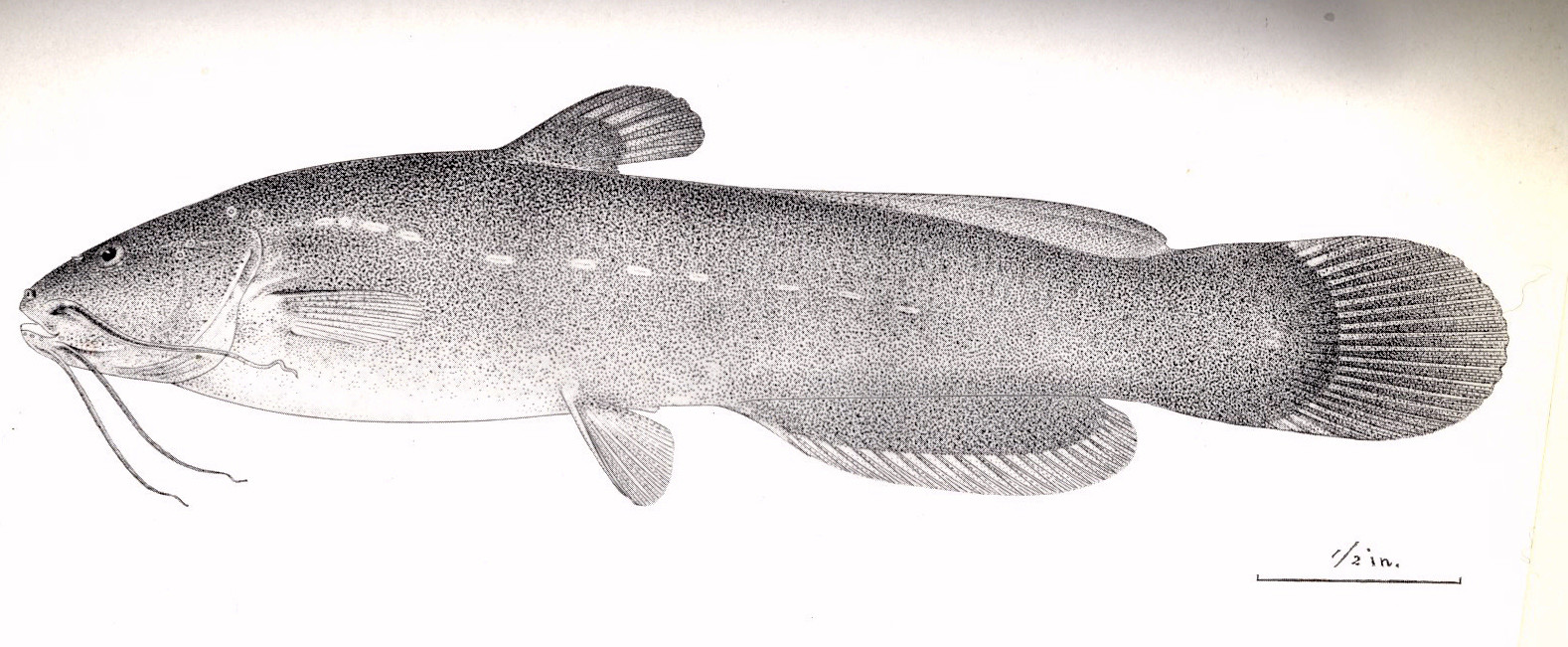
- Rhamdiopsis moreirai

Scientific classification
- Domain: Eukaryota
- Kingdom: Animalia
- Phylum: Chordata
- Class: Actinopterygii
- Order: Siluriformes
- Family: Heptapteridae
- Genus: Rhamdiopsis; Haseman, 1911

Type species
- Rhamdiopsis moreirai Haseman 1911

= Rhamdiopsis =

Genus of fishes

Rhamdiopsis is a genus of three-barbeled catfishes native to South America where they are endemic to Brazil. One species, R. krugi, is troglobitic.

== Species ==
There are currently three recognized species in this genus:

- Rhamdiopsis krugi Bockmann & R. M. C. Castro, 2010
- Rhamdiopsis microcephala (Lütken, 1874)
- Rhamdiopsis moreirai Haseman, 1911
