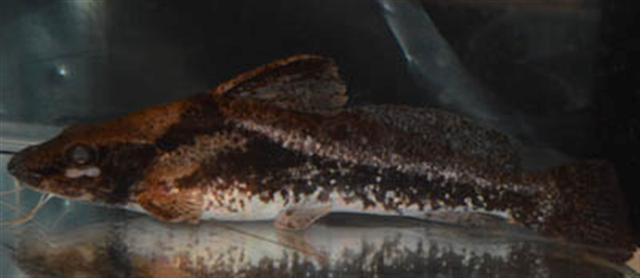

Conservation status
- Least Concern (IUCN 3.1)

Scientific classification
- Kingdom: Animalia
- Phylum: Chordata
- Class: Actinopterygii
- Order: Siluriformes
- Family: Heptapteridae
- Genus: Goeldiella; C. H. Eigenmann & A. A. Norris, 1900
- Species: G. eques

Binomial name
- Goeldiella eques (J. P. Müller & Troschel, 1849)

Synonyms
- Pimelodus eques Müller & Troschel, 1849

= Goeldiella =

Genus of fishes

Goeldiella eques is a species of three-barbeled catfish that occurs in the Guianas and the Amazon basin of Brazil, Peru and Venezuela. This fish reaches a length of 28.9 centimetres (11.4 in) SL. It is the only species of its genus.
