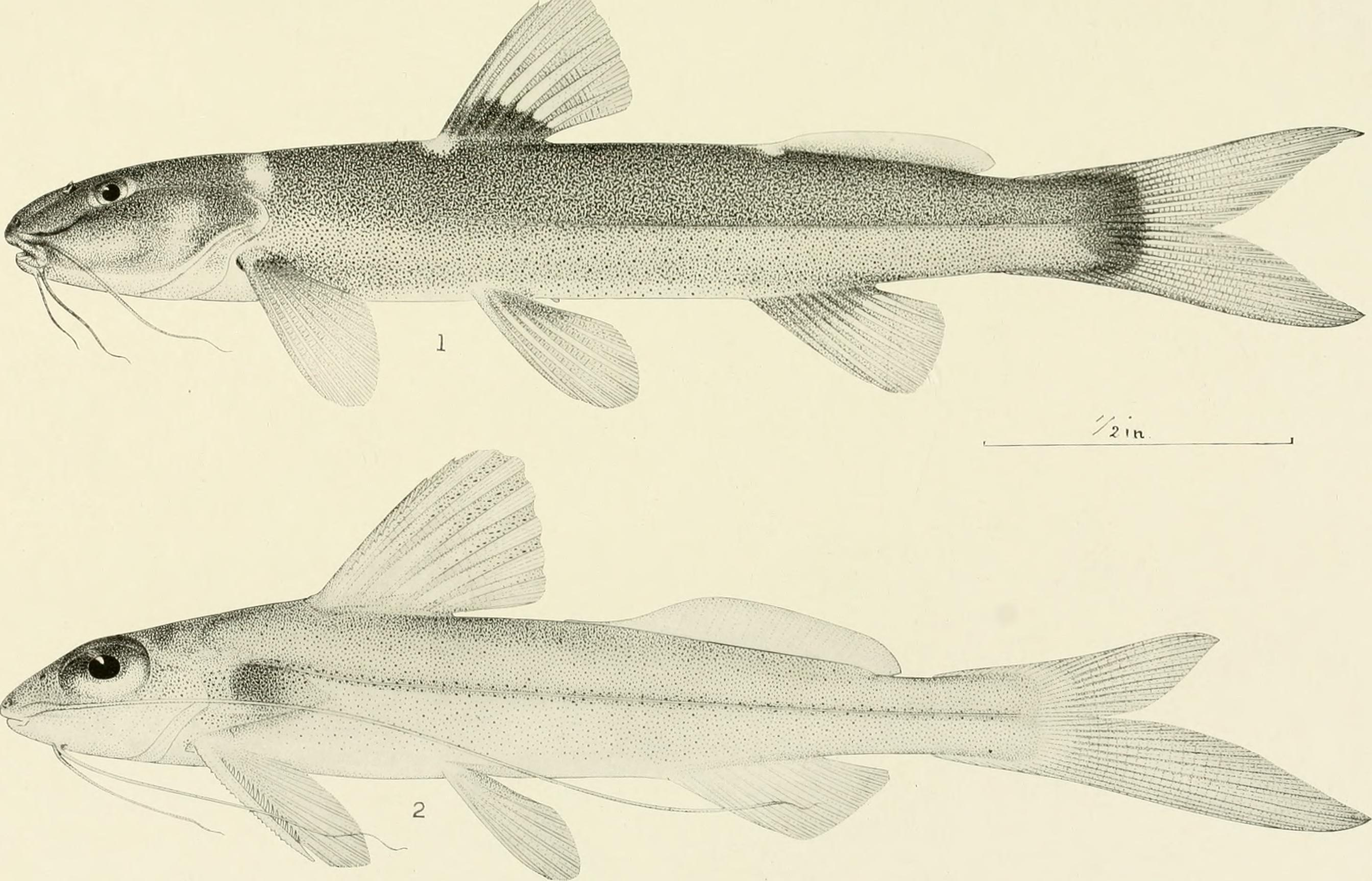
- Chasmocranus longior top

Scientific classification
- Kingdom: Animalia
- Phylum: Chordata
- Class: Actinopterygii
- Order: Siluriformes
- Family: Heptapteridae
- Genus: Chasmocranus; C. H. Eigenmann, 1912

Type species
- Chasmocranus longior Eigenmann, 1912

Species
- See text

= Chasmocranus =

Genus of fishes

Chasmocranus is a genus of three-barbeled catfishes native to South America.

== Species ==
There are currently 10 recognized species in this genus:

- Chasmocranus brachynema A. L. Gomes & Schubart, 1958
- Chasmocranus brevior C. H. Eigenmann, 1912
- Chasmocranus chimantanus Inger, 1956
- Chasmocranus longior C. H. Eigenmann, 1912
- Chasmocranus lopezi P. Miranda-Ribeiro, 1968
- Chasmocranus peruanus C. H. Eigenmann & N. E. Pearson, 1942
- Chasmocranus quadrizonatus N. E. Pearson, 1937
- Chasmocranus rosae C. H. Eigenmann, 1922
- Chasmocranus surinamensis (Bleeker, 1862)
- Chasmocranus truncatorostris Borodin, 1927
