= Nannoglanis =

Scientific classification
- Kingdom: Animalia
- Phylum: Chordata
- Class: Actinopterygii
- Order: Siluriformes
- Family: Heptapteridae
- Genus: Nannoglanis; Boulenger, 1887
- Species: N. fasciatus

Binomial name
- Nannoglanis fasciatus Boulenger, 1887

Synonyms
- Heptapterus fasciatus (Boulenger, 1887)

Genus of fishes

Nannoglanis fasciatus is a species of three-barbeled catfish endemic to Ecuador where it is found in the Napo River basin. This species grows to a length of 4.5 centimetres (1.8 in) SL. This species is currently the only recognized member of its genus.
