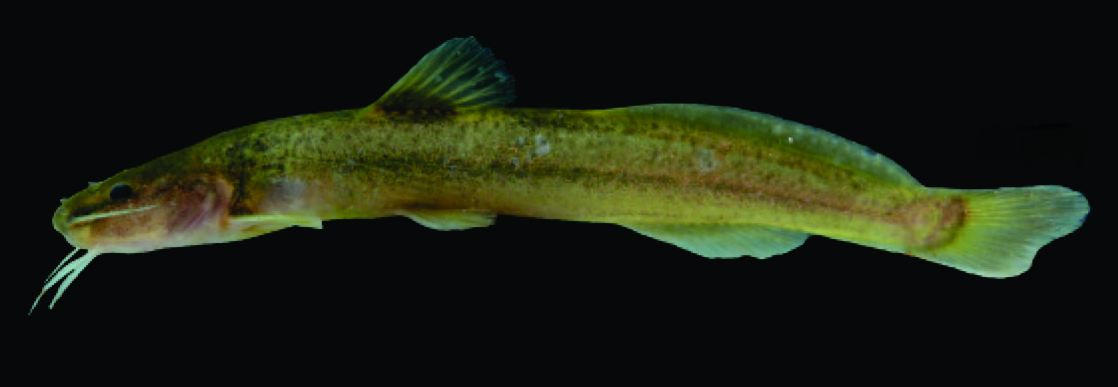
- Heptapterus sp.

Scientific classification
- Kingdom: Animalia
- Phylum: Chordata
- Class: Actinopterygii
- Order: Siluriformes
- Family: Heptapteridae
- Genus: Heptapterus; Bleeker, 1858

Type species
- Pimelodus mustelinus Valenciennes, 1835

Species
- See text

= Heptapterus =

Genus of fishes

Heptapterus is a genus of three-barbeled catfishes native to South America.

== Species ==
There are currently 17 recognized species in this genus:

- Heptapterus bleekeri Boeseman, 1953
- Heptapterus carmelitanorum Azevedo-Santos, Deprá, Aguilera, Faustino-Fuster & Katz, 2022
- Heptapterus carnatus Faustino‐Fuster, Bockmann & Malabarba, 2019
- Heptapterus exilis Faustino‐Fuster, Bockmann & Malabarba, 2019
- Heptapterus fissipinnis A. Miranda-Ribeiro, 1911
- Heptapterus hollandi (Haseman, 1911)
- Heptapterus longicauda (Boulenger, 1887)
- Heptapterus mandimbusu Aguilera, Benitez, Terán, Alonso & Mirande, 2017
- Heptapterus mbya Azpelicueta, Aguilera & Mirande, 2011
- Heptapterus multiradiatus R. Ihering (pt), 1907
- Heptapterus mustelinus (Valenciennes, 1835)
- Heptapterus ornaticeps C. G. E. Ahl, 1936
- Heptapterus panamensis (Bussing, 1970)
- Heptapterus qenqo Aguilera, Mirande & Azpelicueta, 2011
- Heptapterus stewarti Haseman, 1911
- Heptapterus sympterygium Buckup, 1988
- Heptapterus tapanahoniensis Mees, 1967
