= Rhinotocinclus chromodontus =

Conservation status
- Least Concern (IUCN 3.1)

Scientific classification
- Kingdom: Animalia
- Phylum: Chordata
- Class: Actinopterygii
- Order: Siluriformes
- Family: Loricariidae
- Genus: Rhinotocinclus
- Species: R. chromodontus

Binomial name
- Rhinotocinclus chromodontus (Britski & Garavello, 2007)

Synonyms
- Hisonotus chromodontus Britskii & Garavello, 2007

Species of catfish

Rhinotocinclus chromodontus is a species of freshwater ray-finned fish belonging to the family Loricariidae, the suckermouth armoured catfishes, and the subfamily Hypoptopomatinae, the cascudinhos. This catfish is endemic to Brazil.

== Taxonomy ==
Rhinotocinclus chromodontus was first formally described as Hisonotus chromodontus in 2007 by the Brazilian ichthyologists Heraldo A. Britski and Julio C. Garavello with its type locality given as creek no. 1, tributary of the Preto River, on road to São Francisco do Guaporé in the Arinos River drainage, around 14°18'S, 56°20'W, Diamantino municipality in the Brazilian state of Mato Grosso. In 2022 it was transferred to the newly proposed genus Rhinotocinclusby Roberto Esser dos Reis and Pablo César Lehmann Albornoz. Eschmeyer's Catalog of Fishes classified the genus Rhinotocinclus in the subfamily Hypoptopomatinae, the cascudinhos, within the suckermouth armored catfish family Loricariidae.

== Etymology ==
Rhinotocinclus chromodontus is classified in the genus Rhinotocinclus, this name combines rhinos, which is the genitive of rhis, meaning "beak" or "snout", an allusion to the "conspicuous and elegant" snout of the type species, with the name of the related genus Otocinclus. The specific name, chromodontus, means "coloured tooth", a reference to the teeth being tipped with red colour.

== Description ==
Rhinotocinclus chromodontus has teeth which are tipped with red. The body is elongated and reaches a standard length of 3.3 cm (1.3 in).

== Distribution and habitat ==
Rhinotocinclus chromodontus is endemic to Brazil, having a wide distribution in the upper and middle Tapajós River, with records in the upper Xingu River, in the state of Mato Grosso. IOt occurs in clear streams with sandy beds, marginal vegetation and little current.
