= Rhinotocinclus collinsae =

Conservation status
- Least Concern (IUCN 3.1)

Scientific classification
- Kingdom: Animalia
- Phylum: Chordata
- Class: Actinopterygii
- Order: Siluriformes
- Family: Loricariidae
- Genus: Rhinotocinclus
- Species: R. collinsae

Binomial name
- Rhinotocinclus collinsae (Schmidt & Ferraris, 1985)

Synonyms
- Parotocinclus collinsae Schmidt & Ferraris, 1985

Species of catfish

Rhinotocinclus collinsae is a species of freshwater ray-finned fish belonging to the family Loricariidae, the suckermouth armoured catfishes, and the subfamily Hypoptopomatinae. This catfish is endemic to Guyana.

== Taxonomy ==
Rhinotocinclus collinsae was first formally described as Parotocinclus collinsae in 1985 by the American ichthyologists Robert E. Schmidt and Carl J. Ferraris Jr. with its type locality given as tributary to Takutu River, at 6°15'N, 59°5'W, Cuyuni-Mazaruni, in the drainage of the Essequibo River, Guyana. In 2022 it was transferred to the newly proposed genus Rhinotocinclus by Roberto Esser dos Reis and Pablo César Lehmann Albornoz. Eschmeyer's Catalog of Fishes classified the genus Rhinotocinclus in the subfamily Hypoptopomatinae, the cascudinhos, within the suckermouth armored catfish family Loricariidae.

== Etymology ==
Rhinotocinclus collinsae is classified in the genus Rhinotocinclus: this name combines rhinos, which is the genitive of rhis, meaning "beak" or "snout", an allusion to the "conspicuous and elegant" snout of the type species, with the name of the related genus Otocinclus. The specific name, collinsae, honours the African-American child prodigy, entomologist and civil rights activist Margaret S. Collins, who enabled Schmidt to collect fishes at her field station. Collins was given the nickname "the termite lady", as she researched these insects for much of her career, and she was the first African-American person to be honoured with an eponym in the binomial of a fish.

== Description ==
Rhinotocinclus collinsae has 21 or 22 plates along the lateral line, 25 teeth on the premaxilla and dentary, an abdomen which is covered in a regular row of plates and one light and two dark saddle marks on the back, with one dark mark between the dorsal and adipose fin and the other between the adipose fin and the caudal fin. The body is elongated and reaches a standard length of 3.35 cm (1.32 in).

== Distribution and habitat ==
Rhinotocinclus collinsae is endemic to Guyana where it has been recorded from tributaries of the Cuyuni-Mazaruni river system, as well as from Kuribrong River, the Potaro River at the rapids region, and Siparuni River, all within the Essequibo drainage basin. The type series of this species was collected in a stream with a moderate gradient in the Takutu Highlands at around 300 m (980 ft) above sea level where the substrate was sand and there were many fallen trees in the stream.
