= Brachyrhamdia =

Scientific classification
- Domain: Eukaryota
- Kingdom: Animalia
- Phylum: Chordata
- Class: Actinopterygii
- Order: Siluriformes
- Family: Heptapteridae
- Genus: Brachyrhamdia; G. S. Myers, 1927

Type species
- Brachyrhamdia imitator G. S. Myers, 1927

Species
- See text.

Genus of fishes

Brachyrhamdia is a genus of three-barbeled catfishes native to South America.

== Species ==
There are currently six recognized species in this genus:

- Brachyrhamdia heteropleura (C. H. Eigenmann, 1912)
- Brachyrhamdia imitator G. S. Myers, 1927
- Brachyrhamdia marthae Sands & B. K. Black, 1985
- Brachyrhamdia meesi Sands & B. K. Black, 1985
- Brachyrhamdia rambarrani (H. R. Axelrod & W. E. Burgess, 1987)
- Brachyrhamdia thayeria Slobodian & Bockmann, 2013
