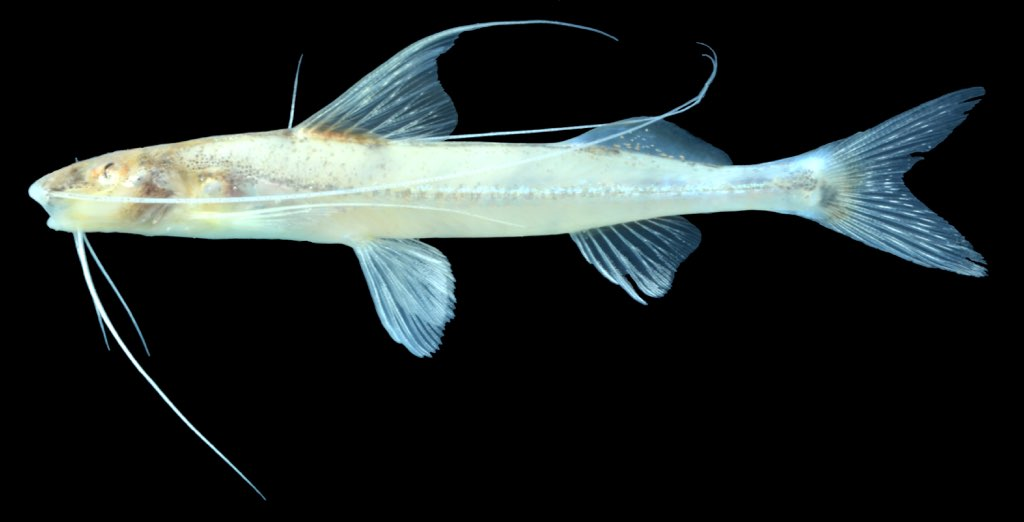
- Mastiglanis asopos

Scientific classification
- Kingdom: Animalia
- Phylum: Chordata
- Class: Actinopterygii
- Order: Siluriformes
- Superfamily: Pimelodoidea
- Family: Heptapteridae; T. N. Gill, 1861

Genera
- Acentronichthys; Brachyglanis; Brachyrhamdia; Cetopsorhamdia; Chasmocranus; Gladioglanis; Goeldiella; Heptapterus; Horiomyzon; Imparfinis; Leptorhamdia; Mastiglanis; Myoglanis; Nannoglanis; Nemuroglanis; Pariolius; Phenacorhamdia; Phreatobius; Pimelodella; Rhamdella; Rhamdia; Rhamdioglanis; Rhamdiopsis; Taunayia

= Heptapteridae =

Family of fishes

The Heptapteridae, or three-barbeled catfishes, are a family of catfish that originate from the Americas. The name Heptapteridae is derived from Greek, hepta meaning seven and pteron meaning fin; this is thought to be an allusion to the short distance between the adipose and caudal fins of Heptapterus mustelinus, the type species of the family's type genus, which gives the appearance that it has 7 instead of 8 fins in total. (Note: The eight fins typical of fish are the pectoral pair, the pelvic pair, the dorsal, the adipose, the anal, and the caudal fins.)

The skin of these fish is usually naked (scaleless). They exhibit three pairs of barbels. They have a large adipose fin, and their caudal fin is deeply forked. However, no external characteristics unique to this family allow it to be differentiated from the Pimelodidae.

Most species are restricted to South America, but Imparfinis lineatus, Nemuroglanis panamensis and Pimelodella chagresi are native to Panama, and Rhamdia species occur as far north as Mexico. The Heptapteridae include a few troglobitic species in the genera Pimelodella, Rhamdia, Rhamdiopsis, and Taunayia.

The diversity of this family is poorly known, and many species are yet to be described. So far, some 211 species have been described. This family is equivalent to the previously recognized Rhamdiinae, a subfamily of the family Pimelodidae; it was elevated to family level due to being considered distinct. Molecular evidence suggests this family is a part of the superfamily Pimelodoidea along with the Pimelodidae, Pseudopimelodidae, and Conorhynchos.

The following cladogram is based on a Maximum likelihood phylogenetic analysis of Heptapteridae using ultraconserved elements. Notably, many sequences are of undescribed species, and a number of genera are found to be polyphyletic:

- - Pseudopimelodidae
  - Pimelodidae
- - Conorhynchos conirostris
  - Heptapteridae
    - Rhamdiinae
      ⊞
      ⊟
      - Goeldiella eques
      - - - Pimelodella cf. cruxenti
          - Rhamdia
        - - Pimelodella lateristriga
          - - - Brachyrhamdia n. sp. 1
              - Pimelodella montana
            - - Pimelodella cristata
              - Pimelodella avanhandavae
    - Heptapterinae
      - Brachyglaniini
        ⊞
        ⊟
        - Gladioglanis
        - - Myoglanis
          - - Leptorhamdia
            - Brachyglanis
      - Heptapterini
        ⊞
        ⊟
        - Mastiglanis
        - - Chasmocranus
          - - - Cetopsorhamdia
              - - Pariolius
                - Phenacorhamdia
            - - - - "Imparfinis" stictonotus
                  - Nemuroglanis
                - - Imparfinis n. sp. 3
                  - - Imparfinis minutus
                    - Imparfinis n. spp.
              - - - Rhamdioglanis
                  - Taunayia
                - - Acentronichthys
                  - - Rhamdiopsis n. sp. 1
                    - - "Imparfinis" borodini
                      - - Heptapterus mustelinus
                        - Heptapterus mandimbusu
