= Epactionotus =

Scientific classification
- Kingdom: Animalia
- Phylum: Chordata
- Class: Actinopterygii
- Order: Siluriformes
- Family: Loricariidae
- Subfamily: Hypoptopomatinae
- Genus: Epactionotus; Reis & Schaefer, 1998

Type species
- Epactionotus bilineatus Reis & Schaefer, 1998

Species
- 5 species (see text)

Genus of fishes

Epactionotus is a genus of freshwater ray-finned fishes belonging to the family Loricariidae, the mailed catfishes, and the subfamily Hypoptopomatinae, the cascudinhos. The fishes in this genus are known from southeastern Brazil and northern Argentina.

== Taxonomy ==
Epactionotus was first proposed as a genus in 1998 by Roberto E. Reis and Scott A. Schaefer, as including three species, with E. bilineatus designated as its type species. Epactionotus is considered by some authorities to be part of the tribe Otothyrini within the subfamily Hypoptopomatini. Epactionotus is sister to a clade including Eurycheilichthys, Pseudotocinclus, Microlepidogaster, Schizolecis, Otothyris, and Pseudotothyris. E. yasi was described in 2004, with a fifth species described in 2020.

== Species ==
Epactionotus contains the following valid species:

- Epactionotus advenus Delapieve, Carvalho and R. E. dos Reis, 2020
- Epactionotus bilineatus R. E. dos Reis & Schaefer, 1998
- Epactionotus gracilis R. E. dos Reis & Schaefer, 1998
- Epactionotus itaimbezinho R. E. dos Reis & Schaefer, 1998

== Distribution ==
The first three described Epactionotus species are each endemic to a very limited geographic area along the Atlantic coast of southern Brazil. E. bilineatus is endemic to the Rio Maquiné, the Rio Três Forquilhas and its tributaries in Rio Grande do Sul State, southern Brazil. E. itaimbezinho is endemic to two localities in the upper reaches of the Rio Mampituba drainage, an isolated coastal stream situated along the border between Rio Grande do Sul and Santa Catarina States, southern Brazil. E. gracilis is endemic to the Araranguá River drainage, an isolated coastal drainage in southern Santa Catarina State. E. yasi is only known from the arroyo Lobo, a tributary of the Iguazu River in Argentina.

== Description ==
These fish are small, none surpassing 4 centimetres (1.6 in) SL. The head have longitudinal light-colored stripe markings which may extend onto the body over a base green color. The body is covered by bony plates except for a few areas. E. yasi is differentiated from the other species by a vent completely covered by platelets. The adipose fin is absent. The lips are small and round and form a suckermouth. Maxillary barbels are short. Odontodes are present on the head and trunk and are generally uniform in size and distribution.

== Ecology ==
The habitats of most of these species are similar. These fish are found in shallow, small rivers or creeks with bottom composed of rocks, loose stones, and gravel (and may also include sand and mud) and clear water with slow to moderate current. Water is usually very cold in the austral (southern) winter. Grass or other vegetation is always present on the stream margins. The fishes are usually found on leaves and stalks of marginal vegetation, frequently adhering by means of their pelvic fins. E. yasi lives among terrestrial vegetation that falls into the water.
