= Eurycheilichthys =

Scientific classification
- Kingdom: Animalia
- Phylum: Chordata
- Class: Actinopterygii
- Order: Siluriformes
- Family: Loricariidae
- Subfamily: Hypoptopomatinae
- Genus: Eurycheilichthys; Reis & Schaefer, 1993

Type species
- Eurycheilus pantherinus Reis & Schaefer, 1992

Species
- see text

Synonyms
- Eurycheilus; Reis & Schaefer, 1992

Genus of fishes

Eurycheilichthys is a genus of freshwater ray-finned fishes belonging to the family Loricariidae, the mailed catfishes, and the subfamily Hypoptopomatinae, the cascudinhos. The catfishes in this genus are found in South America.

== Taxonomy ==
Eurycheilichthys was originally proposed as the genus Eurycheilus in 1992 by Roberto Esser dos Reis and Scott A. Schaefer when they described Eurycheilus pantherinus. However, Eurycheilus was preoccupied in fossil cephalopods, and therefore was replaced by Eurycheilichthys in 1993. A second species, E. limulus, was described in 1998, with more species described in 2017.

Eurycheilichthys together with Pseudotocinclus, Microlepidogaster, Schizolecis, Otothyris and Pseudotothyris form a clade whose sister group is Epactionotus.

== Species ==
Eurycheilichthys contains the following valid species:

- Eurycheilichthys apocremnus Reis, 2017
- Eurycheilichthys castaneus Reis, 2017
- Eurycheilichthys coryphaenus Reis, 2017
- Eurycheilichthys limulus Reis & Schaefer, 1998
- Eurycheilichthys luisae Reis, 2017
- Eurycheilichthys pantherinus (Reis & Schaefer, 1992)
- Eurycheilichthys paucidens Reis, 2017
- Eurycheilichthys planus Reis, 2017
- Eurycheilichthys vacariensis Reis, 2017

== Distribution ==
All species in this native to Brazil. However, Eurycheilichthys pantherinus's range extends into Argentina.

== Description ==
The species of Eurycheilichthys are similar. The trunk and caudal peduncle are round in cross section. Males have a fleshy flap along the posterior margin of the thickened first pelvic fin ray. They lack a dorsal fin locking mechanism. Both species lack an adipose fin. Their bodies are almost entirely covered by plates. The body and head lack crests. The head and body plates are covered with odontodes; these are larger on the ventral face of pelvic and pectoral fin spines. Odontodes on the head and trunk are otherwise of uniform size and distribution, and not arranged in conspicuous rows. The lips are roundish, wide and papillose. The maxillary barbels are short.

E. limulus shares with E. pantherinus a single synapomorphy: the derived presence of seven branched pectoral fin rays. E. limulus is distinguished from E. pantherinus by a more narrow body, head and dorsal trunk with series of longitudinal light stripes (versus scattered dark blotches), and presence of an accessory ceratobranchial flange and filamentous gill rakers (versus absence of those features in E. pantherinus).

== Ecology ==
E. pantherinus inhabits shady, fast-flowing, shallow water, ranging from approximately 200–500 metres (660–1,640 ft) in elevation. The substratum is predominantly stones, with little or no macrophytes.

The habitat at the type locality of E. limulus is a small river about 3–5 metres (9.8–16.4 ft) wide with moderate water current, bottom comprising some rocks but mostly sand and a large amount of marginal vegetation. These fishes live among leaves and stalks.
