= Otothyropsis marapoama =

Conservation status
- Least Concern (IUCN 3.1)

Scientific classification
- Kingdom: Animalia
- Phylum: Chordata
- Class: Actinopterygii
- Division: Teleostei
- Order: Siluriformes
- Family: Loricariidae
- Genus: Otothyropsis
- Species: O. marapoama

Binomial name
- Otothyropsis marapoama Ribeiro, Carvalho & Melo, 2005

Species of fish

Otothyropsis marapoama is a species of freshwater ray-finned fish belonging to the family Loricariidae, the suckermouth armored catfishes, and the subfamily Hypoptopomatinae, the cascudinhos. This catfish is endemic to Brazil.

== Taxonomy ==
Otothyropsis marapoama was first formally described in 2005 by Alexandre Cunha Ribeiro, Murilo de Carvalho and Alex Luiz de Andrade Melo with its type locality given as the Tietê River basin in the Municípality of Marapoama, at the Cubatão River, road between Marapoama and Elisiárioat 21°11'35"S, 49°07'22"W. When they described this species they classified it in the new genus Otothyropsis, which is, by some authorities, classified in the tribe Otothyrini within the subfamily Hypoptopomatinae. Within this tribe, it represents a clade along with the genera Schizolecis, Otothyris and Pseudotothyris, which share unique specializations of the cranium associated with an enlarged swimbladder capsule. The degree of development of the swimbladder capsule in these genera was not found in any other member of the Otothyrini. Otothyropsis has a sister group relationship with the clade Otothyris plus Pseudotothyris. This genus is classified in the subfamily Hypoptopomatinae, the cascudinhos, in the suckermouth armored catfish family Loricariidae, in the suborder Loricarioidei on the catfish order Siluriformes.

== Distribution ==
This fish is known from the Tietê River, a tributary of the Paraná River of southeastern Brazil. The region where this species is found is one of the most heavily impacted by anthropogenic activities in Brazil, and the lack of previous records of such a distinctive fish suggests a high degree of endemism as well as vulnerability.

== Appearance and anatomy ==
O. marapoama reaches a maximum of about 4 centimetres (1.6 in) SL. Otothyropsis differs from closely related genera in its pattern of odontode growth, which grows under the snout unlike in other genera. Also, the body and abdomen is almost entirely covered in armor plates, which differs from closely related species which have less armor on the belly. These fish have round lips that form a suckermouth with maxillary barbels.
