= Pseudotothyris ignota =

Scientific classification
- Kingdom: Animalia
- Phylum: Chordata
- Class: Actinopterygii
- Division: Teleostei
- Order: Siluriformes
- Family: Loricariidae
- Genus: Pseudotothyris
- Species: P. ignota

Binomial name
- Pseudotothyris ignota Martins, Britski & Langeani, 2014

Species of armored catfish

Pseudotothyris ignota is a species of freshwater ray-finned fish belonging to the family Loricariidae, the suckermouth armoured catfishes, and the subfamily Hypoptopomatinae, the cascudinhos. This catfish is endemic to Brazil.

== Taxonomy ==
Pseudotothyris ignota was first formally described in 2014 by the Brazilian ichthyologists Fernanda de Oliveira Martins, Heraldo Antonio Britski and Francisco Langeani-Neto with its type locality given as a stream tributary to Acaraí Lake, São Francisco do Sul at 26°17'33"S, 48°35'21"W in the Brazilian state of Santa Catarina. Eschmeyer's Catalog of Fishes classified the genus Pseudotothyris in the subfamily Hypoptopomatinae, the cascudinhos, within the suckermouth armored catfish family Loricariidae.

== Etymology ==
Pseudotothyris ignota is classified in the genus Pseudotothyris, this name prefixes pseudo-, meaning “false”, onto Otothyris, as these fishes appear to bear some resemblance to that genus but that resemblance is misleading. The specific name, ignota, is Latin meaning "forgotten" or "ignored", because this species was misidentified as P. obtusa from 1911.

== Description ==
Pseudotothyris ignota has its dorsal fin with 8 or 9 soft rays with 6 in its anal fin. This species is told apart from other species in its genus by having a band on the snout which is naked, i.e. with no odontodes. It has a higher number of teeth than P, obtusa, while the presence of three bands on the back, the lack of a spinelet, the typical possession of a plate below the eye and the randomly distributed odontodes on the plates along the lateral line as opposed to being set out in neat rows, distinguish this species from P. janeirensis. This species has an elongated body and it reaches a standard length of 3.3 cm (1.3 in).

== Distribution and habitat ==
Pseudotothyris ignota is endemic to Brazil where it is found in coastal drainages from Iguape in the state of São Paulo to São João do Rio Vermelho in the state of Santa Catarina state, it is sympatric with P. obtusa in coastal drainages in Iguape, Cananéia and Ilha Comprida, which are next to the basin of the Ribeira de Iguape River basin.
