= Epactionotus gracilis =

Conservation status
- Least Concern (IUCN 3.1)

Scientific classification
- Kingdom: Animalia
- Phylum: Chordata
- Class: Actinopterygii
- Order: Siluriformes
- Family: Loricariidae
- Genus: Epactionotus
- Species: E. gracilis

Binomial name
- Epactionotus gracilis R. E. dos Reis & Schaefer, 1998

Species of catfish

Epactionotus gracilis is a species of freshwater ray-finned fishes belonging to the family Loricariidae, the mailed catfishes, and the subfamily Hypoptopomatinae, the cascudinhos. This catfish is endemic to Brazil where it occurs in coastal drainages in the south of the Brazilian state of Santa Catarina. This species was first formally described in 1998, along with E. bilineatus and E. itaimbezinho, by Roberto Esser dos Reis and Scott Allen Schaefer when they proposed the new genus Epactionotus. This species reaches a standard length of 3.9 cm (1.5 in)
