= Epactionotus itaimbezinho =

Conservation status
- Least Concern (IUCN 3.1)

Scientific classification
- Kingdom: Animalia
- Phylum: Chordata
- Class: Actinopterygii
- Order: Siluriformes
- Family: Loricariidae
- Genus: Epactionotus
- Species: E. itaimbezinho

Binomial name
- Epactionotus itaimbezinho R. E. dos Reis & Schaefer, 1998

Species of catfish

Epactionotus itaimbezinho is a species of freshwater ray-finned fishes belonging to the family Loricariidae, the mailed catfishes, and the subfamily Hypoptopomatinae, the cascudinhos. This catfish is endemic to Brazil where it occurs only in the Mampituba River basin, a coastal drainage in the border area between the Brazilian states of Rio Grande do Sul and Santa Catarina. This species was first formally described in 1998, along with E. bilineatus and E. gracilis, by Roberto Esser dos Reis and Scott Allen Schaefer when they proposed the new genus Epactionotus. This species reaches a standard length of 3.8 cm (1.5 in)
