= Eurycheilichthys limulus =

Conservation status
- Least Concern (IUCN 3.1)

Scientific classification
- Kingdom: Animalia
- Phylum: Chordata
- Class: Actinopterygii
- Order: Siluriformes
- Family: Loricariidae
- Genus: Eurycheilichthys
- Species: E. limulus

Binomial name
- Eurycheilichthys limulus Reis & Schaefer, 1998

Species of fish

Eurycheilichthys limulus is a species of freshwater ray-finned fish belonging to the family Loricariidae, the suckermouth armoured catfishes, and the subfamily Hypoptopomatinae, the cascudinhos. This catfish occurs only in the upper Jacuí River, part of the Guaíba River system, it is found on the plateau in the state of Rio Grande do Sul, at altitides in excess of 600 m (2,000 ft). The habitat at the type locality of E. limulus is a small river about 3–5 m (9.8–16.4 ft) wide with moderate water current, bottom comprising some rocks but mostly sand and a large amount of marginal vegetation. These fishes live among leaves and stalks. This species grows to a standard length of 4.8 cm (1.9 in) .
