= Otothyris travassosi =

Conservation status
- Least Concern (IUCN 3.1)

Scientific classification
- Kingdom: Animalia
- Phylum: Chordata
- Class: Actinopterygii
- Order: Siluriformes
- Family: Loricariidae
- Genus: Otothyris
- Species: O. travassosi

Binomial name
- Otothyris travassosi Garavello, Britski & Schaefer, 1998

Species of fish

Otothyris travassosi is a species of freshwater ray-finned fish belonging to the family Loricariidae, the suckermouth armored catfishes, and the subfamily Hypoptopomatinae, the cascudinhos. This catfish is found in South America, where it is occurs in the coastal drainages of the states of Bahia, Espírito Santo and Minas Gerais, Brazil. The species reaches a standard length of 3.2 cm (1.3 in).

The specific name of this fish honors the Brazilian scientist Haroldo P. Travassos of the Museu Nacional of Brazil, for his contributions to Brazilian ichthyology and assistance with the authors’ studies of fish.
