= Nannoptopoma sternoptychum =

Conservation status
- Least Concern (IUCN 3.1)

Scientific classification
- Kingdom: Animalia
- Phylum: Chordata
- Class: Actinopterygii
- Order: Siluriformes
- Family: Loricariidae
- Genus: Nannoptopoma
- Species: N. sternoptychum

Binomial name
- Nannoptopoma sternoptychum Schaefer, 1996

Synonyms
- Hypoptopoma sternoptychum (Schaefer, 1996)

Species of fish

Nannoptopoma sternoptychum is a species of freshwater ray-finned fish belonging to the family Loricariidae, the suckermouth armored catfishes, and the subfamily Hypoptopomatinae. the cascudinhos. This catfish is found in the upper Amazon basin in Ecuador and Peru, and the Amazon basin, including the Upper Madeira River in Bolivia, Brazil and Peru, as well as in the Orinoco in Colombia. This species reaches a maximum standard length of 3.3 cm (1.3 in).
