= Hypoptopoma bianale =

Conservation status
- Least Concern (IUCN 3.1)

Scientific classification
- Kingdom: Animalia
- Phylum: Chordata
- Class: Actinopterygii
- Order: Siluriformes
- Family: Loricariidae
- Genus: Hypoptopoma
- Species: H. bianale

Binomial name
- Hypoptopoma bianale Aquino & Schaefer, 2010

Species of fish

Hypoptopoma bianale is a species of freshwater ray-finned fish belonging to the family Loricariidae, the suckermouth armored catfishes, and the subfamily Hypoptopomatinae. the cascudinhos. This catfish occurs in the Solimões River in Brazil and Colombia and the Ucayali River in Peru. This species reaches a total length of 5.4 cm (2.1 in). The specific name honors prefixes anale, meanin "of the anus", with bi, meaning "two", a reference to the two anal plates.
