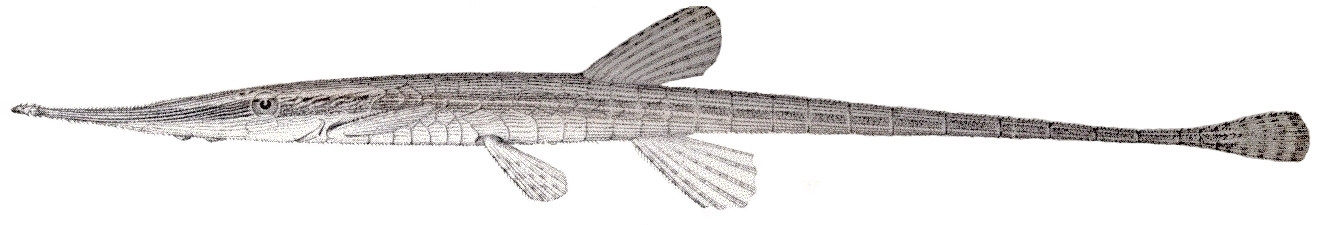
- Acestridium discus

Scientific classification
- Kingdom: Animalia
- Phylum: Chordata
- Class: Actinopterygii
- Order: Siluriformes
- Family: Loricariidae
- Subfamily: Hypoptopomatinae
- Genus: Acestridium; Haseman, 1911

Type species
- Acestridium discus Haseman, 1911

Species
- see text

= Acestridium =

Genus of fishes

Acestridium is a genus of freshwater ray-finned fishes belonging to the family Loricariidae, the mailed catfishes, and the subfamily Hypoptopomatinae, the cascudinhos. The catfishes in this genus are found in South America.

== Taxonomy ==
Acestridium was first proposed as a monospecific genus in 1911 by the American ichthyologist John Diederich Haseman when he described Acestridium discus, meaning that A. discus is the type species of this genus by monotypy. The genus is sometimes classified in the tribe Hypoptopomatini. A study in 2015 found that Acestridium was the sister taxon to Niobichthys and that the clade formed by these two genera formed a sister taxon to the clade comprising Oxyropsis and Hypoptopoma. This subfamily is classified within the subfamily Hypoptopomatinae, sometimes called cascudinhos, of the suckermouth armoured catfish family Loricariidae, in the suborder Loricarioidei of the catfish order Siluriformes.

== Etymology ==
Acestridium suffixes the Latin diminutive -idium, indicating similarity, onto the Greek akestra, which means "needle", this is assumed to be an allusion to the long spines at the tip of the snout of the type species, A. discus.

== Species ==
Acestridium contains the following valid recognized species:

- Acestridium colombiense Retzer, 2005
- Acestridium dichromum Retzer, Nico & Provenzano, 1999
- Acestridium discus Haseman, 1911
- Acestridium gymnogaster Reis & Lehmann, A, 2009
- Acestridium martini Retzer, Nico & Provenzano, 1999
- Acestridium scutatum Reis & Lehmann, A. 2009
- Acestridium triplax Rodríguez & Reis, 2007

== Distribution and habitat ==
Acestridium species are native to small streams of the Amazon region of Brazil, Venezuela, and Colombia. Species of this genus are found in litter banks.

== Characteristics ==
Members of this genus typically are long and thin, or 'twiglike' and superficially resemble the genus Farlowella of the same family. Adult length is 5–7 cm (2.0–2.8 in) and each species shows adaptation for camouflage in the water margins - bright green leaf like in Acestridium dichromum and variegated brown in other species.
