= Hypoptopoma muzuspi =

Conservation status
- Least Concern (IUCN 3.1)

Scientific classification
- Kingdom: Animalia
- Phylum: Chordata
- Class: Actinopterygii
- Order: Siluriformes
- Family: Loricariidae
- Genus: Hypoptopoma
- Species: H. muzuspi

Binomial name
- Hypoptopoma muzuspi Aquino & Schaefer, 2010

Species of fish

Hypoptopoma muzuspi is a species of freshwater ray-finned fish belonging to the family Loricariidae, the suckermouth armored catfishes, and the subfamily Hypoptopomatinae. the cascudinhos. This catfish is endemic to Brazil where it is known only from the basin of the Agua Fria River, a tributary of the Araguaia River, in the state of Mato Grosso. This species reaches a total length of 6 cm (2.4 in). The specific name refers to the Museu de Zoologia, Universidade de São Paulo (MZUSP), which holds one of the leading ichthyological collections in South America.
