= Eurycheilichthys pantherinus =

Conservation status
- Least Concern (IUCN 3.1)

Scientific classification
- Kingdom: Animalia
- Phylum: Chordata
- Class: Actinopterygii
- Order: Siluriformes
- Family: Loricariidae
- Genus: Eurycheilichthys
- Species: E. pantherinus

Binomial name
- Eurycheilichthys pantherinus (Reis & Schaefer, 1992)

Synonyms
- Eurycheilus pantherinus Reis & Schaefer, 1992

Species of fish

Eurycheilichthys pantherinus is a species of freshwater ray-finned fish belonging to the family Loricariidae, the suckermouth armoured catfishes, and the subfamily Hypoptopomatinae, the cascudinhos. This catfish occurs in the upper and middle Uruguay River basin in Brazil and Argentina. It inhabits shady, fast-flowing, shallow water, ranging from approximately 200–500 m (660–1,640 ft) in elevation. The substratum is predominantly stones, with little or no macrophytes. This species grows to a standard length of 4.2 centimetres (1.7 in). This species was forst formally described as Eurycheilus pantherinus in 1992 by Roberto Esser dos Reis and Scott A. Schaefer with its type locality given as a creek which is a tributary of the Rio Dos Touros, at approximately 28°42'S, 50°10'W in Rio Grande do Sul. When Reis and Schaefer described this species they placed it in the new monospecific genus Eurycheilus. However, Eurycheilus was preoccupied by a fossil genus of cephalopods, and therefore was replaced by Eurycheilichthys in 1993. E. pamtherinus is the type species of Eurycheilichthys by monotypy.
