= Hypoptopoma elongatum =

Conservation status
- Least Concern (IUCN 3.1)

Scientific classification
- Kingdom: Animalia
- Phylum: Chordata
- Class: Actinopterygii
- Order: Siluriformes
- Family: Loricariidae
- Genus: Hypoptopoma
- Species: H. elongatum

Binomial name
- Hypoptopoma elongatum Aquino & Schaefer, 2010

Species of fish

Hypoptopoma elongatum is a species of freshwater ray-finned fish belonging to the family Loricariidae, the suckermouth armored catfishes, and the subfamily Hypoptopomatinae. The cascudinhos. This catfish is endemic to Brazil where it is found in the basins of the Tapajós and Trombetas Rivers in the state of Pará. This species reaches a total length of 10.2 cm (4.0 in).
