= Hypoptopoma brevirostratum =

Conservation status
- Least Concern (IUCN 3.1)

Scientific classification
- Kingdom: Animalia
- Phylum: Chordata
- Class: Actinopterygii
- Order: Siluriformes
- Family: Loricariidae
- Genus: Hypoptopoma
- Species: H. brevirostratum

Binomial name
- Hypoptopoma brevirostratum Aquino & Schaefer, 2010

Species of fish

Hypoptopoma brevirostratum is a species of freshwater ray-finned fish belonging to the family Loricariidae, the suckermouth armored catfishes, and the subfamily Hypoptopomatinae. the cascudinhos. This catfish occurs in the Amazon basin in Brazil, Colombia, Ecuador and Peru. This species reaches a total length of 5.1 cm (2.0 in).
