= Pareiorhaphis nudulus =

Scientific classification
- Domain: Eukaryota
- Kingdom: Animalia
- Phylum: Chordata
- Class: Actinopterygii
- Order: Siluriformes
- Family: Loricariidae
- Genus: Pareiorhaphis
- Species: P. nudulus

Binomial name
- Pareiorhaphis nudulus (Reis & Pereira, 1999)

Synonyms
- Hemipsilichthys nudulus

Species of catfish

Pareiorhaphis nudulus is a species of catfish in the family Loricariidae. It is native to South America, where it occurs in the drainage basins of the Araranguá River, the Mampituba River, the Maquiné River, and the Três Forquilhas River in the states of Santa Catarina and Rio Grande do Sul in Brazil. It is typically seen in small, shallow rivers with clear water, moderate to strong current, and rocky substrates. The species reaches 3.4 cm (1.3 inches) in standard length and is believed to be a facultative air-breather.
