= Hypoptopoma incognitum =

Conservation status
- Least Concern (IUCN 3.1)

Scientific classification
- Kingdom: Animalia
- Phylum: Chordata
- Class: Actinopterygii
- Division: Teleostei
- Order: Siluriformes
- Family: Loricariidae
- Genus: Hypoptopoma
- Species: H. incognitum

Binomial name
- Hypoptopoma incognitum Aquino & Schaefer, 2010

Species of fish

Hypoptopoma incognitum is a species of freshwater ray-finned fish belonging to the family Loricariidae, the suckermouth armored catfishes, and the subfamily Hypoptopomatinae. the cascudinhos. This catfish is found in the Amazon basin in Bolivia and Brazil, and has also been recorded from the Tocantins River and the Pindaré River in Brazil. This species reaches a standard length of 10.8 cm (4.3 in).
