= Hypoptopoma steindachneri =

Conservation status
- Least Concern (IUCN 3.1)

Scientific classification
- Kingdom: Animalia
- Phylum: Chordata
- Class: Actinopterygii
- Order: Siluriformes
- Family: Loricariidae
- Genus: Hypoptopoma
- Species: H. steindachneri

Binomial name
- Hypoptopoma steindachneri Boulenger, 1895

Species of fish

Hypoptopoma steindachneri is a species of freshwater ray-finned fish belonging to the family Loricariidae, the suckermouth armored catfishes, and the subfamily Hypoptopomatinae. the cascudinhos. This catfish is found in the Ucayali River, Solimões River amd Madeira river basins in Brazil, Colombia, Peru and Venezuela. This species reaches a standard length of 10 cm (3.9 in). The specific name honors the Austrian ichthyologist Franz Steindachner who first illustrated this species as H. thoracatum.
