= Otothyris rostrata =

Conservation status
- Least Concern (IUCN 3.1)

Scientific classification
- Kingdom: Animalia
- Phylum: Chordata
- Class: Actinopterygii
- Order: Siluriformes
- Family: Loricariidae
- Genus: Otothyris
- Species: O. rostrata

Binomial name
- Otothyris rostrata Garavello, Britski & Schaefer, 1998

Species of fish

Otothyris rostrata is a species of freshwater ray-finned fish belonging to the family Loricariidae, the suckermouth armored catfishes, and the subfamily Hypoptopomatinae, the cascudinhos. This catfish is found in South America, where it is occurs in coatsal drainages in the Brazilian states of Santa Catarina and Rio Grande do Sul, southwards into Uruguay. The species reaches a standard length of 3.1 cm (1.2 in).
