= Epactionotus bilineatus =

Conservation status
- Least Concern (IUCN 3.1)

Scientific classification
- Kingdom: Animalia
- Phylum: Chordata
- Class: Actinopterygii
- Order: Siluriformes
- Family: Loricariidae
- Genus: Epactionotus
- Species: E. bilineatus

Binomial name
- Epactionotus bilineatus R. E. dos Reis & Schaefer, 1998

Species of fish

Epactionotus bilineatus is a species of freshwater ray-finned fishes belonging to the family Loricariidae, the mailed catfishes, and the subfamily Hypoptopomatinae, the cascudinhos. This catfish is endemic to Brazil where it occurs in the Tramandaí River basin, in the middle and upper reaches of the Três Forquilhas and Maquiné rivers, and their tributaries, in the state of Rio Grande do Sul. This species was first formally described in 1998 by Roberto Esser dos Reis and Scott Allen Schaefer when they proposed the new genus Epactionotus. They described three new species in that genus, designating E. bilineatus as its type species. This species reaches a standard length of 4 cm (1.6 in)
