= Otothyropsis biamnicus =

Conservation status
- Least Concern (IUCN 3.1)

Scientific classification
- Kingdom: Animalia
- Phylum: Chordata
- Class: Actinopterygii
- Order: Siluriformes
- Family: Loricariidae
- Genus: Otothyropsis
- Species: O. biamnicus

Binomial name
- Otothyropsis biamnicus Calegari, Lehmann A. & Reis, 2013

Species of catfish

Otothyropsis biamnicus is a species of freshwater ray-finned fish belonging to the family Loricariidae, the suckermouth armored catfishes, and the subfamily Hypoptopomatinae, the cascudinhos. This catfish is endemic to Brazil where it has been recorded from tributaries of the Iguaçu River, the Tibagi River and in the Penacho stream, municipality of Ribeirão do Pinhal, which is a small right bank tributary of the Laranjinha River, in the Brazilian states of Paraná and Santa Catarina. This species reaches a standard length of 4 cm (1.6 in). The specific name of this species, biamnicus, roughly translates to "inhabitant of two rivers", which refers to the species' distribution in both the referring to its distribution in both the Iguaçu and Tibagi basins.
