= Hypoptopoma machadoi =

Conservation status
- Least Concern (IUCN 3.1)

Scientific classification
- Kingdom: Animalia
- Phylum: Chordata
- Class: Actinopterygii
- Order: Siluriformes
- Family: Loricariidae
- Genus: Hypoptopoma
- Species: H. machadoi

Binomial name
- Hypoptopoma machadoi Aquino & Schaefer, 2010

Species of fish

Hypoptopoma machadoi is a species of freshwater ray-finned fish belonging to the family Loricariidae, the suckermouth armored catfishes, and the subfamily Hypoptopomatinae. the cascudinhos. This catfish is found in the middle and upper Orinoco basin in Colombia and Venezuela. This species reaches a standard length of 7 cm (2.8 in). The specific name honors Antonio Machado-Allison of the Universidad Central de Venezuela, because of his lifelong dedication and contributions to neotropical ichthyology.
