= Hypoptopoma baileyi =

Conservation status
- Least Concern (IUCN 3.1)

Scientific classification
- Kingdom: Animalia
- Phylum: Chordata
- Class: Actinopterygii
- Order: Siluriformes
- Family: Loricariidae
- Genus: Hypoptopoma
- Species: H. baileyi

Binomial name
- Hypoptopoma baileyi Aquino & Schaefer, 2010

Species of fish

Hypoptopoma baileyi is a species of freshwater ray-finned fish belonging to the family Loricariidae, the suckermouth armored catfishes, and the subfamily Hypoptopomatinae. the cascudinhos. This catfish occurs in Bolivia and Brazil where it has been recorded from the Itenez River in the upper Madeira River basin and in the Matos River, part of the Mamoré River basin. This species attains a total length of 4.4 cm (1.7 in). The specific name honors Reeve Maclaren Bailey who helped collect the type series.
