= Otothyris juquiae =

Conservation status
- Critically Endangered (IUCN 3.1)

Scientific classification
- Kingdom: Animalia
- Phylum: Chordata
- Class: Actinopterygii
- Order: Siluriformes
- Family: Loricariidae
- Genus: Otothyris
- Species: O. juquiae

Binomial name
- Otothyris juquiae Garavello, Britski & Schaefer, 1998

Species of fish

Otothyris juquiae is a species of freshwater ray-finned fish belonging to the family Loricariidae, the suckermouth armored catfishes, and the subfamily Hypoptopomatinae, the cascudinhos. This catfish is found in South America, where it is only known from the Juquiá River, part of the Ribeira de Iguape River basin, in the municipalities of Juquiá and Registro, in São Paulo state, Brazil. The species reaches a standard length of 3.2 cm (1.3 in).
