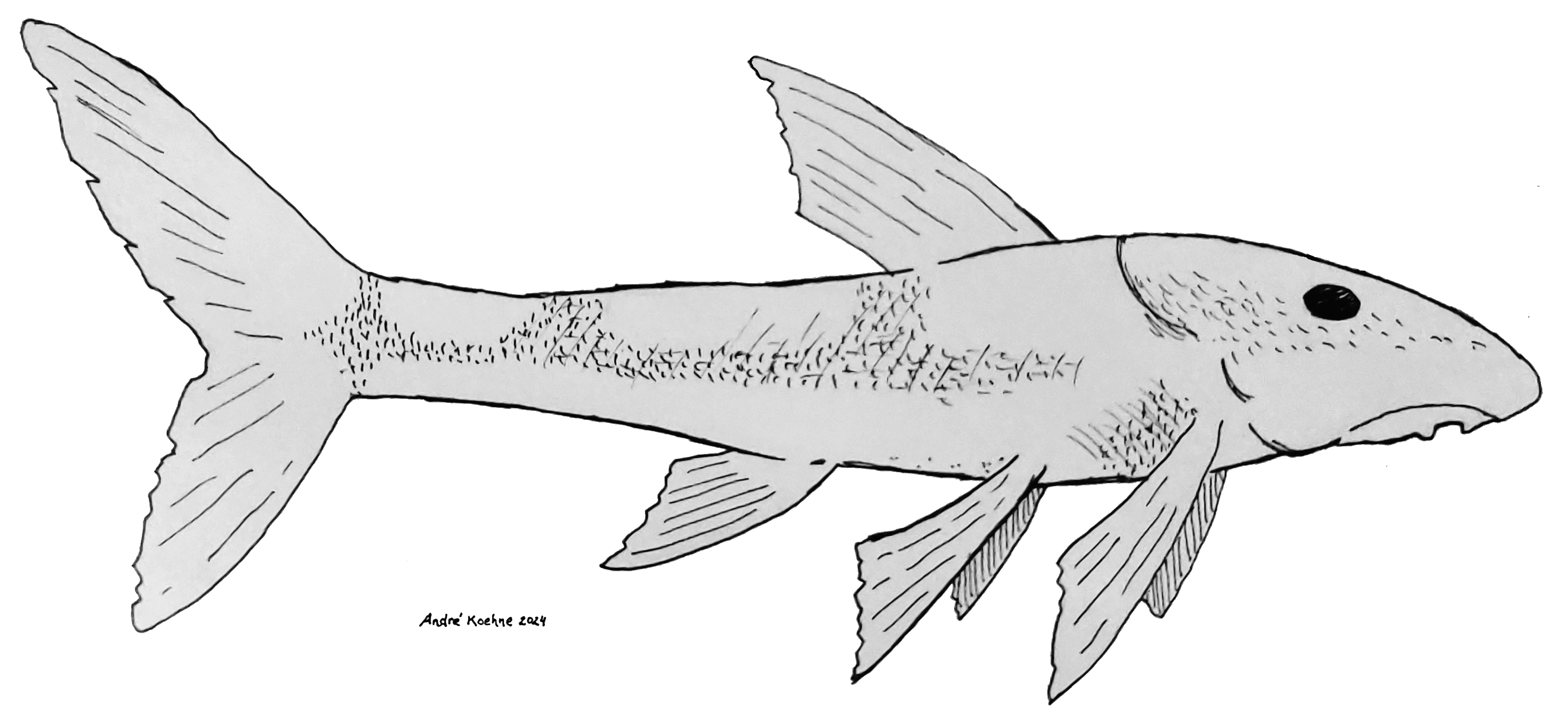

Conservation status
- Least Concern (IUCN 3.1)

Scientific classification
- Kingdom: Animalia
- Phylum: Chordata
- Class: Actinopterygii
- Order: Siluriformes
- Family: Loricariidae
- Genus: Curculionichthys
- Species: C. sagarana

Binomial name
- Curculionichthys sagarana Roxo, Silva, L. E. Ochoa & de Oliveira, 2015

= Curculionichthys sagarana =

Species of Actinopterygii

Curculionichthys sagarana is a species of freshwater ray-finned fish belonging to the family Loricariidae, the suckermouth armoured catfishes, and the subfamily Hypoptopomatinae, the cascudinhos. This catfish is found in tributary streams throughout the São Francisco River Basin in the states of Minas Gerais and Bahia. This species reaches a standard length of 2.4 cm (0.94 in) C. sagarana was described in 2015 by Fábio Fernandes Roxo, Gabriel Souza da Costa e Silva, Luz E. Ochoa, and Cláudio de Oliveira, alongside the description of the genus Curculionichthys to include several species formerly classified in the genus Hisonotus.
