= Corumbataia acanthodela =

Scientific classification
- Kingdom: Animalia
- Phylum: Chordata
- Class: Actinopterygii
- Order: Siluriformes
- Family: Loricariidae
- Genus: Corumbataia
- Species: C. acanthodela

Binomial name
- Corumbataia acanthodela Thimotheo, Benine, Oliveira & Silva, 2020

Species of fish

Corumbataia acanthodela is a species of freshwater ray-finned fish belonging to the family Loricariidae and the subfamily Hypoptopomatinae, the cascudinhos. This species was described in 2020 from the Rio Maranhão in the drainage system of the Tocantins River in central Brazil.
