= Curculionichthys luteofrenatus =

Conservation status
- Least Concern (IUCN 3.1)

Scientific classification
- Kingdom: Animalia
- Phylum: Chordata
- Class: Actinopterygii
- Order: Siluriformes
- Family: Loricariidae
- Genus: Curculionichthys
- Species: C. luteofrenatus

Binomial name
- Curculionichthys luteofrenatus (Britski & Garavello, 2007)

Synonyms
- Hisonotus luteofrenatus Britski & Garavello, 2007

Species of Actinopterygii

Curculionichthys luteofrenatus is a species of freshwater ray-finned fish belonging to the family Loricariidae, the suckermouth armoured catfishes, and the subfamily Hypoptopomatinae, the cascudinhos. This catfish is endemic to Brazil where it is found in the Brazilian state of Mato Grosso in the upper basin of the Tapajós River. C. luteofrenatus occurs in flat, shallow parts of the rivers where there is a sandy substrate and low current. This species reaches a standard length of 3.1 cm (1.2 in).
