= Pseudotothyris =

Scientific classification
- Kingdom: Animalia
- Phylum: Chordata
- Class: Actinopterygii
- Order: Siluriformes
- Family: Loricariidae
- Subfamily: Hypoptopomatinae
- Genus: Pseudotothyris; Britski & Garavello, 1984

Type species
- Otocinclus obtusus A. Miranda-Ribeiro, 1911

Genus of fishes

Pseudotothyris is a genus of freshwater ray-finned fishes belonging to the family Loricariidae, the suckermouth armoured catfishes, and the subfamily Hypoptopomatinae, the cascudinhos. The catfishes in this genus are endemic to Brazil.

== Taxonomy ==
Pseudotothyris was first formally proposed as a genus in 1984 by the Brazilian ichthyologists Heraldo A. Britski and Julio C. Garavello with Otocinclus obtusus, a species described by Alípio de Miranda Ribeiro in 1911 with its type locality given as Fonte Grande, a seedling nursery in Pedrinhas on Ilha Comprida in the Brazilian state of São Paulo, designated as its type species. Eschmeyer's Catalog of Fishes classified the genus Pseudotocinclus in the subfamily Hypoptopomatinae, the cascudinhos, within the suckermouth armored catfish family Loricariidae.

Some authorities place this genus in the tribe Otothyrini, in which Pseudotothyris has a sister group relationship with Otothyris. In turn, Otothyropsis has a sister group relationship with the clade Otothyris plus Pseudotothyris. These three genera and Schizolecis share unique specializations of the cranium associated with an enlarged swimbladder capsule. The degree of development of the swimbladder capsule in these genera was not found in any other member of the Otothyrini.

== Etymology ==
Pseudotothyris this name prefixes pseudo-, meaning “false”, onto Otothyris, as these fishes appear to bear some resemblance to that genus but that resemblance is misleading.

== Species ==
Pseudotothyris contains the following valid species;

- Pseudotothyris ignota Martins, Britski & Langeani, 2014
- Pseudotothyris janeirensis Britski & Garavello, 1984
- Pseudotothyris obtusa (Miranda Ribeiro 1911)

== Characteristics ==
Pseudotothyris are characterised by having short bodies, eyes placed on the side of the head with the orbit created by the three bones which surround it. There are three large plates border the lower part of the head ate its rear. The tip of thes nout has small odontodes on it. That these odontodes are only well developed on the upper part of the snout is the characteristic which is shared by the species in this genus and which characterise it.

== Distribution ==
Pseudotothyris catfishes are found in coastal basins in southern and southeastern Brazil between the states of Rio de Janeiro and Santa Catarina.
