= Pseudotocinclus juquiae =

Conservation status
- Critically Endangered (IUCN 3.1)

Scientific classification
- Kingdom: Animalia
- Phylum: Chordata
- Class: Actinopterygii
- Order: Siluriformes
- Family: Loricariidae
- Genus: Pseudotocinclus
- Species: P. juquiae

Binomial name
- Pseudotocinclus juquiae Takako, de Oliveira & Oyakawa, 2005

Species of fish

Pseudotocinclus juquiae is a species of freshwater ray-finned fish belonging to the family Loricariidae, the suckermouth armoured catfishes, and the subfamily Hypoptopomatinae, the cascudinhos. This catfish is endemic to Brazil.

== Taxonomy ==
Pseudotocinclus juquiae was first formally described in 2005 by the Brazilian ichthyologists Adriana Kazue Takako, Claudio de Oliveira and Osvaldo Takeshi Oyakawa with its type locality given as the first tributary of Juquiá River, near ribeirão das Antas on road from São Lourenço da Serra to Juquitiba at 23°59', 49.1"S. 46°56'01.1"W, Juquitiba, in the Brazilian state of São Paulo, from an elevation of 670 m (2,200 ft). Eschmeyer's Catalog of Fishes classified the genus Pseudotocinclus in the subfamily Hypoptopomatinae, the cascudinhos, within the suckermouth armored catfish family Loricariidae.

== Etymology ==
Pseudotocinclus juquiae is classified in the genus Pseudotocinclus, this name prefixes pseudo-, meaning “false”, onto Otocinclus, as these fishes appear to bear some resemblance to that genus but that resemblance is misleading. The specific name, juquiae, is a toponym, the name of the type locality being the Juquiá River, derived from the Tupí word ye’kei, a kind of fishing device.

== Description ==
Pseudotocinclus juquiae has the tip of its snout covered in small platelets, unlike P. tietensis but like P. parahybae but this species has an obvious and distinct ring on the orbit. This species reaches a standard length of 3.2 cm (1.3 in).

== Distribution and habitat ==
Pseudotocinclus juquiae is endemic to Brazil and is currently known only from its type locality, it was found in another location it has not beenn recorded there since 1989. This catfish feeds on algae and is associated with rocks, tree trunks and emergent vegetation.

== Conservation status ==
Pseudotocinclus juquiae is currently known from a single location in São Paulo state and the International Union for Conservation of Nature have assessed that pollution by domestic sewage is the main threat to this species and the area it occurs in is subject to urbanisation then this catfish is Critically Endangered.
