= Corumbataia cuestae =

Conservation status
- Least Concern (IUCN 3.1)

Scientific classification
- Kingdom: Animalia
- Phylum: Chordata
- Class: Actinopterygii
- Order: Siluriformes
- Family: Loricariidae
- Genus: Corumbataia
- Species: C. cuestae

Binomial name
- Corumbataia cuestae Britski, 1997

Species of fish

Corumbataia cuestae is a species of freshwater ray-finned fish belonging to the family Loricariidae, the suckermouth armoured catfishes, and the subfamily Hypoptopomatinae, the cascudinhos. This catfish is endemic to Brazil where it is found in small streams of the Tietê River (upper Paraná River basin) in Sao Paulo. This species grows to a standard length of 3.3 cm (1.3 in).
