= Curculionichthys paresi =

Conservation status
- Least Concern (IUCN 3.1)

Scientific classification
- Kingdom: Animalia
- Phylum: Chordata
- Class: Actinopterygii
- Order: Siluriformes
- Family: Loricariidae
- Genus: Curculionichthys
- Species: C. paresi

Binomial name
- Curculionichthys paresi (Roxo, Zawadzki & Troy, 2014)

Synonyms
- Hisonotus paresi Roxo, Zawadzki & Troy, 2014

Species of Actinopterygii

Curculionichthys paresi is a species of freshwater ray-finned fish belonging to the family Loricariidae, the suckermouth armoured catfishes, and the subfamily Hypoptopomatinae, the cascudinhos. This catfish is endemic to Brazil where it is only known from three small tributaries of the Sepotuba River, in the upper Paraguay River basin in the state of Mato Grosso. This species reaches a standard length of 2.6 cm (1.0 in). The specific name, paresi, is taken from the Paresi peoples who are found in most of Mato Grosso.
