= Nannoptopoma =

Scientific classification
- Kingdom: Animalia
- Phylum: Chordata
- Class: Actinopterygii
- Order: Siluriformes
- Family: Loricariidae
- Subfamily: Hypoptopomatinae
- Genus: Nannoptopoma; Schaefer, 1996

Type species
- Otocinclus spectabilis C. H. Eigenmann, 1914

Genus of ray-finned fishes

Nannoptopoma is a genus of freshwater ray-finned fish belonging to the family Loricariidae, the suckermouth armoured catfishes, and the subfamily Hypoptopomatinae, the cascudinhos. The catfishes in this genus are found in South America.

== Species ==
Nannoptopoma contains the following species:

- Nannoptopoma spectabile (C. H. Eigenmann, 1914)
- Nannoptopoma sternoptychum Schaefer, 1996
