= Corumbataia canoeiro =

Scientific classification
- Kingdom: Animalia
- Phylum: Chordata
- Class: Actinopterygii
- Order: Siluriformes
- Family: Loricariidae
- Genus: Corumbataia
- Species: C. canoeiro

Binomial name
- Corumbataia canoeiro (Roxo, Silva, Ochoa & Zawadzki, 2017)

Synonyms
- Gymnotocinclus canoeiro Roxo, Silva, Ochoa & Zawadzki, 2017

Species of catfish

Corumbataia canoeiro is a species of freshwater ray-finned fish belonging to the family Loricariidae, the suckermouth armoured catfishes, and the subfamily Hypoptopomatinae, the cascudinhos. This catfish occurs in the Tocantins River basin in Brazil. The species reaches at least 6.2 cm (2.4 in) in standard length. It was described in 2017 by Fábio F. Roxo (of São Paulo State University), Gabriel S. C. Silva (also of São Paulo State University), Luz Eneida Ochoa (of the University of São Paulo), and Cláudio Henrique Zawadzki (of the State University of Maringá). Its specific name, canoeiro, refers to the Avá-Canoeiro people, speakers of the Avá-Canoeiro language, who inhabit the upper Tocantins basin.
