= Corumbataia liliai =

Conservation status
- Critically Endangered (IUCN 3.1)

Scientific classification
- Kingdom: Animalia
- Phylum: Chordata
- Class: Actinopterygii
- Order: Siluriformes
- Family: Loricariidae
- Genus: Corumbataia
- Species: C. liliai

Binomial name
- Corumbataia liliai Silva & Roxo & Souza & de Oliveira, 2018

Species of fish

Corumbataia liliai is a species of freshwater ray-finned fish belonging to the family Loricariidae, the suckermouth armoured catfishes, and the subfamily Hypoptopomatinae, the cascudinhos. This catfish is endemic to Brazil, where it is found in the Upper Rio Paraná basin in Goiás. This species grows to a standard length of 2.5 cm (0.98 in).

The fish is named in honor of Lilian Maria Costa e Silva, the sister of the author Gabriel de Souza.
