= Corumbataia anosteos =

Scientific classification
- Kingdom: Animalia
- Phylum: Chordata
- Class: Actinopterygii
- Order: Siluriformes
- Family: Loricariidae
- Genus: Corumbataia
- Species: C. anosteos

Binomial name
- Corumbataia anosteos (Carvalho, Lehmann A. & Reis, 2008)

Synonyms
- Gymnotocinclus anosteos Carvalho, Lehmann A. & Reis, 2008

Species of fish

Corumbataia anosteos is a species of freshwater ray-finned fish belonging to the family Loricariidae and the subfamily Hypoptopomatinae, the cascudinhos. This species is endemic to Brazil where it is found in the Tocantinzinho River in the Tocantins River basin. This species reaches standard length of 4.4 cm (1.7 in).

This taxon was placed in the genus Gymnotocinclus as it is unusual among the Loricariidae due to its extremely reduced armor plates that are characteristic of the family, giving the fish a relatively naked body. This taxon probably has a basal position in the subfamily Hypoptopomatinae. However, Gymnotocinclus is now considered to be a synonym of Corumbataia.
