= Acestridium gymnogaster =

Conservation status
- Data Deficient (IUCN 3.1)

Scientific classification
- Kingdom: Animalia
- Phylum: Chordata
- Class: Actinopterygii
- Order: Siluriformes
- Family: Loricariidae
- Genus: Acestridium
- Species: A. gymnogaster

Binomial name
- Acestridium gymnogaster Reis & Lehmann A., 2009

Species of fish

Acestridium gymnogaster is a species of freshwater ray-finned fish belonging to the family Loricariidae, the suckermouth armored catfishes, and the subfamily Hypoptopomatinae, the cascudinos. This catfish is only known from the Traíra River, roughly 35 km (22 mi) east of the Madeira River and two other streams in the Madeira River drainage system within the municipality of Humaitá in Amazonas state.
