= Pseudotothyris obtusa =

Conservation status
- Least Concern (IUCN 3.1)

Scientific classification
- Kingdom: Animalia
- Phylum: Chordata
- Class: Actinopterygii
- Order: Siluriformes
- Family: Loricariidae
- Genus: Pseudotothyris
- Species: P. obtusa

Binomial name
- Pseudotothyris obtusa (Miranda-Ribeiro, 1911)

Synonyms
- Otocinclus obtusus Miranda Ribeiro, 1911

Species of fish

Pseudotothyris obtusa is a species of freshwater ray-finned fish belonging to the family Loricariidae, the suckermouth armoured catfishes, and the subfamily Hypoptopomatinae, the cascudinhos. This catfish is endemic to Brazil.

== Taxonomy ==
Pseudotothyris obtusa was first formally described as Otocinclus obtusus in 1911 by the Brazilian ichthyologist and herpetologist Alípio de Miranda-Ribeiro in 1911 with its type locality given as Fonte Grande, a seedling nursery in Pedrinhas on Ilha Comprida in the Brazilian state of São Paulo. In 1984 the Brazilian ichthyologists Heraldo A. Britski and Julio C. Garavello proposed the new genus Pseudotothyris and designated Otocinclus obtusus as its type species. Eschmeyer's Catalog of Fishes classified the genus Pseudotothyris in the subfamily Hypoptopomatinae, the cascudinhos, within the suckermouth armored catfish family Loricariidae.

== Etymology ==
Pseudotothyris obtusa is classified in the genus Pseudotothyris, this name prefixes pseudo-, meaning “false”, onto Otothyris, as these fishes appear to bear some resemblance to that genus but that resemblance is misleading. The specific name, obtusa, is Latin meaning "blunt" or "dull", Ribeiro did not explain this but it may be an allusion to the small platelet on teh snout whivh have small, so blunter, spines on them.

== Description ==
Pseudotothyris obtusa has its dorsal fin between with 8 and 10 soft rays with 6 or 7 in its anal fin. This species is told apart from other species in its genus by having fewer pharyngeal teeth, a snout covered in plates and having scattered plates on the abdomen instead of having a completely naked abdome. It also lacks any saddle marks and has the odontodes on the lateral plates neatly arranged in rows. This species reaches a standard length of 4 cm (1.6 in).

== Distribution and habitat ==
Pseudotothyris obtusa is endemic to Brazil where it is found in coastal drainages in the southeast of that country from São Sebastião in the Brazilian state of São Paulo to Ilha de Superagui, Paranaguá Bay in the state of in Paraná. It is found among emergent vegetation, fallen wood and leaf litter.
