= Epactionotus advenus =

Scientific classification
- Kingdom: Animalia
- Phylum: Chordata
- Class: Actinopterygii
- Order: Siluriformes
- Family: Loricariidae
- Genus: Epactionotus
- Species: E. advenus

Binomial name
- Epactionotus advenus Delapieve, Carvalho & Reis, 2020

Species of catfish

Epactionotus advenus is a species of freshwater ray-finned fishes belonging to the family Loricariidae, the mailed catfishes, and the subfamily Hypoptopomatinae, the cascudinhos. This catfish is endemic to Brazil where it occurs in the Biguaçu River basin in the state of Santa Catarina. This species reaches a standard length of at least 3.54 cm (1.39 in). It was described in 2020 as part of a review of the genus Epactionotus conducted by Maria Laura S. Delapieve, Tiago Pinto Carvalho and Roberto E. Reis.
