= Acestridium triplax =

Conservation status
- Data Deficient (IUCN 3.1)

Scientific classification
- Kingdom: Animalia
- Phylum: Chordata
- Class: Actinopterygii
- Order: Siluriformes
- Family: Loricariidae
- Genus: Acestridium
- Species: A. triplax

Binomial name
- Acestridium triplax M. S. Rodriguez & R. E. dos Reis, 2007

Species of fish

Acestridium triplax is a species of freshwater ray-finned fish belonging to the family Loricariidae, the suckermouth armored catfishes, and the subfamily Hypoptopomatinae, the cascudinos. This catfish is only known from small streams, in the municipality of Juruti in the Brazilian state of Pará, which are part of the lower drainage system of the Tapajós river. This species reaches as standard length of 5.6 cm (2.2 in).
