= Corumbataia britskii =

Conservation status
- Vulnerable (IUCN 3.1)

Scientific classification
- Kingdom: Animalia
- Phylum: Chordata
- Class: Actinopterygii
- Order: Siluriformes
- Family: Loricariidae
- Genus: Corumbataia
- Species: C. britskii

Binomial name
- Corumbataia britskii Ferreira & Ribeiro, 2007

Species of fish

Corumbataia britskii is a species of freshwater ray-finned fish belonging to the family Loricariidae and the subfamily Hypoptopomatinae, the cascudinhos. This species is endemic to Brazil where it is found in small tributaries of the Sucuriú River, upper Paraná River Basin in the state of Mato Grosso do Sul. This species was found in deforested areas in moderate to fast current streams. It is associated with aquatic macrophytes or the submerged portion of marginal vegetation. In its gut contents were found filamentous blue-green algae, chlorophytes, diatoms and bark. This species grows to a standard length of 2.7 cm (1.1 in).

The fish is named in honor of Heraldo A. Britski of the Universidade de São Paulo, for his many contributions to the understanding of Hypoptopomatinae catfishes of South America.
