= Corumbataia tocantinensis =

Conservation status
- Least Concern (IUCN 3.1)

Scientific classification
- Kingdom: Animalia
- Phylum: Chordata
- Class: Actinopterygii
- Order: Siluriformes
- Family: Loricariidae
- Genus: Corumbataia
- Species: C. tocantinensis

Binomial name
- Corumbataia tocantinensis Britski, 1997

Species of fish

Corumbataia tocantinensis is a species of freshwater ray-finned fish belonging to the family Loricariidae, the suckermouth armoured catfishes, and the subfamily Hypoptopomatinae, the cascudinhos. This catfish is endemic to Brazil, where it is found in the Araguaia and Tocantins River basins in the state of Goiás. This species grows to a standard length of 3.8 cm (1.5 in).
