= Hypoptopoma psilogaster =

Conservation status
- Least Concern (IUCN 3.1)

Scientific classification
- Kingdom: Animalia
- Phylum: Chordata
- Class: Actinopterygii
- Order: Siluriformes
- Family: Loricariidae
- Genus: Hypoptopoma
- Species: H. psilogaster

Binomial name
- Hypoptopoma psilogaster Fowler, 1915

Species of fish

Hypoptopoma psilogaster is a species of freshwater ray-finned fish belonging to the family Loricariidae, the suckermouth armored catfishes, and the subfamily Hypoptopomatinae. the cascudinhos. This catfish is found in the Juruá, Japurá-Caquetá, Napo and Amazon in Brazil and Peru. This species reaches a standard length of 7 cm (2.8 in).
