= Otothyropsis alicula =

Conservation status
- Least Concern (IUCN 3.1)

Scientific classification
- Kingdom: Animalia
- Phylum: Chordata
- Class: Actinopterygii
- Order: Siluriformes
- Family: Loricariidae
- Genus: Otothyropsis
- Species: O. alicula

Binomial name
- Otothyropsis alicula Lippert, Calegari & R. E. dos Reis, 2014

Species of catfish

Otothyropsis alicula is a species of freshwater ray-finned fish belonging to the family Loricariidae, the suckermouth armored catfishes, and the subfamily Hypoptopomatinae, the cascudinhos. This catfish is endemic to Brazil where it is only known from three locations within the Sapucaí River basin, a tributary of the Sapucaí River, upper Rio Grande drainage, which itself is a tributary of the Paraná River, in the state of Minas Gerais. This species reaches a standard length of 3.6 cm (1.4 in). O. alcina was first formally described in 2014 by Beatriz G. Lippert, Bárbara B. Calegari, and Roberto E. Reis on the basis of morphology and coloration.
