= Curculionichthys oliveirai =

Conservation status
- Least Concern (IUCN 3.1)

Scientific classification
- Kingdom: Animalia
- Phylum: Chordata
- Class: Actinopterygii
- Order: Siluriformes
- Family: Loricariidae
- Genus: Curculionichthys
- Species: C. oliveirai

Binomial name
- Curculionichthys oliveirai (Roxo, Zawadzki & Troy, 2014)

Synonyms
- Hisonotus oliveirai Roxo, Zawadzki & Troy, 2014

Species of Actinopterygii

Curculionichthys oliveirai is a species of freshwater ray-finned fish belonging to the family Loricariidae, the suckermouth armoured catfishes, and the subfamily Hypoptopomatinae, the cascudinhos. This catfish is endemic to Brazil where it is known only from four small to medium-sized streams, tributaries of the Rio Ivaí, in the upper Paraná River basin in the state of Paraná. This species reaches a standard length of 2.8 cm (1.1 in) in males and 3 cm (1.2 in) in females. The specific name honours Claudio Oliveira in recognition of his work on Neotropical ichthyology.
