= Curculionichthys piracanjuba =

Conservation status
- Least Concern (IUCN 3.1)

Scientific classification
- Kingdom: Animalia
- Phylum: Chordata
- Class: Actinopterygii
- Order: Siluriformes
- Family: Loricariidae
- Genus: Curculionichthys
- Species: C. piracanjuba

Binomial name
- Curculionichthys piracanjuba (Martins & Langeani, 2012)

Synonyms
- Hisonotus piracanjuba Martins & Langeani, 2012

Species of Actinopterygii

Curculionichthys piracanjubais a species of freshwater ray-finned fish belonging to the family Loricariidae, the suckermouth armoured catfishes, and the subfamily Hypoptopomatinae, the cascudinhos. This catfish is endemicto Brazil where it has a wide distribution in the drainage of the Paranaíba River in the upper Paraná River basin, states of Minas Gerais, Goiás and the Federal District. This species reaches a standard length of 2.7 cm (1.1 in).
