= Otothyris lophophanes =

Conservation status
- Least Concern (IUCN 3.1)

Scientific classification
- Kingdom: Animalia
- Phylum: Chordata
- Class: Actinopterygii
- Order: Siluriformes
- Family: Loricariidae
- Genus: Otothyris
- Species: O. lophophanes

Binomial name
- Otothyris lophophanes (C. H. Eigenmann & R. S. Eigenmann, 1889)

Synonyms
- Rhinelepis lophophanes C. H. Eigenmann & R. S. Eigenmann, 1889; Otocinclus lophophanes (C. H. Eigenmann & R. S. Eigenmann, 1889); Microlepidogaster lophophanes (C. H. Eigenmann & R. S. Eigenmann, 1889); Otocinclus cephalacanthus A. Miranda-Ribeiro 1911; Otothyris canaliferus Myers 1927

Species of fish

Otothyris lophophanes is a species of freshwater ray-finned fish belonging to the family Loricariidae, the suckermouth armored catfishes, and the subfamily Hypoptopomatinae, the cascudinhos. This catfish is found in South America, where it is endemic to the coastal drainages of the state of Rio de Janeiro, Brazil. The species reaches a standard length of 2.8 cm (1.1 in).
