= Curculionichthys karipuna =

Conservation status
- Least Concern (IUCN 3.1)

Scientific classification
- Kingdom: Animalia
- Phylum: Chordata
- Class: Actinopterygii
- Order: Siluriformes
- Family: Loricariidae
- Genus: Curculionichthys
- Species: C. karipuna

Binomial name
- Curculionichthys karipuna Silva, Roxo, Melo & Oliveira, 2016

Species of Actinopterygii

Curculionichthys karipuna is a species of freshwater ray-finned fish belonging to the family Loricariidae, the suckermouth armoured catfishes, and the subfamily Hypoptopomatinae, the cascudinhos. This catfish occurs in rivers in the Guiana Shield in French Guiana and the Brazilian state of Amapá, it has been recorded from the Cassiporé River, an Atlantic coastal drainage in northern Amapá, and in tributaries of the Jari River and Amapari River in Brazil and from the Oyapock and Approuague basins in French Guiana. The species reaches a standard length of 2.4 cm (0.94 in). C. karipuna was described in 2016 by Gabriel S. C. Silva, Fábio F. Roxo, and Claudio Oliveira of São Paulo State University and Bruno F. Melo of the American Museum of Natural History.
