= Corumbataia veadeiros =

Conservation status
- Least Concern (IUCN 3.1)

Scientific classification
- Kingdom: Animalia
- Phylum: Chordata
- Class: Actinopterygii
- Order: Siluriformes
- Family: Loricariidae
- Genus: Corumbataia
- Species: C. veadeiros

Binomial name
- Corumbataia veadeiros Carvalho, 2008

Species of fish

Corumbataia veadeiros is a species of freshwater ray-finned fish belonging to the family Loricariidae, the suckermouth armoured catfishes, and the subfamily Hypoptopomatinae, the cascudinhos. This catfish is endemic to Brazil, where it is found in tributaries of the Rio das Almas and the Ribeirão dos Bois, both of which are tributaries of the Rio Paranã, in the headwaters of the Rio Tocantins basin, Goiás, central Brazil. This species grows to a length of 3.68 centimetres (1.45 in) SL.
