= Pseudotocinclus parahybae =

Conservation status
- Near Threatened (IUCN 3.1)

Scientific classification
- Kingdom: Animalia
- Phylum: Chordata
- Class: Actinopterygii
- Order: Siluriformes
- Family: Loricariidae
- Genus: Pseudotocinclus
- Species: P. parahybae

Binomial name
- Pseudotocinclus parahybae Takako, de Oliveira & Oyakawa, 2005

Species of fish

Pseudotocinclus parahybae is a species of freshwater ray-finned fish belonging to the family Loricariidae, the suckermouth armoured catfishes, and the subfamily Hypoptopomatinae, the cascudinhos. This catfish is endemic to Brazil.

== Taxonomy ==
Pseudotocinclus parahybae was first formally described in 2005 by the Brazilian ichthyologists Adriana Kazue Takako, Claudio de Oliveira and Osvaldo Takeshi Oyakawa with its type locality given as a tributary of riberão Grande at Fazenda São Sebastião do Ribeirão Grande, in the Paraíba do Sul basin, at around 22°46'S, 45°27'W, Pindamonhangaba in the Brazilian state of São Paulo. Eschmeyer's Catalog of Fishes classified the genus Pseudotocinclus in the subfamily Hypoptopomatinae, the cascudinhos, within the suckermouth armored catfish family Loricariidae.

== Etymology ==
Pseudotocinclus parahybae is classified in the genus Pseudotocinclus, this name prefixes pseudo-, meaning “false”, onto Otocinclus, as these fishes appear to bear some resemblance to that genus but that resemblance is misleading. The specific name, parahybae, means "of Paraiba", the Paraiba do Sul river basin contains te type locality, derived from the Tupí word which means "useless river", applied to an unnavigable stetch of the river.

== Description ==
Pseudotocinclus parahybae has the tip of its snout covered in small platelets, unlike P. tietensis but like P. juquiae but this species does not have the obvious and distinct ring on the orbit that P juquiae shows. This species reaches a standard length of 66.4 mm (2.61 in).

== Distribution and habitat ==
Pseudotocinclus parahybae is endemic to Brazil being found in the tributary of the Ribeirão Grande, Fazenda São Sebastião do Ribeirão Grande, Paraíba do Sul river basin, in the minicipality of Pindamonhangaba in the state of São Paulo. It has also been recorded from the Buenos stream, in the Buenos basin in the minicipality of Guaratinguetá, also in the state of São Paulo. It is thought that this catfish mey have a wider distribution in the streams draing from the mosaic of conserved natural habitat in the hills between the states of São Paulo and Rio de Janeiro, however, there have been very few ichthyological collections in this area. The types were collected from a stream between 0.5 to 1.5 m (1 ft 8 in to 4 ft 11 in) in depth and which was 5 m (16 ft) in width, at 800 m (2,600 ft) above sea level, on the slopes of the Mantiqueira Mountains, with very clear, well-oxygenated water and a flowing fast over a rocky bed.

== Conservation status ==
Pseudotocinclus parahybae is endemic to the Paraíba do Sul river basin, with only a few records, all from the state of São Paulo, and is considered naturally rare and scarce. Within this basin there is high degree of degradation which indirectly threaten this species, and these cannot yet be quantified, but there is a continued decline in habitat quality. However, there is no data on severe population fragmentation or the number of locations; thusthe International Union for Conservation of Nature has categorised this species as Near Threatened, albeit approaching the Endangered.
