= Acestridium scutatum =

Conservation status
- Data Deficient (IUCN 3.1)

Scientific classification
- Kingdom: Animalia
- Phylum: Chordata
- Class: Actinopterygii
- Order: Siluriformes
- Family: Loricariidae
- Genus: Acestridium
- Species: A. scutatum

Binomial name
- Acestridium scutatum Reis & Lehmann A., 2009

Species of fish

Acestridium scutatum is a species of freshwater ray-finned fish belonging to the family Loricariidae, the suckermouth armored catfishes, and the subfamily Hypoptopomatinae, the cascudinos. This catfish is endemic to Brazil where it is only known from the Traíra River, a small river near Humaitá in the Madeira River basin,on the Trans-Amazonian Highway in Amazonas.
