= Curculionichthys sabaji =

Scientific classification
- Kingdom: Animalia
- Phylum: Chordata
- Class: Actinopterygii
- Order: Siluriformes
- Family: Loricariidae
- Genus: Curculionichthys
- Species: C. sabaji

Binomial name
- Curculionichthys sabaji Roxo, Silva, L. E. Ochoa & de Oliveira, 2015

Species of Actinopterygii

Curculionichthys sabaji is a species of freshwater ray-finned fish belonging to the family Loricariidae, the suckermouth armoured catfishes, and the subfamily Hypoptopomatinae, the cascudinhos. This catfish is found in the basin of the Xingu River in Brazil. This species reaches a standard lengthof 2.4 cm (0.94 in). C. sabaji was first formally described in 2015 by Fábio Fernandes Roxo, Gabriel de Souza da Costa e Silva, Luz Eneida Ochoa Orrego and Claudio Oliveira with its type locality given as the Municipality of Altamira, Rio 13 de Maio, Rio Curuá, in the Rio Iriri drainage in the state of Pará at 8°43'41"S, 55°01'38"W.

== Etymology ==
The catfish is named in honor of Mark Sabaj Pérez (b. 1969), the Collection Manager, Ichthyology, Academy of Natural Sciences of Philadelphia, for his dedication and contributions to study of Neotropical fishes, especially those from the rio Xingu basin.
