= Pseudotothyris janeirensis =

Conservation status
- Near Threatened (IUCN 3.1)

Scientific classification
- Kingdom: Animalia
- Phylum: Chordata
- Class: Actinopterygii
- Order: Siluriformes
- Family: Loricariidae
- Genus: Pseudotothyris
- Species: P. janeirensis

Binomial name
- Pseudotothyris janeirensis Britski & Garavello, 1984

Species of fish

Pseudotothyris janeirensis is a species of freshwater ray-finned fish belonging to the family Loricariidae, the suckermouth armoured catfishes, and the subfamily Hypoptopomatinae, the cascudinhos. This catfish is endemic to Brazil.

== Taxonomy ==
Pseudotothyris janeirensis was first formally described in 1984 by the Brazilian ichthyologists Heraldo Antonio Britski and Julio C. Garavello with its type locality given as a Rio dos Macacos, Engenho da Serra Dam, Paulo Frontin in the Brazilian state of Rio de Janeiro. Eschmeyer's Catalog of Fishes classified the genus Pseudotothyris in the subfamily Hypoptopomatinae, the cascudinhos, within the suckermouth armored catfish family Loricariidae.

== Etymology ==
Pseudotothyris janeirensis is classified in the genus Pseudotothyris, this name prefixes pseudo-, meaning “false”, onto Otothyris, as these fishes appear to bear some resemblance to that genus but that resemblance is misleading. The specific name, janeirensis, suffixes -ensis onto janeiro, denoting that this fish is from the state of Rio de Janeiro, where the type locality is located.

== Description ==
Pseudotothyris janeirensis has its dorsal fin with 8 or 9 soft rays with 5 or 6 in its anal fin. This species is told apart from other species in its genus by having a spinelet in the dorsal fin, no dark bands across the back, it never has a cheek plate below the eye and the odontodes on the lateral plates are arranged in clearly defined series. This species has an elongated body and it reaches a standard length of 5 cm (2.0 in).

== Distribution and habitat ==
Pseudotothyris janeirensis is endemic to Brazil where it is an uncommon species found in coastal rivers in the state of Rio de Janeiro.

== Conservation status ==
Pseudotothyris janeirensis is uncommon and little known but the area it occurs in is subject to habitat degradation, and although there is little information on its biology. ecology, population or distribution the International Union for Conservation of Nature have classified this species as Near Threatened.
