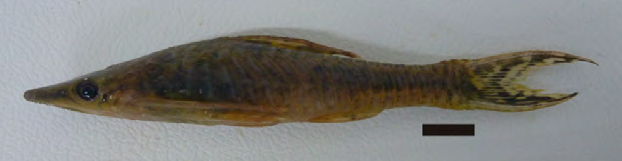
- Scale bar = 1 cm

Conservation status
- Least Concern (IUCN 3.1)

Scientific classification
- Kingdom: Animalia
- Phylum: Chordata
- Class: Actinopterygii
- Order: Siluriformes
- Family: Loricariidae
- Genus: Hypoptopoma
- Species: H. gulare

Binomial name
- Hypoptopoma gulare Cope, 1878

Synonyms
- Otocinclus joberti Vaillant, 1880; Hypoptopoma joberti (Valiiant, 1880)

= Hypoptopoma gulare =

Species of catfish

Hypoptopoma gulare is a species of freshwater ray-finned fish belonging to the family Loricariidae, the suckermouth armored catfishes, and the subfamily Hypoptopomatinae. the cascudinhos. This catfish is found in the middle and upper Amazon basin in Bolivia, Brazil, Colombia and Peru. This species reaches a standard length of 10.5 cm (4.1 in). It is sometimes seen in the aquarium trade, where it is referred to as the giant otocinclus, despite not belonging to the genus Otocinclus.
