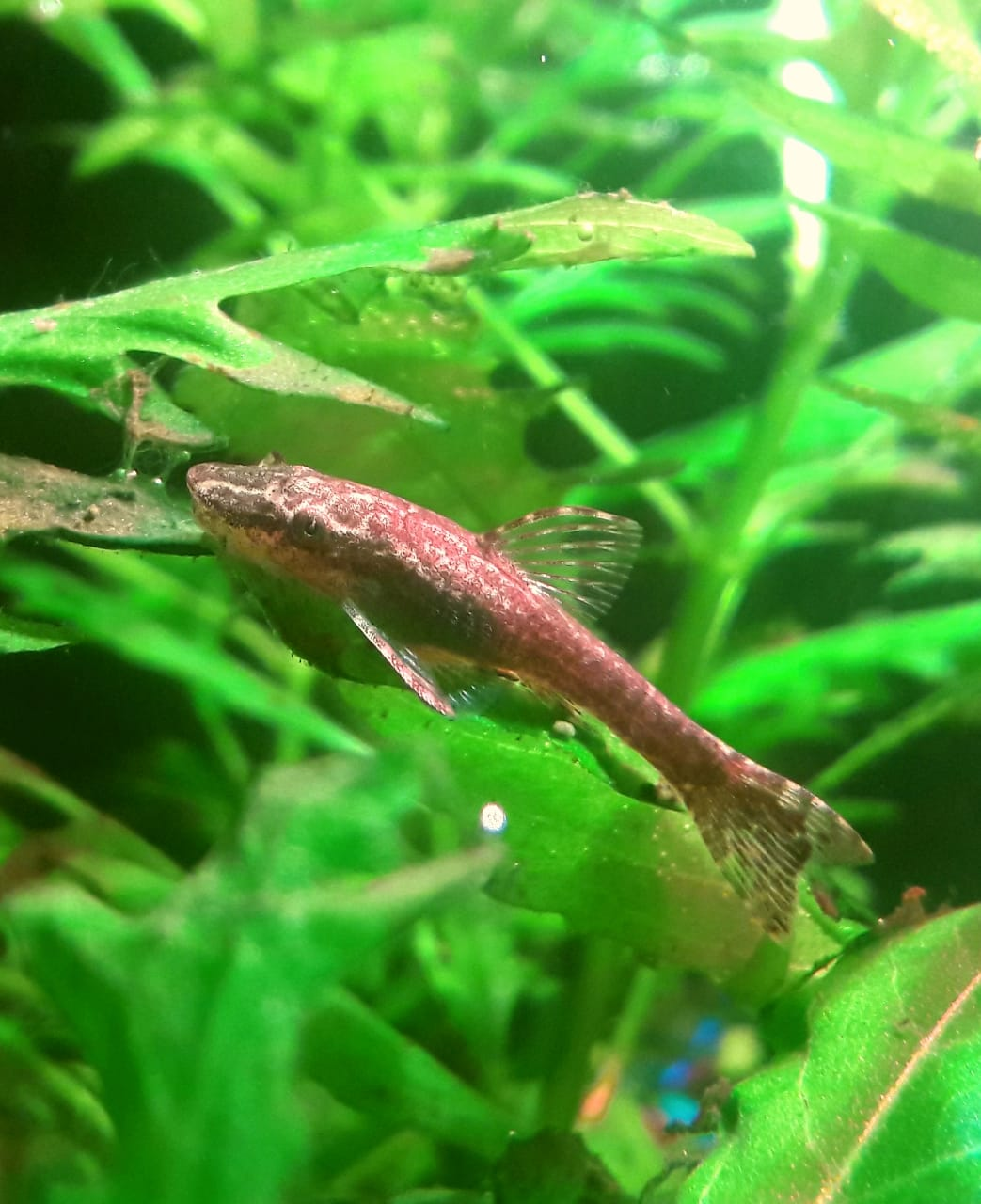

Conservation status
- Least Concern (IUCN 3.1)

Scientific classification
- Kingdom: Animalia
- Phylum: Chordata
- Class: Actinopterygii
- Order: Siluriformes
- Family: Loricariidae
- Genus: Otothyropsis
- Species: O. piribebuy

Binomial name
- Otothyropsis piribebuy Calegari, Lehmann A. & R. E. dos Reis, 2011

= Otothyropsis piribebuy =

Species of catfish

Otothyropsis piribebuy, the black oto, is a species of freshwater ray-finned fish belonging to the family Loricariidae, the suckermouth armored catfishes, and the subfamily Hypoptopomatinae, the cascudinhos. This catfish is found in South America, where it occurs in left bank tributaries of the Paraguay River in Matto Grosso, Brazil, and Paraguay. It is found in areas with marginal vegetation and reaches a standard length of 2.9 cm (1.1 in). This species is known to be collected for the aquarium trade, where it may be confused with fish of the genus Otocinclus, which are in the same family and are visually similar.
