= Plesioptopoma =

Conservation status
- Critically Endangered (IUCN 3.1)

Scientific classification
- Kingdom: Animalia
- Phylum: Chordata
- Class: Actinopterygii
- Order: Siluriformes
- Family: Loricariidae
- Subfamily: Hypoptopomatinae
- Genus: Plesioptopoma; Reis, E. H. L. Pereira & Lehmann A., 2012
- Species: P. curvidens

Binomial name
- Plesioptopoma curvidens Reis, E. H. L. Pereira & Lehmann A., 2012

Species of fish

Plesioptopoma is a monospecific genus of freshwater ray-finned fish belonging to the family Loricariidae, the suckermouth armored catfishes, and the subfamily Hypoptopomatinae, the cascudinos. The only species in this genus is Plesioptopoma curvidens, a species of catfish endemic to Brazil.

== Taxonomy ==
Plesioptopoma was first proposed as a monospecific genus in 2012 by the Brazilian ichthyologists Roberto Esser dos Reis, Edson Henrique Lopes Pereira and Pablo César Lehmann Albornoz when they described it’s only species Plesioptopoma curvidens. They gave the type locality as Cristiano Otoni, Paraopeba River, in the upper São Francisco River drainage, at an old bridge around 100 m (330 ft) west of highway BR-040 at 20°49'11"S, 43°48'47"W, in Minas Gerais. Eschmeyer's Catalog of Fishes classified the genus Plesioptopoma in the subfamily Hypoptopomatinae, the cascudinhos, within the suckermouth armored catfish family Loricariidae.

== Etymology ==
Plesioptopoma, the genus name, prefixes plesio-, indicating a basal characteristic, onto optopoma, from Hypoptopoma, the type genus of the subfamily Hypoptopomatinae, alluding to the apparently basal position this taxon holds within that subfamily. The specific name, curvidens, means "curved teeth", an allusion to the strongly curved teeth on both the dentary and the premaxilla.

== Description ==
Plesioptopoma has its dorsal fin supported by one spine and seven soft rays, while it’s anal fin is supported by six soft rays. This taxon differs from all other genera in the subfamily Hypoptopomatinae in having the coracoid with an exposed area on its ventral surface which supports a few odontodes laterally, near to the pectoral fin. Other distinctive characteristics include the odontodes on the lower surface of the unbranched ray in the pelvic fin are obviously bent and turned from their midpoint and in the series of strongly curved teeth on both the dentary and premaxilla. The caudal peduncle has a quadrangular cross section and the tip of the snout is naked with no plates. The body is elongated in shape and this species reaches a standard length of 9.2 cm (3.6 in).

== Distribution and habitat ==
Plesioptopoma is only known from its type locality, in the upper reaches of the Paraopeba River, a tributary of the upper São Francisco River, near Cristiano Otoni, Minas Gerais. The stream this catfish is found in is a small, around 2 to 4 m (6 ft 7 in to 13 ft 1 in) in width, with a depth of no greater than 0.5 m (1 ft 8 in). The water is clear but heavily polluted by organic sewage, has a large amount of marginal vegetation, both submerged and emergent, with a streambed largely comprising sand, with patches of gravel and pebbles.

== Conservation status ==
Plesioptopoma is monospecific, its only species is P. curvidens. This species is known only from a single location, its type locality, and is assessed by the International Union for Conservation of Nature as Critically Endangered.
