= Otothyropsis dialeukos =

Scientific classification
- Kingdom: Animalia
- Phylum: Chordata
- Class: Actinopterygii
- Order: Siluriformes
- Family: Loricariidae
- Genus: Otothyropsis
- Species: O. dialeukos

Binomial name
- Otothyropsis dialeukos Calegari, Morlis & Reis, 2017

Species of catfish

Otothyropsis dialeukos is a species of freshwater ray-finned fish belonging to the family Loricariidae, the suckermouth armored catfishes, and the subfamily Hypoptopomatinae, the cascudinhos. This catfish is known only from its type locality of Arroyo Ita, a tributary to the Embalse de Acaray in the upper Paraná River basin in Paraguay. This species reaches a standard length of 3.6 cm (1.4 in).
