= Nannoptopoma spectabile =

Conservation status
- Least Concern (IUCN 3.1)

Scientific classification
- Kingdom: Animalia
- Phylum: Chordata
- Class: Actinopterygii
- Division: Teleostei
- Order: Siluriformes
- Family: Loricariidae
- Genus: Nannoptopoma
- Species: N. spectabile

Binomial name
- Nannoptopoma spectabile (C. H. Eigenmann, 1914)

Synonyms
- Otocinclus spectabilis C. H. Eigenmann, 1914; Hypoptopoma spectabile (C. H. Eigenmann, 1914)

Species of fish

Nannoptopoma spectabile is a species of freshwater ray-finned fish belonging to the family Loricariidae, the suckermouth armored catfishes, and the subfamily Hypoptopomatinae. the cascudinhos. This catfish has a wide distribution in the western Andean tributaries of the Orinoco, in the Apure, Arauca and Meta Rivers, as well as the tributaries the Orinoco which flow from the Guiana Shield in Venezuela including the Upper Orinoco, Cuchivero and Caura rivers, in Colombia and Venezuela. This species reaches a maximum standard length of 3.9 cm (1.5 in).
