= Hypoptopoma guianense =

Conservation status
- Least Concern (IUCN 3.1)

Scientific classification
- Kingdom: Animalia
- Phylum: Chordata
- Class: Actinopterygii
- Order: Siluriformes
- Family: Loricariidae
- Genus: Hypoptopoma
- Species: H. guianense

Binomial name
- Hypoptopoma guianense Boeseman, 1974

Species of catfish

Hypoptopoma guianense is a species of freshwater ray-finned fish belonging to the family Loricariidae, the suckermouth armored catfishes, and the subfamily Hypoptopomatinae. the cascudinhos. This catfish has a wide distribution in the Essequibo River and Demerara-Berbice River system in Guyana, and Nickerie River in Suriname. H. guianense was first formally described in 1974 by the Dutch ichthyologist Marinus Boeseman with its type locality given as a left tributary of the Nickerie River, a few kilometres upstream from Stonedansi Falls in Suriname. This taxon may be a species complex and H. guianense sensu stricto may be restricted to the Nickerie River. This species specific name, guianense denotes the Guianas, this species occurring in Guyana and Suriname, formerly British Guiana and Dutch Guiana, respectively.
