= Acestridium martini =

Conservation status
- Least Concern (IUCN 3.1)

Scientific classification
- Kingdom: Animalia
- Phylum: Chordata
- Class: Actinopterygii
- Order: Siluriformes
- Family: Loricariidae
- Genus: Acestridium
- Species: A. martini

Binomial name
- Acestridium martini Retzer, Nico & Provenzano, 1999

Species of fish

Acestridium martini is a species freshwater ray-finned fishes belonging to the family Loricariidae, the mailed catfishes, and the subfamily Hypoptopomatinae, the cascudinhos. This catfish is found in the Rio Negro drainage system in Brazil and Colombia and the upper Orinoco basin in Colombia and Venezuela. This species reaches a standard length of 6.7 cm (2.6 in). The specific name honors the Venezuelan ichthyologist Felipe José Martín Salazar, in recognition of his contributions to Neotropical ichthyology.
