= Corumbataia lucianoi =

Conservation status
- Endangered (IUCN 3.1)

Scientific classification
- Kingdom: Animalia
- Phylum: Chordata
- Class: Actinopterygii
- Order: Siluriformes
- Family: Loricariidae
- Genus: Corumbataia
- Species: C. lucianoi

Binomial name
- Corumbataia lucianoi Silva & Roxo & Souza & de Oliveira, 2018

Species of fish

Corumbataia lucianoi is a species of freshwater ray-finned fish belonging to the family Loricariidae, the suckermouth armoured catfishes, and the subfamily Hypoptopomatinae, the cascudinhos. This catfish is endemic to Brazil, where it is found in the Upper Rio Paraná basin in Goiás. This species grows to a standard length of 2.4 cm (0.94 in).

The fish is named in honor of Luciano de Souza da Costa e Silva, Gabriel de Souza’s brother.
