= Acestridium dichromum =

Conservation status
- Least Concern (IUCN 3.1)

Scientific classification
- Kingdom: Animalia
- Phylum: Chordata
- Class: Actinopterygii
- Order: Siluriformes
- Family: Loricariidae
- Genus: Acestridium
- Species: A. dichromum

Binomial name
- Acestridium dichromum Retzer, Nico & Provenzano, 1999

Species of fish

Acestridium dichromum is a species freshwater ray-finned fishes belonging to the family Loricariidae, the mailed catfishes, and the subfamily Hypoptopomatinae, the cascudinhos. This catfish occurs in tributaries of the upper Orinoco in Colombia and Venezuela, as well as in the upper Rio Negro drainage in Venezuela. There are records from Brazil but these are treated as unconfirmed. This species recahes a standard length of 6.3 cm (2.5 in).
