= Pseudotocinclus tietensis =

Conservation status
- Endangered (IUCN 3.1)

Scientific classification
- Kingdom: Animalia
- Phylum: Chordata
- Class: Actinopterygii
- Order: Siluriformes
- Family: Loricariidae
- Genus: Pseudotocinclus
- Species: P. tietensis

Binomial name
- Pseudotocinclus tietensis (Ihering (pt), 1907)

Synonyms
- Otocinclus tietensis Ihering, 1907; Pseudotocinclus intermedius Nichols, 1919

Species of fish

Pseudotocinclus tietensis is a species of freshwater ray-finned fish belonging to the family Loricariidae, the suckermouth armoured catfishes, and the subfamily Hypoptopomatinae, the cascudinhos. This catfish is endemic to Brazil.

== Taxonomy ==
Pseudotocinclus tietensis was first formally described as Otocinclus tietensis in 1907 by the Brazilian zoologist Rodolpho von Ihering with its type locality given as the Tietê River in the Brazilian state of São Paulo. In 1919 the American ichthyologist and ornithologist John Treadwell Nichols described a new species named Pseudotocinclus intermedius, with its type locality given as Campo Grande in Mato Grosso, for which he proposed the new monospecific genus Pseudotocinclus. In 1984 Heraldo A. Britski and Julio C. Garavello confirmed that Nichols' P. intermedius was a synonym of von Ihering's O. tietensis, which became the type species of Pseudotocinclus by monotypy. Eschmeyer's Catalog of Fishes classified the genus Pseudotocinclus in the subfamily Hypoptopomatinae, the cascudinhos, within the suckermouth armored catfish family Loricariidae.

== Etymology ==
Pseudotocinclus tietensis is the type species of the genus Pseudotocinclus, this name prefixes pseudo-, meaning “false”, onto Otocinclus, as these fishes appear to bear some resemblance to that genus but that resemblance is misleading. The specific name, tietensis, suffixes -ensis, meaning "of a place", onto Tiete, i.e. the Tietê River, the type locality.

== Description ==
Pseudotocinclus tietensis has a small naked area at the tip of the snout, a feature that distinguishes from P. juquiae and P. parahybae which have their snouts wholly covered in small platelets. This species reaches a standard length of 5 cm (2.0 in).

== Distribution and habitat ==
Pseudotocinclus tietensis is endemic to Brazil where its distribution is confined to the upper headwaters of the Tietê River basin and some coastal river basins draining from the São Paulo plateau region. This species is found in areas with fast currentswhere it clings onto submerged marginal vegetation, the riverbed, while hiding under rocks and pieces of wood.

== Conservation status ==
Pseudotocinclus tietensis is a scarce species and its population can be considered severely fragmented, through habitat degradation caused by increasing urbanisation and by the damming of watercourses in the Tietê River basin. For these reasons, the International Union for Conservation of Nature has categorised this species as Endangered.
