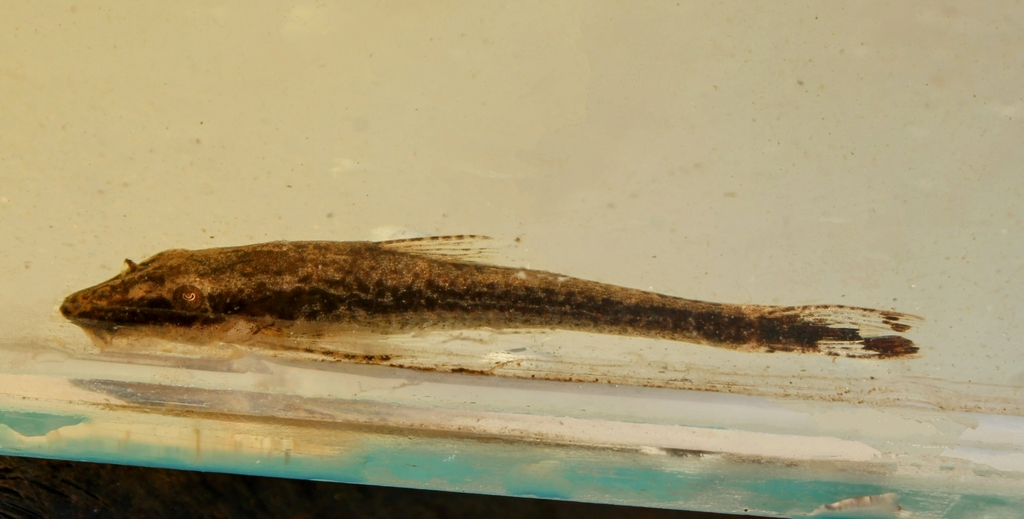

Conservation status
- Least Concern (IUCN 3.1)

Scientific classification
- Kingdom: Animalia
- Phylum: Chordata
- Class: Actinopterygii
- Order: Siluriformes
- Family: Loricariidae
- Genus: Otothyropsis
- Species: O. polyodon

Binomial name
- Otothyropsis polyodon Calegari, Lehmann A. & Reis, 2013

= Otothyropsis polyodon =

Species of fish

Otothyropsis polyodon is a species of freshwater ray-finned fish belonging to the family Loricariidae, the suckermouth armored catfishes, and the subfamily Hypoptopomatinae, the cascudinhos. This catfish is endemic to Brazil where it is found in the tributaries of the Rio Verde in the state of Mato Grosso do Sul. This species reaches a standard length of 3.7 cm (1.5 in).

== Etymology ==
Otothyropsis polyodon has the specific name polyodon, this means "many teeth" and is a reference to the greater number of teeth in this species than in related species.
