= Curculionichthys coxipone =

Scientific classification
- Kingdom: Animalia
- Phylum: Chordata
- Class: Actinopterygii
- Order: Siluriformes
- Family: Loricariidae
- Genus: Curculionichthys
- Species: C. coxipone

Binomial name
- Curculionichthys coxipone Roxo, Silva, L. E. Ochoa & de Oliveira, 2015

Species of fish

Curculionichthys coxipone is a species of freshwater ray-finned fish belonging to the family Loricariidae, the suckermouth armoured catfishes, and the subfamily Hypoptopomatinae, the cascudinhos. This catfish occurs in the drainage basins of the Cuiabá River and the Paraguay River in Brazil. It reaches a standard length of 3 cm (1.2 in). The species was described in 2015 by Fábio Fernandes Roxo, Gabriel Souza da Costa e Silva, Luz E. Orrego, and Claudio Oliveira, alongside the description of the genus Curculionichthys to include several species formerly classified in the genus Hisonotus.
