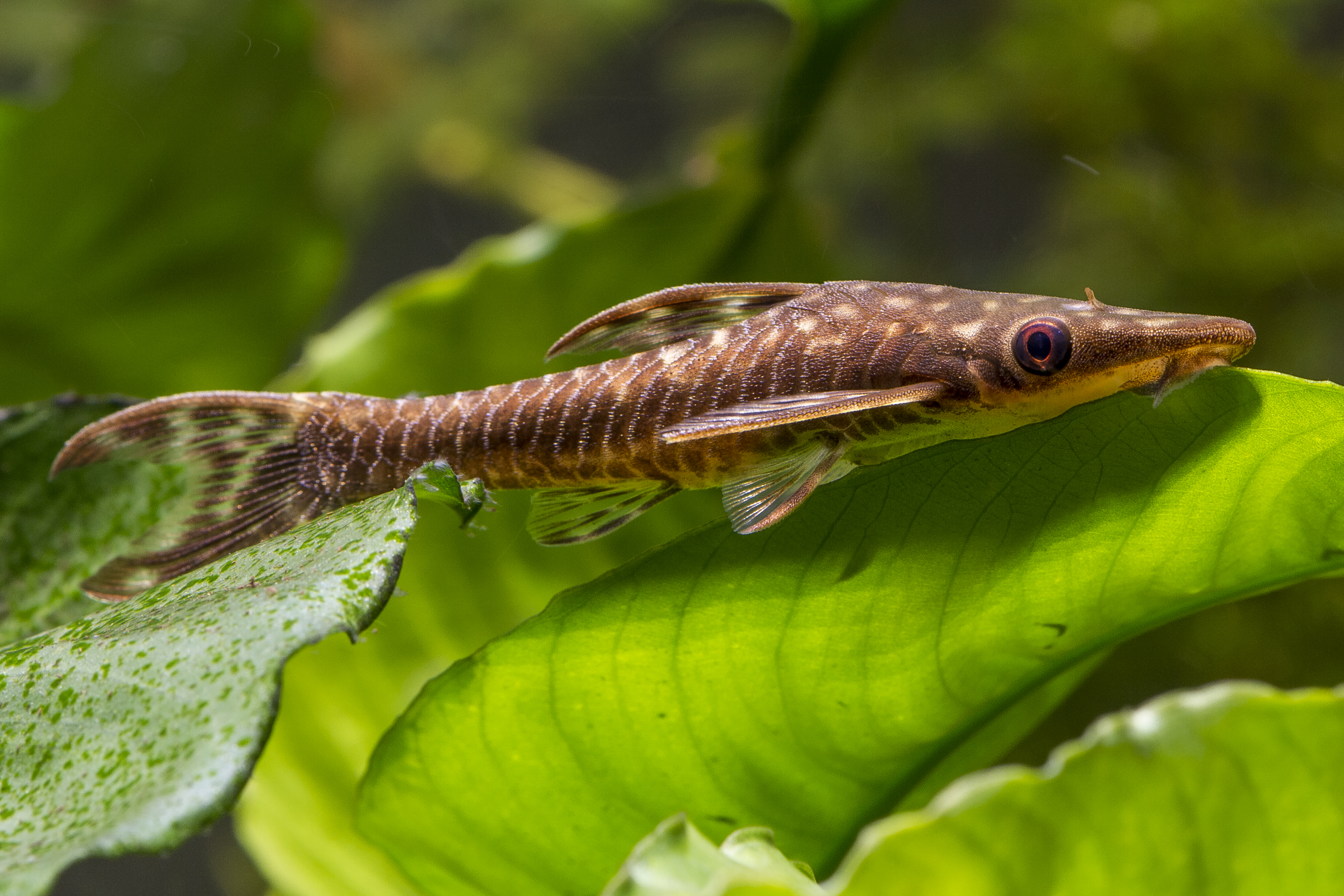

Conservation status
- Least Concern (IUCN 3.1)

Scientific classification
- Kingdom: Animalia
- Phylum: Chordata
- Class: Actinopterygii
- Order: Siluriformes
- Family: Loricariidae
- Genus: Hypoptopoma
- Species: H. inexspectatum

Binomial name
- Hypoptopoma inexspectatum (Holmberg, 1893)

Synonyms
- Aristommata inexspectata Holmberg, 1893; Hypoptopoma guentheri Boulenger, 1895

= Hypoptopoma inexspectatum =

Species of catfish

Hypoptopoma inexspectatum is a species of freshwater ray-finned fish belonging to the family Loricariidae, the suckermouth armored catfishes, and the subfamily Hypoptopomatinae. the cascudinhos. This catfish is found in the Paraguay and middle and lower Paraná River basins, in Argentina, Brazil Bolivia and Paraguay. This species reaches a standard length of 7.1 cm (2.8 in).
