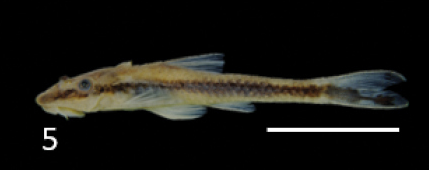
- Curculionichthys insperatus scalebar = 1cm

Conservation status
- Least Concern (IUCN 3.1)

Scientific classification
- Kingdom: Animalia
- Phylum: Chordata
- Class: Actinopterygii
- Order: Siluriformes
- Family: Loricariidae
- Genus: Curculionichthys
- Species: C. insperatus

Binomial name
- Curculionichthys insperatus (Britski & Garavello, 2003)

Synonyms
- Hisonotus insperatus Britski & Garavello, 2003

= Curculionichthys insperatus =

Species of fish

Curculionichthys insperatus is a species of freshwater ray-finned fish belonging to the family Loricariidae, the suckermouth armoured catfishes, and the subfamily Hypoptopomatinae, the cascudinhos. This catfish occurs in the Paraná River drainage in the Brazilian Federal District, Goiás, Mato Grosso do Sul, Minas Gerais, Paraná and São Paulo. This specie is found in streams near banks covered with partially submerged vegetation. It reaches 3 cm (1.2 inches) standard length. C. insperatus was first formally described in 2003 as Hisonotus insperatus by Heraldo A. Britski and Julio C. Garavello with its type locality given as Rio Capivara in the Rio Tietê drainage at Botucatu in São Paulo State. In 2015 Fábio Fernandes Roxo, Gabriel de Souza da Costa e Silva, Luz E. Orrego, and Claudio de Oliveira proposed the new genus Curculionichthys for some species previously placed in the genus Hisonotus, with H.insperatus designated as its type species.
