= Nannoxyropsis =

Scientific classification
- Kingdom: Animalia
- Phylum: Chordata
- Class: Actinopterygii
- Order: Siluriformes
- Family: Loricariidae
- Subfamily: Hypoptopomatinae
- Genus: Nannoxyropsis; Delapieve, Lehmann A. & Reis, 2018

Type species
- Nannoxyropsis acicula Delapieve, Lehmann A & Reis, 2018

Genus of ray-finned fish

Nannoxyropsis is a genus of freshwater ray-finned fish belonging to the family Loricariidae, the suckermouth armoured catfishes, and the subfamily Hypoptopomatinae, the cascudinhos. The catfishes in this genus are found in South America.

== Species ==
Nannoxyropsis contains the following species:

- Nannoxyropsis acicula Delapieve, Lehmann A. & Reis, 2018
- Nannoxyropsis ephippia (Aquino & Sabaj Pérez, 2016)
