= Chauliocheilos =

Scientific classification
- Kingdom: Animalia
- Phylum: Chordata
- Class: Actinopterygii
- Order: Siluriformes
- Family: Loricariidae
- Subfamily: Hypoptopomatinae
- Genus: Chauliocheilos; Martins, B. N. Andrade, A. C. Rosa & Langeani, 2014
- Species: C. saxatilis

Binomial name
- Chauliocheilos saxatilis Martins, B. N. Andrade, A. C. Rosa & Langeani, 2014

Species of fish

Chauliocheilos is a monospecific genus of freshwater ray-finned fish belonging to the family Loricariidae, the suckermouth armored catfishes, and the subfamily Hypoptopomatinae, the cascudinos. The only species in this genus is Chauliocheilos saxatilis. This species occurs Rio Itamarandiba in upper Rio Jequitinhonha basin, southeastern Brazil.
