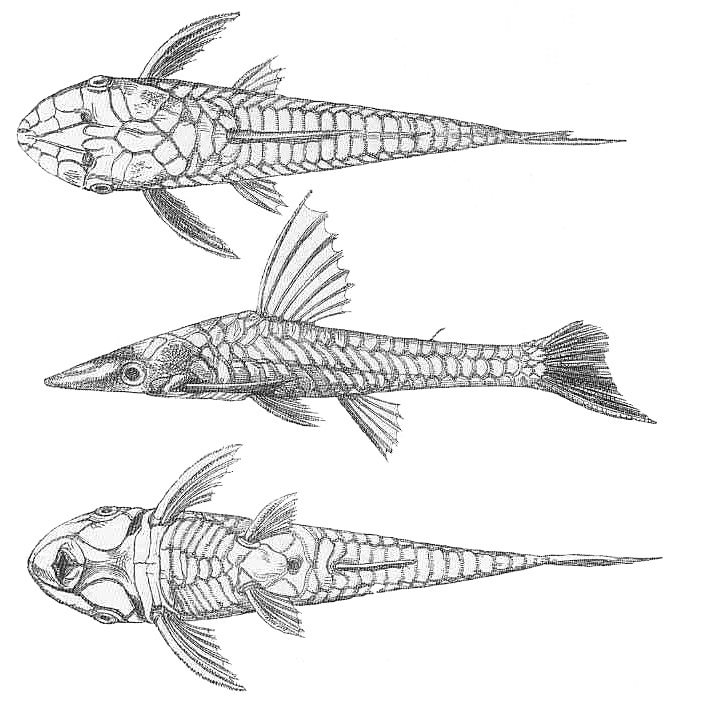

Conservation status
- Least Concern (IUCN 3.1)

Scientific classification
- Kingdom: Animalia
- Phylum: Chordata
- Class: Actinopterygii
- Division: Teleostei
- Order: Siluriformes
- Family: Loricariidae
- Genus: Hypoptopoma
- Species: H. thoracatum

Binomial name
- Hypoptopoma thoracatum Günther, 1868

Synonyms
- Hypoptopoma bilobatum Cope, 1870

= Hypoptopoma thoracatum =

Species of fish

Hypoptopoma thoracatum is a species of freshwater ray-finned fish belonging to the family Loricariidae, the suckermouth armored catfishes, and the subfamily Hypoptopomatinae, the cascudinhos. This catfish occurs in the Amazon River basin in Bolivia, Brazil, Colombia, Ecuador and Peru. It may also occur in the Orinoco basin in Venezuela and southwestern Guyana but its occurrence in this system requires confirmation. H. thoracatum reaches a total length of 11.5 cm (4.5 in). This species was first formally described in 1868 by the German-born British ichthyologist and herpetologist Albert Günther with its type locality given as as Xeberos in the upper Amazon of Peru. When Günther described this species, he proposed the new monospecific genus Hypoptopoma, meaning that H. thoracatum serves as the type species of that genus by monotypy.
