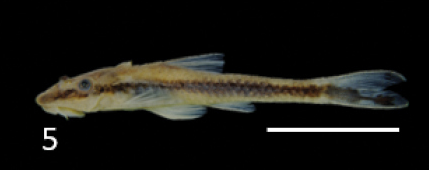
- Curculionichthys insperatus

Scientific classification
- Kingdom: Animalia
- Phylum: Chordata
- Class: Actinopterygii
- Order: Siluriformes
- Family: Loricariidae
- Subfamily: Hypoptopomatinae
- Genus: Curculionichthys; Roxo, G. S. C. Silva, L. E. Ochoa & C. de Oliveira, 2015

Type species
- Hisonotus insperatus Britski & Garavello, 2003

= Curculionichthys =

Genus of fishes

Curculionichthys is a genus of freshwater ray-finned fishes belonging to the family Loricariidae, the mailed catfishes, and the subfamily Hypoptopomatinae, the cascudinhos. The catfishes in this genus are found in South America.

== Species ==
Curculionichthys contains the following species:

- Curculionichthys coxipone Roxo, G. S. C. Silva, L. E. Ochoa & C. de Oliveira, 2015
- Curculionichthys insperatus (Britski & Garavello, 2003)
- Curculionichthys itaim Roxo, Dias, G. S. C. Silva & C. de Oliveira, 2017
- Curculionichthys karipuna G. S. C. Silva, Roxo, Melo & C. de Oliveira, 2016
- Curculionichthys luteofrenatus (Britski & Garavello, 2007)
- Curculionichthys monolechis Morais, Gamarra & Reis, 2024
- Curculionichthys oliveirai (Roxo, Zawadzki & Troy, 2014)
- Curculionichthys paresi (Roxo, Zawadzki & Troy, 2014)
- Curculionichthys piracanjuba (Martins & Langeani, 2012)
- Curculionichthys sabaji Roxo, G. S. C. Silva, L. E. Ochoa & C. de Oliveira, 2015
- Curculionichthys sagarana Roxo, G. S. C. Silva, L. E. Ochoa & C. de Oliveira, 2015
- Curculionichthys scaius Calegari, Gamarra & Reis, 2018
- Curculionichthys tukana Roxo, Dias, G. S. C. Silva & C. de Oliveira, 2017
