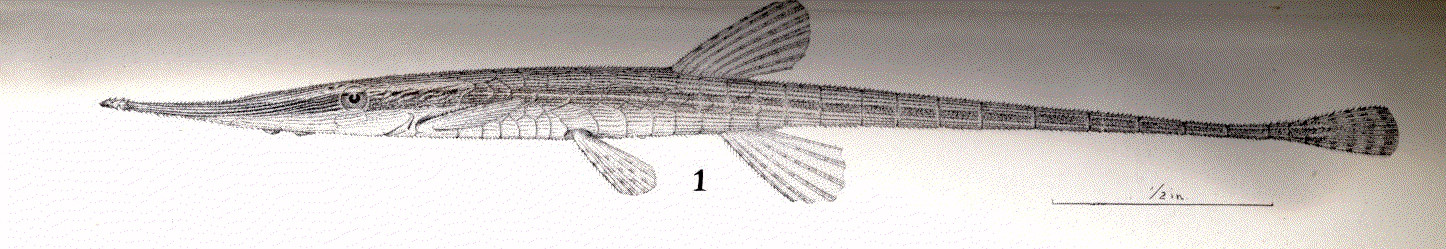

Conservation status
- Least Concern (IUCN 3.1)

Scientific classification
- Kingdom: Animalia
- Phylum: Chordata
- Class: Actinopterygii
- Order: Siluriformes
- Family: Loricariidae
- Genus: Acestridium
- Species: A. discus

Binomial name
- Acestridium discus Haseman, 1911

= Acestridium discus =

Species of fish

Acestridium discus is a species of freshwater ray-finned fish belonging to the family Loricariidae, the suckermouth armored catfishes, and the subfamily Hypoptopomatinae, the cascudinos. This catfish is endemic to Brazil where it occurs in the basin of the Rio Negro in the state of Amazonas. A. discus was first formally described in 1911 by the American ichthyologist John Diederich Haseman with its type locality given as Igarapé de Cachoeira Grande, near Manaus. When Haseman described this species he classified it in the new monospecific genus Acestridium , meaning that A. discus is the type species of that genus by monotypy. This species reaches a standard length of 6.7 cm (2.6 in).
