= Niobichthys =

Conservation status
- Least Concern (IUCN 3.1)

Scientific classification
- Kingdom: Animalia
- Phylum: Chordata
- Class: Actinopterygii
- Order: Siluriformes
- Family: Loricariidae
- Subfamily: Hypoptopomatinae
- Genus: Niobichthys; Schaefer & Provenzano, 1998
- Species: N. ferrarisi

Binomial name
- Niobichthys ferrarisi Schaefer & Provenzano, 1998

Species of fish

Niobichthys is a monospecific genus of freshwater ray-finned fish belonging to the family Loricariidae, the suckermouth armored catfishes, and the subfamily Hypoptopomatinae, the cascudinhos. The only species in the genus is Niobichthys ferrarisi, a catfish which is endemic to Venezuela. It is only known to occur in the Baria River, a tributary of the Rio Negro in Amazonas state, where it is found in rocky rapids. This species reaches a standard length of 7 cm (2.8 in).

Niobichthys suffixes -ichthys, Greek for "fish", onto Niobe, a figure from Greek mythology whose children were killed by Apollo causing her to turned to stone by Zeus and moved to a mountain peak, which remained eternally wet with her tears. This is a reference to the clouds surrounding Cerra La Neblina, this species' type locality. The Specific named honors the American ichthyologist Carl J. Ferraris Jr., co-discoverer of this species when on an expedition to the Cerr La Neblina in 1984, in recognition of his work on catfish taxonomy and Neotropical ichthyology.
