= Leptotocinclus =

Scientific classification
- Kingdom: Animalia
- Phylum: Chordata
- Class: Actinopterygii
- Order: Siluriformes
- Family: Loricariidae
- Subfamily: Hypoptopomatinae
- Genus: Leptotocinclus; Delapieve, Lehmann A & Reis, 2018

Type species
- Leptotocinclus madeirae Delapieve, Lehmann A & Reis, 2018

Genus of ray-finned fishes

Leptotocinclus is a genus of freshwater ray-finned fish belonging to the family Loricariidae, the suckermouth armoured catfishes, and the subfamily Hypoptopomatinae, the cascudinhos. The catfishes in this genus are found in South America.

== Taxonomy ==
Leptotocinclus was first proposed as a genus in 2018 by Maria Laura S. Delapieve, Pablo César Lehmann Albornoz and Roberto Esser dos Reis when they described both species in the genus, designating L. madeirae as its type species. This genus is classified in the subfamily Hypoptopomatinae, the casudinhos, of the armored suckermouth catfish family, Loricariinae, within the suborder Loricarioidei of the catfish order Siluriformes.

== Species ==
Leptotocinclus contains the following valid species:

- Leptotocinclus ctenistus Delapieve, Lehmann A. & Reis, 2018
- Leptotocinclus madeirae Delapieve, Lehmann A. & Reis, 2018
