= Corumbataia =

Scientific classification
- Kingdom: Animalia
- Phylum: Chordata
- Class: Actinopterygii
- Order: Siluriformes
- Family: Loricariidae
- Subfamily: Hypoptopomatinae
- Genus: Corumbataia; Britski, 1997

Type species
- Corumbataia cuestae Britski, 1997

Synonyms
- Gymnotocinclus Carvalho, Lehmann, A. & Reis, 2008

Genus of fishes

Corumbataia is a genus of freshwater ray-finned fishes belonging to the family Loricariidae, the mailed catfishes, and the subfamily Hypoptopomatinae, the cascudinhos. The catfishes in this genus are found in South America, where they are only known from Brazil.

== Species ==
Corumbataia contains the following valid species:

- Corumbataia acanthodela Thimotheo, Benine, Oliveira & Silva, 2020
- Corumbataia anosteos (Carvalho, Lehmann A. & Reis, 2008)
- Corumbataia britskii Ferreira & Ribeiro, 2007
- Corumbataia canoeiro (Roxo, Silva, Ochoa & Zawadzki, 2017)
- Corumbataia cuestae Britski, 1997
- Corumbataia liliai Silva, Roxo, Souza & Oliveira, 2018
- Corumbataia lucianoi Silva, Roxo, Souza & Oliveira, 2018
- Corumbataia tocantinensis Britski, 1997
- Corumbataia veadeiros Carvalho, 2008

== Description ==
These species range in size from about 2.7–3.8 centimetres (1.1–1.5 in) SL.

C. cuestae and C. tocantinensis were described to be differentiated by counts of premaxillary and dentary teeth. However, they also differ in color pattern, as the unbranched caudal fin rays of C. britskii and C. tocantinensis lack the striped pattern present in C. cuestae.

Corumbataia species exhibit sexual dimorphism. Males differ from females by presenting a developed urogenital papillae posterior to the anus, a skin fold at the dorsal portion of the pelvic fin spine, and a much longer pelvic fin spine that extends over the first anal fin ray. In C. britskii, males also differ from females by having four white blotches on the caudal fin, two at the dorsal lobe and two at the ventral lobe. Females, on the other hand, present only two white blotches, one on each lobe.
