= Euryochus =

Scientific classification
- Kingdom: Animalia
- Phylum: Chordata
- Class: Actinopterygii
- Order: Siluriformes
- Family: Loricariidae
- Subfamily: Hypoptopomatinae
- Genus: Euryochus; Pereira & Reis, 2017
- Species: E. thysanos

Binomial name
- Euryochus thysanos Pereira & Reis, 2017

Genus of fishes

Euryochus is a monospecific genus of freshwater ray-finned fish belonging to the family Loricariidae, the suckermouth armoured catfishes, and the subfamily Hypoptopomatinae, the cascudinhos. The only species in the genus is Euryochus thysanos. A catfish which is endemic to eastern Brazil where it is found from the Itapemirim River, across the larger Mucuri River and Doce River Basins to the Frades River in Bahia state. This species grows to a length of 12.0 centimetres (4.7 in) TL.

The generic name Euryochus is from the Greek for "large eye", and the specific name θύσανος "thýsanos", meaning tassel or fringe, refers to the finely fringed margin of lower lip.
