= Acestridium colombiense =

Conservation status
- Least Concern (IUCN 3.1)

Scientific classification
- Kingdom: Animalia
- Phylum: Chordata
- Class: Actinopterygii
- Order: Siluriformes
- Family: Loricariidae
- Genus: Acestridium
- Species: A. colombiense

Binomial name
- Acestridium colombiense Retzer, 2005

Species of fish

Acestridium colombiense is a species of freshwater ray-finned fish belonging to the family Loricariidae, the suckermouth armored catfishes, and the subfamily Hypoptopomatinae, the cascudinos. This catfish is endemic to Colombia, where it is found in the Bita, Tomo and Inírida Rivers, in the Vichada and Guainía departments of eastern Colombia.

Like all Acestridium species, this is a very slender and elongated fish. Specimens of up to 4.9 centimetres (1.9 in) SL have been recorded. It can most readily be distinguished from its congeners by its rather homogeneous brown coloration (as opposed to having striped markings) and the very low number of jaw teeth.
