= Hirtella carinata =

Scientific classification
- Kingdom: Animalia
- Phylum: Chordata
- Class: Actinopterygii
- Order: Siluriformes
- Family: Loricariidae
- Subfamily: Hypoptopomatinae
- Genus: Hirtella; E. H. L. Pereira, Zanata, Cetra & R. E. dos Reis, 2014
- Species: H. carinata

Binomial name
- Hirtella carinata E. H. L. Pereira, Zanata, Cetra & R. E. dos Reis, 2014

Species of fish

Hirtella is a monospecific genus of freshwater ray-finned fish belonging to the family Loricariidae, the suckermouth armoured catfishes, and the subfamily Hypoptopomatinae, the cascudinhos. The only species in the genus is Hirtella carinata, the hairy hillstream pleco. This catfish is endemic to Brazil where it occurs in the Rio Panelão, Rio Pardo and Rio Panelinha basins in Brazil. The species reaches a standard length of 4.9 cm (1.9 in).
