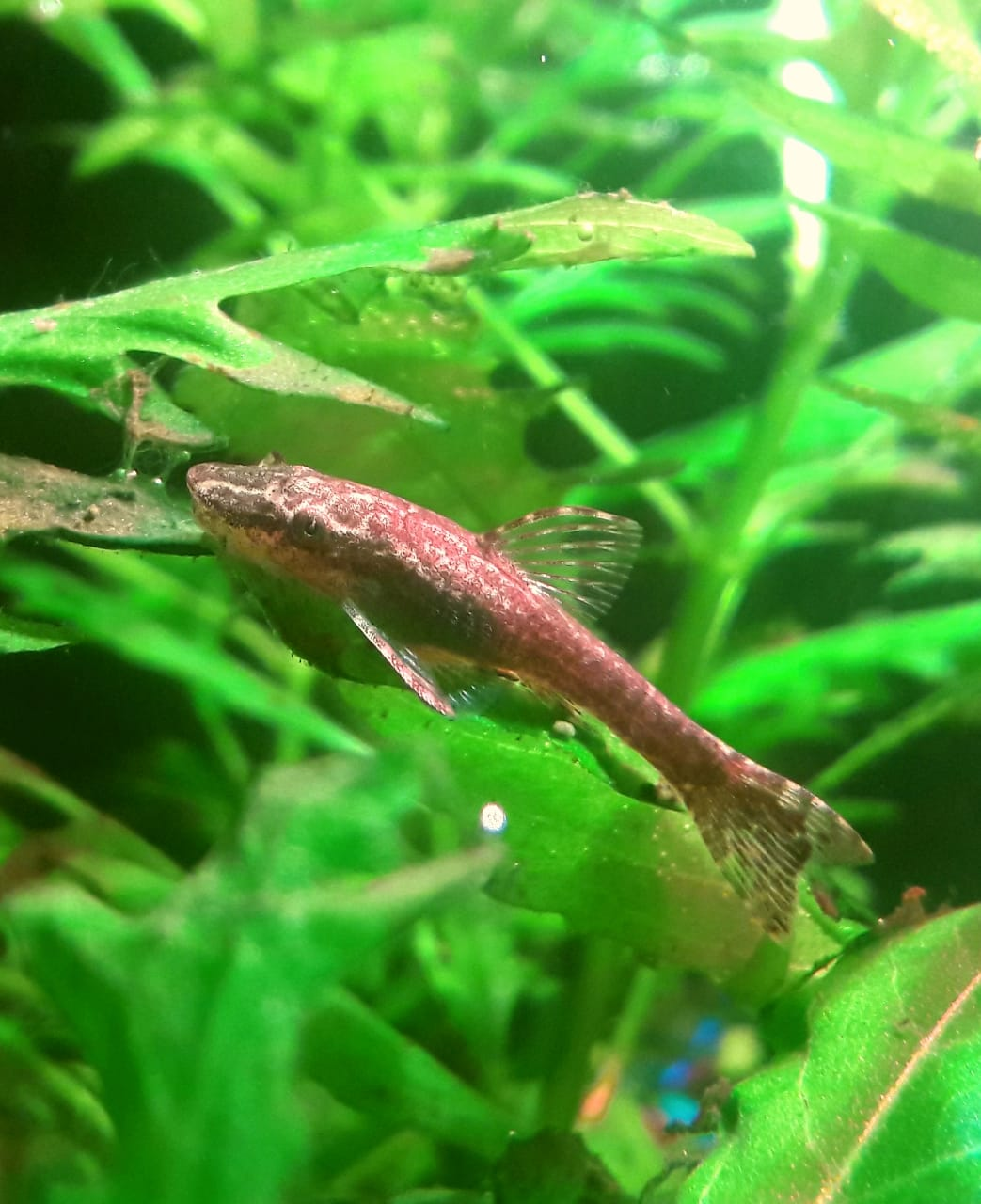
- Otothyropsis piribebuy

Scientific classification
- Kingdom: Animalia
- Phylum: Chordata
- Class: Actinopterygii
- Order: Siluriformes
- Family: Loricariidae
- Subfamily: Hypoptopomatinae
- Genus: Otothyropsis; Ribeiro, Carvalho & Melo, 2005

Type species
- Otothyropsis marapoama Ribeiro, Carvalho & Melo, 2005

= Otothyropsis =

Genus of fishes

Otothyropsis is a genus of freshwater ray-finned fishes belonging to the family Loricariidae, the suckermouth armored catfishes, and the subfamily Hypoptopomatinae, the cascudinhos. The catfishes in this genus are found in South America

== Species ==
There are currently 6 recognized species in this genus:

- Otothyropsis alicula Lippert, Calegari & Reis, 2014
- Otothyropsis biamnicus Calegari, Lehmann A. & Reis, 2013
- Otothyropsis dialeukos Calegari, Morlis & Reis, 2017
- Otothyropsis marapoama Ribeiro, Carvalho & Melo, 2005
- Otothyropsis piribebuy Calegari, Lehmann A. & Reis, 2011
- Otothyropsis polyodon Calegari, Lehmann A. & Reis, 2013
