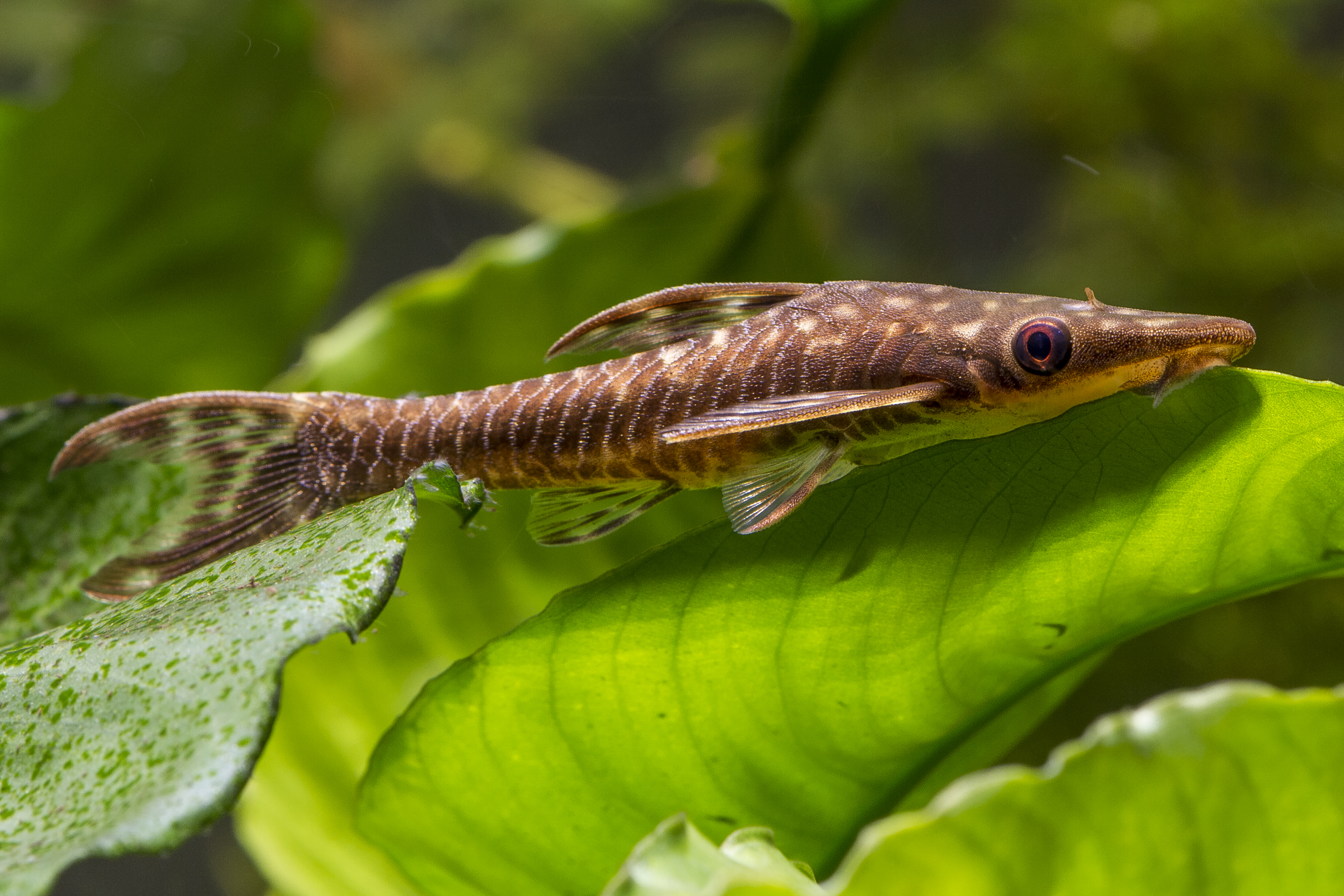
- Hypoptopoma inexspectatum

Scientific classification
- Kingdom: Animalia
- Phylum: Chordata
- Class: Actinopterygii
- Order: Siluriformes
- Family: Loricariidae
- Subfamily: Hypoptopomatinae
- Genus: Hypoptopoma; Günther, 1868

Type species
- Hypoptopoma thoracatum Günther 1868

Synonyms
- Aristommata Holmberg, 1893; Diapeltoplites Fowler, 1915; Nannoptopoma Schaefer, 1996

= Hypoptopoma =

Genus of fishes

Hypoptopoma is a genus of freshwater ray-finned fishes belonging to the family Loricariidae, the mailed catfishes, and the subfamily Hypoptopomatinae, the cascudinhos. The catfishes in this genus are found in South America.

== Taxonomy ==
Hypoptopoma was first proposed as a monospecific genus in 1868 by the German-born British ichthyologist and herpetologist Albert Günther when he described Hypoptopoma thoracatum. Günther gave H. thoracatum's type locality as Xeberos in the upper Amazon of Peru. This genus is the type genus of the subfamily Hypoptopomatinae, which is classified in family Loricariidae in the Neotropical catfish suborder Loricarioidei.

== Species ==
Hypoptopoma contains the following valid species:

- Hypoptopoma baileyi Aquino & Schaefer, 2010
- Hypoptopoma bianale Aquino & Schaefer, 2010
- Hypoptopoma brevirostratum Aquino & Schaefer, 2010
- Hypoptopoma elongatum Aquino & Schaefer, 2010
- Hypoptopoma guianense Boeseman, 1974
- Hypoptopoma gulare Cope, 1878
- Hypoptopoma incognitum Aquino & Schaefer, 2010
- Hypoptopoma inexspectatum (Holmberg, 1893)
- Hypoptopoma machadoi Aquino & Schaefer, 2010
- Hypoptopoma muzuspi Aquino & Schaefer, 2010
- Hypoptopoma psilogaster Fowler, 1915
- Hypoptopoma steindachneri Boulenger, 1895
- Hypoptopoma thoracatum Günther, 1868

== Distribution ==
Hypoptopoma species inhabit the drainage basins to the east of the Andes, except for river systems draining to the Atlantic between the mouth of the Amazon River in Brazil and the Paraná River in Argentina.
