= Pseudotocinclus =

Scientific classification
- Kingdom: Animalia
- Phylum: Chordata
- Class: Actinopterygii
- Order: Siluriformes
- Family: Loricariidae
- Tribe: Otothyrini
- Genus: Pseudotocinclus; Nichols, 1919

Type species
- Pseudotocinclus intermedius Nichols, 1919

Genus of fishes

Pseudotocinclus is a genus of armored catfishes native to South America.

== Species ==
There are currently three recognized species in this genus:

- Pseudotocinclus juquiae Takako, Oliveira & Oyakawa, 2005
- Pseudotocinclus parahybae Takako, Oliveira & Oyakawa, 2005
- Pseudotocinclus tietensis (Ihering (pt), 1907)

== Distribution and habitat ==
Species of Pseudotocinclus are found in the upper Tietê River basin in the ribeirão Grande, a tributary of the middle course of the rio Paraíba do Sul, Pindamonhangaba, in the headwaters of rio Itatinga, a coastal river of São Paulo, and in the upper and lower courses of the Juquiá River of the Ribeira de Iguape River basin, all rivers of São Paulo, Brazil. Like other members of the subfamily Hypoptopomatinae, Pseudotocinclus is primarily herbivorous and is more commonly found at or near the upper portion of the water column. It lives in close association with sub-surface structures provided by submerged tree branches, aquatic macrophytes, and terrestrial grass blades growing along creek margins and extending into the water.

== Description ==
The genus Pseudotocinclus can be distinguished from other genera of the subfamily Hypoptopomatinae by the presence of a caudal peduncle that is nearly square in cross section from the posterior base of the dorsal fin to the caudal fin, as well as having 26 or more plates along the lateral line, a dorsally positioned eye, an exposed preopercle, and an abdomen covered with numerous small platelets.

The presence of a small naked area on the snout tip distinguishes P. tietensis from P. parahybae and P. juquiae, which have the snout tip covered with small platelets. In addition, P. tietensis has four transverse dark-brown bands on the dorsum coalesced with the midlateral stripe instead of three as in the other two species. P. juquiae is distinguished from the other species by having a very prominent and conspicuous ring structure around the eye. The three species also differ from their congeners by meristics and morphometrics.
