= Maquiné River =

Location
- Country: Brazil

Physical characteristics
- Source
  - location: Rio Grande do Sul state
- Mouth: Atlantic Ocean
  - coordinates: 29°44′S 50°8′W

The Maquiné River is a river of Rio Grande do Sul state in southern Brazil.

== See also ==
- List of rivers of Rio Grande do Sul
