= Três Forquilhas River =

Coordinates: 29°31′44″S 49°58′51″W

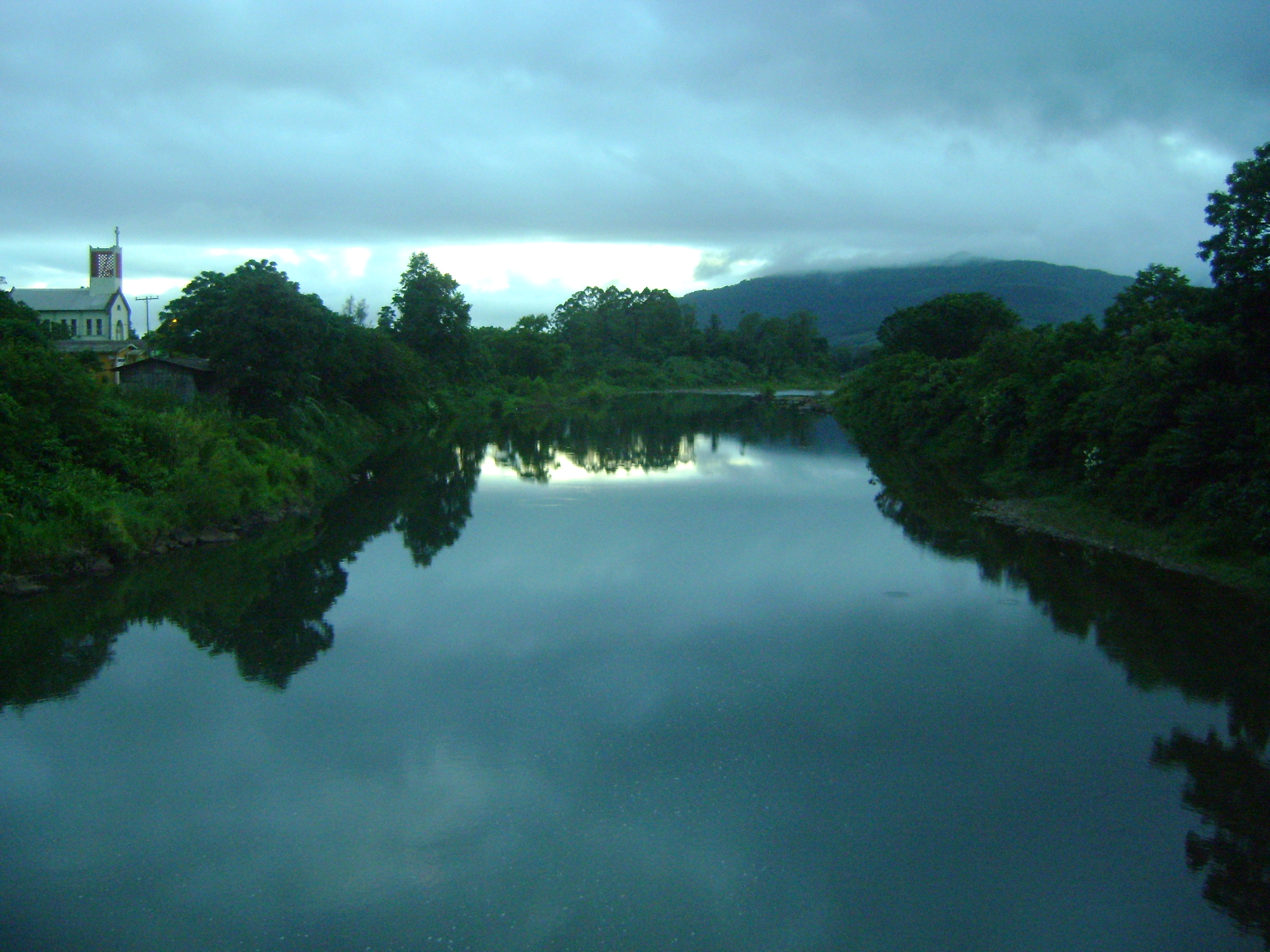

Location
- Country: Brazil

Physical characteristics
- Source
  - location: Rio Grande do Sul state

The Três Forquilhas River is a river of Rio Grande do Sul state in southern Brazil.

== See also ==
- List of rivers of Rio Grande do Sul
