= Schizolecis =

Conservation status
- Least Concern (IUCN 3.1)

Scientific classification
- Kingdom: Animalia
- Phylum: Chordata
- Class: Actinopterygii
- Order: Siluriformes
- Family: Loricariidae
- Subfamily: Hypoptopomatinae
- Genus: Schizolecis; Britski & Garavello, 1984
- Species: S. guntheri

Binomial name
- Schizolecis guntheri (A. Miranda-Ribeiro, 1918)

Synonyms
- Microlepidogaster guntheri A. Miranda-Ribeiro, 1918

Monotypic genus of fish

Schizolecis is a monospecific genus freshwater ray-finned fish belonging to the family Loricariidae, the suckermouth armoured catfishes, and the subfamily Hypoptopomatinae, the cascudinhos. The only species in the genus is Schizolecis guntheri, a species which is endemic to Brazil.

== Taxonomy ==
Schizolecis was first proposed as a genus in 1984 by the Brazilian ichthyologists Heraldo A. Britski and Julio C. Garavello with Microlepidogaster guntheri as its only species, and designated as its type species. M. guntheri was first formally described in 1918 by the Brazilian zoologist Alípio de Miranda Ribeiro with its type locality given as the Ilha de Sao Sebastiao in the Brazilian state of São Paulo. Eschmeyer's Catalog of Fishes classified the genus Schizolecis in the subfamily Hypoptopomatinae, the cascudinhos, within the suckermouth armored catfish family Loricariidae.

== Etymology ==
Schizolecis combines Schizo meaning "split" or "cleave" with lekos , which in this case the autors say means "plate", a reference to the plates on the sbout being the same size as those on the head. The specific name honours the specimen collector Francisco Günther, who collected specimens for the Museu Paulista, University of São Paulo, including holotype of this catfish.

== Distribution and habitat ==
Schizolecis occurs mainly in coastal rivers of the Atlantic Forest in southeastern and southern Brazil. These fish inhabit streams with rocky and sandy bottom, mostly in shallows and backwaters up to 30 centimetres (12 in) deep, with slow water flow.

== Appearance and anatomy ==
Schizolecis reaches a maximum length of 4.0 centimetres (1.6 in) SL in males and 3 cm (1.2 in) SL in females. Normally pigmented specimens of S. guntheri have a dark background color on the body and caudal fin, with some light spots and an unpigmented ventral body surface. These fish have been found in an albino form in their natural habitat.

== Ecology ==
Schizolecis forage mostly during the day, though some night activity has also been recorded. These fish graze on microscopic algae, mostly diatoms and green algae growing on rocks and submerged vegetation. They occasionally take chironomid and simuliid larvae. Before grazing on a patch with dense sediment, a fish makes wiggling head-down movements to dislodge sediment. When scraping algae off the substrate, it makes vigorous mouth movements, and moves by jerky movements probably related to its mouth alternating between grazing and attaching to the substrate. Grazing leaves characteristic, parallel and elongated marks on the substrate.
