= Otothyris =

Scientific classification
- Kingdom: Animalia
- Phylum: Chordata
- Class: Actinopterygii
- Order: Siluriformes
- Family: Loricariidae
- Subfamily: Hypoptopomatinae
- Genus: Otothyris; Myers, 1927

Type species
- Otothyris canaliferus Myers, 1927

Genus of fishes

Otothyris is a genus of freshwater ray-finned fishes belonging to the family Loricariidae, the suckermouth armored catfishes, and the subfamily Hypoptopomatinae, the cascudinhos. The catfishes in this genus are mostly found in Brazil, with one species extending southwards into Uruguay.

== Species ==
Otothyris contains the following valid species:

- Otothyris juquiae Garavello, Britski & Schaefer, 1998
- Otothyris lophophanes (C. H. Eigenmann & R. S. Eigenmann, 1889)
- Otothyris rostrata Garavello, Britski & Schaefer, 1998
- Otothyris travassosi Garavello, Britski & Schaefer, 1998

== Distribution ==
The genus Otothyris is distributed along the Atlantic coast of Brazil between Barra do Ribeiro, Guaíba River Basin of Rio Grande do Sul State in the south to the Jequitinhonha River Basin of Bahia State in the north. The species are apparently restricted to the lowland sections of these river systems near the coast and have not been collected further to the west in higher elevation or headwater streams. The distribution of O. rostrata extends southwards into Uruguay.

== Description ==
Otothyris species have a laterally-placed eye that does not have an iris diverticulum. The head and margin of the snout have enlarged odontodes arranged in dorsal and lateral series. The pectoral skeleton is completely exposed from below and bears strong odontodes. The supraoccipital has paired anterior odontode crests and a posterior midline crest.

Immature specimens of Otothyris species, as in most species of the Hypoptopomatinae, exhibit salient crests or ridges of enlarged odontodes on the posterodorsal region of the supraoccipital and pterotic-supracleithrum bones. In O. lophophanes, O. juquiae, and O. rostrata, these odontode crests are retained in adults and the regions of the head between crests form deep depressions with growth.

Within Otothyris, O. lophophanes, O. juquiae, and O. rostrata have larger and more extensive odontode crests, more pronounced odontode ridges, larger swimbladder capsule, and larger pterotic fenestrae, in comparison with O. travassosi, which has smaller, shorter odontode crests and less pronounced ridges, a relatively small swimbladder capsule, and smaller pterotic fenestrae. Otothyris lophophanes has a single series of downturned rostral odontodes separated from a series of upturned odontodes along the dorsal rostral margin by a distinct, broad linear discontinuity, which extends laterally to a line through the anterior nares; however, in all other members of the genus, the ventral downturned odontodes comprise more than one series and are not separated from the dorsal odontodes by a broad linear discontinuity. Otothyris species also differ in tooth counts, lateral line and abdominal plates, and morphometrics.
