= Scott Allen Schaefer =

American ichthyologist

- Born: 1958 (age 67–68)
- Education: Ohio State University, University of South Carolina, University of Chicago
- Scientific career
- Fields: Ichthyology
- Institutions: American Museum of Natural History

Scott Allen Schaefer (born 1958) is an American ichthyologist working at the American Museum of Natural History as the dean of science for collections, exhibitions, and the public understanding of science; he serves as the curator-in-charge, in the department of ichthyology, within the division of vertebrate zoology.

In addition, he is the director of the Sackler Institute for Comparative Genomics and a professor, Richard Gilder Graduate School. He is an adjunct senior research scientist, with The Earth Institute Center for Environmental Sustainability (EICES), The Earth Institute Adjunct Research Scientist, with the department of ichthyology, Columbia Climate School.

== Education ==
Schaefer attended Ohio State University, where he received a Bachelor of Science degree in 1980. He attended University of South Carolina, where he received his master's in science in 1982. He received his Ph.D. from the University of Chicago, in 1986

== Career ==
Schaefer studies the systematics, biogeography, and evolutionary morphology of tropical freshwater fishes of Africa and South America. His research seeks to resolve problems in taxonomy, classification, and evolution in those fish groups that dominate the ecology of riverine systems, such as catfishes and characiforms. Fieldwork involves discovery of undescribed fish diversity in poorly known regions, such as the Amazon and Orinoco Rivers of South America. Current projects include systematics and biogeography of Andean freshwater fishes and taxonomic revision of the family Astroblepidae, a group of catfishes that live at high elevations in the Andes of South America. He is also engaged in phylogenetic studies of the trichomycterid catfishes and revisions of African alestid characiform fishes. Recent fieldwork in Peru, Ecuador, and Venezuela has surveyed the diversity of Andean fishes up to 4,500 m (14,760 ft.) elevation and resulted in the addition to the Museum of several new and important collections.

== Legacy ==
- The fish Rhinolekos schaeferi Martins & Langeani, 2011 was named after him.
- Panaque schaeferi Lujan, Hidalgo & Stewart, 2010 as was this fish.

== Selected publications ==
- Schaefer, S. A., 2012. Ethiopian airpower: from inception to victory in the Ogaden War, University of Florida
- Schaefer, S.A., Chakrabarty, P., Geneva, A., and Sabaj Pérez, M.H. 2011. Nucleotide sequence data confirm diagnosis and local endemism of variable morphospecies of Andean astroblepid catfishes (Siluriformes: Astroblepidae). Zoological Journal of the Linnean Society, 162:90-102.
- Schaefer, S.A. 2011. The Andes: Riding the tectonic uplift, Chapter 16, p. 259-278. In: Historical Biogeography of Neotropical Freshwater Fishes, J.S. Albert and R.E. Reis (eds.), University of California Press, Berkeley.
- Schaefer, S.A. and J. Arroyave. 2010. Rivers as islands: determinants of the distribution of Andean astroblepid catfishes. Journal of Fish Biology, 77:2373-2390.
- Aquino, A.E., and S.A. Schaefer. 2010. Systematics of the genus Hypoptopoma Günther, 1868 (Siluriformes, Loricariidae). Bulletin of the American Museum of Natural History, no. 336, 110 pp.
- Schaefer, S.A. 2010. [review of] Gonorynchiformes and Ostariophysan Relationships: A Comprehensive Review, by Terry Grande (senior volume editor), Francisco José Poyato-Ariza and Rui Diogo (volume co-editors), Enfield (New Hampshire): Science Publishers, x+587 p.; ill.; index, 2010. Quart. Rev. Biol. 85:516-517.
- Schaefer, S.A., and L. Fernández. 2009. Redescription of the Pez Graso, Rhizosomichthys totae (Trichomycteridae), of Lago de Tota, Colombia, and aspects of cranial osteology revealed by microtomography. Copeia, 2009(3):513-525.
- Fernández, L., and S.A. Schaefer. 2009. Relationships among the Neotropical Candirus (Trichomycteridae, Siluriformes) and the evolution of parasitism based on analysis of mitochondrial and nuclear gene sequences. Molecular Phylogenetics and Evolution, 52(2):416-423.
- Schaefer, S.A. 2009. Family Loricariidae, Subfamily Hypoptopomatinae. p. 38-39. In: Checklist of the Freshwater Fishes of the Guiana Shield, R.P. Vari, C.J. Ferraris, Jr., A. Radosavljevic, V.A. Funk (eds.), Bulletin of the Biological Society of Washington, no. 17.
- Schaefer, Scott Allen. 2008.The Lithogeninae (Siluriformes, Loricariidae) : anatomy, interrelationships, and description of a new species. American Museum of Natural History, American Museum novitates, no. 3637
- Schaefer, Scott Allen. 2003.Relationships of Lithogenes villosus Eigenmann, 1909 (Siluriformes, Loricariidae) : evidence from high-resolution computed microtomography. American Museum of Natural History, American Museum novitates, no. 3401.
- Schaefer, Scott Allen and the Academy of Natural Sciences in Philadelphia. 1997. The Neotropical cascudinhos : systematics and biogeography of the Otocinclus catfishes (Siluriformes: Loricariidae)
- Schaefer, Scott Allen. 1987. Osteology of Hypostomus Plecostomus (Linnaeus): With a Phylogenetic Analysis of the Loricariid Subfamilies (Pisces, Siluroidei). Natural History Museum of Los Angeles County, Issue 394 of Contributions in science Linnaeus, With a Phylogenetic Analysis of the Loricarid Subfamilies. ISBN 9998086388, 9789998086388, 31 pages.
- Schaefer, Scott Allen. Review of the neotropical catfish genus Scoloplax (Pisces : Loricarioidea: Scoloplacidae)
- Schaefer, Scott Allen. 1986. Historical Biology of the Loricariid Catfishes: Phylogenetics and Functional Morphology, University of Chicago, Committee on Evolutionary Biology, 580 pages.
- Schaefer, Scott Allen. 1982. Variability in abundance of the summer-spawned ichthyoplankton community of North Inlet Estuary, South Carolina

== See also ==
- Category:Taxa named by Scott Allen Schaefer
