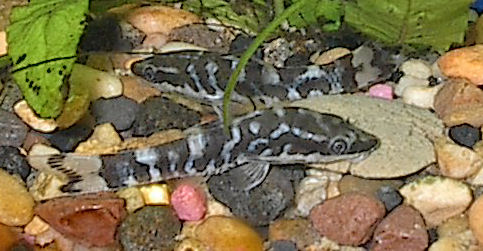
- Otocinclus cocama

Scientific classification
- Kingdom: Animalia
- Phylum: Chordata
- Class: Actinopterygii
- Order: Siluriformes
- Family: Loricariidae
- Subfamily: Hypoptopomatinae; C. H. Eigenmann & R. S. Eigenmann, 1890

Genera
- see text

= Hypoptopomatinae =

Subfamily of fishes

The Hypoptopomatinae are a subfamily of catfishes (order Siluriformes) of the family Loricariidae, composed of 32 genera and approximately 265 species. This subfamily represents about one-tenth of all loricariid species.

Eschmeyer's Catalog of Fishes does not recognise tribes within the Loricariidae, but other authorities have divided this taxon into three tribes, Hypoptopomatini, Neoplecostomini and Otothyrini. However, in a 2005 analysis, Otothyrini was found to not be monophyletic, with its representatives comprising a paraphyletic group in relation to the tribe Hypoptopomatini. More recent phylogenetic evidence shows that Hypoptopomatini and Otothyrini, while each are monophyletic tribes, do not form a monophyletic subfamily, and therefore should each be recognized as their own individual subfamilies. Problematically, the most recent Hypoptopomatine genera, Gymnotocinclus and Rhinolekos, were not classified in either of the tribes. Gymnotocinclus was subsequently invalidated when it was synonymised with Corumbataia in 2019.

Almost all species of Hypoptopomatinae have a diploid number of 2n = 54; this group is karyotypically very conserved.

Hypoptopomatinae are distributed east of the Andes in South America from Venezuela to northern Argentina. Most of the hypoptopomatine species are usually found at or near the water surface, typically in close association with riverbank vegetation or some subsurface structure.

== Genera ==
Hypoptopomatinae contains the following genera:

- Acestridium Haseman, 1911
- Chauliocheilos Martins, Andrade, Rosa & Langeani, 2014
- Corumbataia Britski, 1997
- Curculionichthys Roxo, G. S. C. Silva, L. E. Ochoa & Oliveira, 2015
- Epactionotus Reis & Schaefer, 1998
- Eurycheilichthys Reis & Schaefer, 1993
- Euryochus E. H. L. Pereira & Reis, 2017
- Hirtella E. H. L. Pereira, Zanata, Cetra & Reis, 2014
- Hisonotus C. H. Eigenmann & R. S. Eigenmann, 1889
- Hypoptopoma Günther, 1868
- Isbrueckerichthys Derijst, 1996
- Kronichthys A. Miranda Ribeiro, 1908
- Lampiella Isbrücker, 2001
- Leptotocinclus Delapieve, Lehmann A & Reis, 2018
- Microlepidogaster C. H. Eigenmann & R. S. Eigenmann, 1889
- Nannoptopoma Schaefer, 1996
- Nannoxyropsis Delapieve, Lehmann A & Reis, 2018
- Neoplecostomus C. H. Eigenmann & R. S. Eigenmann, 1888
- Niobichthys Schaefer & Provenzano, 1998
- Otocinclus Cope, 1871
- Otothyris Myers, 1927
- Otothyropsis Ribeiro, Carvalho & A. Melo, 2005
- Oxyropsis C. H. Eigenmann & R. S. Eigenmann, 1889
- Pareiorhaphis A. Miranda Ribeiro, 1918
- Pareiorhina Gosline, 1947
- Parotocinclus C. H. Eigenmann & R. S. Eigenmann, 1889
- Plesioptopoma Reis, Pereira & Lehmann A., 2012
- Pseudotocinclus Nichols, 1919
- Pseudotothyris Britski & Garavello, 1984
- Rhinolekos Martins & Langeani, 2011
- Rhinotocinclus Reis & Lehmann A., 2022
- Schizolecis Britski & Garavello, 1984
