= Limatulichthys nasarcus =

Conservation status
- Data Deficient (IUCN 3.1)

Scientific classification
- Kingdom: Animalia
- Phylum: Chordata
- Class: Actinopterygii
- Order: Siluriformes
- Family: Loricariidae
- Genus: Limatulichthys
- Species: L. nasarcus

Binomial name
- Limatulichthys nasarcus Londoño-Burbano, Lefebvre & Lujan, 2014

Species of catfish

Limatulichthys nasarcus is a species of freshwater ray-finned fish belonging to the family Loricariidae, the suckermouth armored catfishes, and the subfamily Loricariinae, the mailed catfishes. This catfish is endemic to Venezuela, where it occurs in the middle Ventuari River and the lower Caura River in the Orinoco drainage basin. This species reaches a standard length of 15.1 cm (5.9 in). Its specific epithet, nasarcus, is derived from Latin and means "bow-shaped snout", referring to the species' snout, which is more rounded than that of its congener L. griseus.
