= Limatulichthys petleyi =

Scientific classification
- Kingdom: Animalia
- Phylum: Chordata
- Class: Actinopterygii
- Division: Teleostei
- Order: Siluriformes
- Family: Loricariidae
- Genus: Limatulichthys
- Species: L. petleyi

Binomial name
- Limatulichthys petleyi (Fowler, 1940)

Synonyms
- Rhineloricaria petleyi Fowler, 1940; Loricaria punctata Regan, 1904; Limatulichthys punctatus (Regan, 1904)

Species of fish

Limatulichthys petleyi is a species of freshwater ray-finned fish belonging to the family Loricariidae, the suckermouth armored catfishes, and the subfamily Loricariinae, the mailed catfishes. This catfish is found in the Amazon, Tocantins and Parnaíba River basins in Brazil and Peru.

== Taxonomy ==
Limatulichthys petleyi was first formally described as Loricaria punctata in 1904 by the English ichthyologist Charles Tate Regan with its type locality given as Manaus, Rio Negro and Porto de Moz in Brazil. However, this name was preoccupied by Loricaria punctata Kner, 1854 and, in 1940, Henry Weed Fowler described Rhineloricaria petleyi from Contamana in the Ucayali basin in Peru. This taxon has been regarded as a synonym of Limatulichthys griseus but in 2001 Isaäc J. H. Isbrücker removed it from the synonymy of L. griseus and Eschmeyer's Catalog of Fishes treats it as a vaild species, L. petleyi. As Loricaria punctata this is the type species of the genus Limatulichthys, a genus which is included in the subfamily Loricariinae of the family Loricariidae. This family is part of the suborder Loricarioidei within the catfish order Siluriformes.

== Etymology ==
Limatulichthys petleyi is the type species of the genus Limatulichthys, this name suffixes the Greek word for "fish", ichthys, onto the Latin word limatulus, meaning "somewhat polished". The specific name honors Robert T. Petley of Cleveland, Ohio who was an assistent to William C. Morrow who collected fishes for the Philadelphia Academy of Natural Sciences on a 1937 expedition to the Ucayali River basin in Peru.

== Distribution ==
Limatulichthys petleyi is found in South America where it occurs in the basins of the Amazon, Tocantins and Parnaíba rivers in Brazil and Peru.
