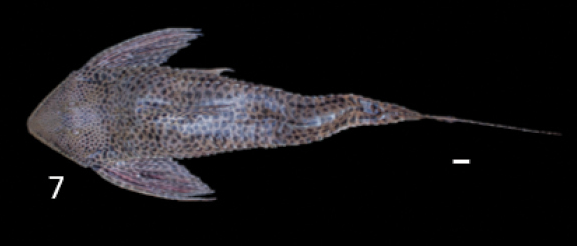

Conservation status
- Least Concern (IUCN 3.1)

Scientific classification
- Kingdom: Animalia
- Phylum: Chordata
- Class: Actinopterygii
- Order: Siluriformes
- Family: Loricariidae
- Genus: Proloricaria
- Species: P. lentiginosa

Binomial name
- Proloricaria lentiginosa Isbrücker, 1979

Synonyms
- Loricaria prolixa lentiginosa Isbrücker, 1979; Loricaria lentiginosa Isbrücker, 1979

= Proloricaria lentiginosa =

Species of fish

Proloricaria lentiginosa is a species of freshwater ray-finned fish belonging to the family Loricariidae, the suckermouth armored catfishes, and the subfamily Loricariinae, the mailed catfishes. This catfish is endemic to the upper Paraná River basin in Brazil. It reaches a standard length of 51.4 cm (20.2 in) and is believed to be a facultative air-breather. The species was described by Dutch ichthyologist Isaäc J. H. Isbrücker in 1979. This taxon has been considered to be a junior synonym of P. prolixa but molecular studies have validated its status as a separate species.

It is a mouthbrooder.
