= Paraloricaria agastor =

Conservation status
- Least Concern (IUCN 3.1)

Scientific classification
- Kingdom: Animalia
- Phylum: Chordata
- Class: Actinopterygii
- Order: Siluriformes
- Family: Loricariidae
- Genus: Paraloricaria
- Species: P. agastor

Binomial name
- Paraloricaria agastor Isbrücker, 1979

Species of fish

Paraloricaria agastor is a species of freshwater ray-finned fish belonging to the family Loricariidae, the suckermouth armored catfishes, and the subfamily Loricariinae, the mailed catfishes. This catfish is found in the Paraguay River basin in Corrientes Province in Argentina and in Paraguay. This species grows to a standard length of 10.8 cm (4.3 in).
