= Harttiella pilosa =

Conservation status
- Critically Endangered (IUCN 3.1)

Scientific classification
- Kingdom: Animalia
- Phylum: Chordata
- Class: Actinopterygii
- Order: Siluriformes
- Family: Loricariidae
- Genus: Harttiella
- Species: H. pilosa

Binomial name
- Harttiella pilosa Covain & Fisch-Muller, 2012

Species of catfish

Harttiella pilosa is a species of freshwater ray-finned fish belonging to the family Loricariidae, the suckermouth armored catfishes, and the subfamily Loricariinae, the mailed catfishes. It is native to South America, where it occurs in the Orapu River basin in the Tortue Mountains of French Guiana. The type locality of the species is the area directly upstream and downstream of a 30 m (98 ft) high waterfall. This environment is a 10 m (33 ft) wide river channel with shallow, clear water and a substrate composed of gravel, pebbles, boulders, bedrock, and iron-rich sand. This species reaches a standard length of 4 cm (1.6 in). It was described in 2012 as part of a taxonomic review of members of the loricariid tribe Harttiini native to the Guianas.
