= Brochiloricaria macrodon =

Conservation status
- Least Concern (IUCN 3.1)

Scientific classification
- Kingdom: Animalia
- Phylum: Chordata
- Class: Actinopterygii
- Division: Teleostei
- Order: Siluriformes
- Family: Loricariidae
- Genus: Brochiloricaria
- Species: B. macrodon

Binomial name
- Brochiloricaria macrodon (Kner, 1853)

Synonyms
- Loricaria macrodon Kner, 1853; Brachyloricaria macrodon (Kner, 1853)

Species of fish

Brochiloricaria macrodon is a species of freshwater ray-finned fish belonging to the family Loricariidae and the subfamily Loricariinae, the armored catfishes. This catfish is found in South America, where it is endemic to the basin of the Paraguay River in Brazil, where it has only been recorded four times, three of which have now been inundated by the Manso Dam. However, much of the area is in its natural state, and the IUCN classify this species as Least Concern. B. macrodon has a maximum recorded standard length of 28.6 cm (11.3 in).
