= Harttiella intermedia =

Conservation status
- Critically Endangered (IUCN 3.1)

Scientific classification
- Kingdom: Animalia
- Phylum: Chordata
- Class: Actinopterygii
- Order: Siluriformes
- Family: Loricariidae
- Genus: Harttiella
- Species: H. intermedia

Binomial name
- Harttiella intermedia Covain & Fisch-Muller, 2012

Species of catfish

Harttiella intermedia is a species of freshwater ray-finned fish belonging to the family Loricariidae, the suckermouth armored catfishes, and the subfamily Loricariinae, the mailed catfishes. This catfish is known only from the headwaters of Crique Grand Leblond on Trinité Massif in French Guiana. This species reaches a standard length of 3.5 cm (1.4 in). It was described in 2012 as part of a taxonomic review of members of the loricariid tribe Harttiini native to the Guianas.
