= Crossoloricaria cephalaspis =

Conservation status
- Least Concern (IUCN 3.1)

Scientific classification
- Kingdom: Animalia
- Phylum: Chordata
- Class: Actinopterygii
- Order: Siluriformes
- Family: Loricariidae
- Genus: Crossoloricaria
- Species: C. cephalaspis

Binomial name
- Crossoloricaria cephalaspis Isbrücker, 1979

Species of fish

Crossoloricaria cephalaspis is a species of freshwater ray-finned fish belonging to the family Loricariidae, the armored suckermouth catfishes, and the subfamily Loricariinae, the mailed catfishes. It is endemic to Colombia where it is found in the Magdalena River basin. This species grows to a standard length of 10.9 cm (4.3 in). The specific name, cephalaspis, is the name of a fossil ostracoderm which the describer, Isbrücker, stated this species bore a "striking resemblance" to.
