= Metaloricaria nijsseni =

Conservation status
- Least Concern (IUCN 3.1)

Scientific classification
- Kingdom: Animalia
- Phylum: Chordata
- Class: Actinopterygii
- Order: Siluriformes
- Family: Loricariidae
- Genus: Metaloricaria
- Species: M. nijsseni

Binomial name
- Metaloricaria nijsseni (Boeseman, 1976)

Synonyms
- Harttia nijsseni Boeseman, 1976

Species of fish

Metaloricaria nijsseni is a species of freshwater ray-finned fish belonging to the family Loricariidae, the suckermouth armored catfishes, and the subfamily Loricariinae, the mailed catfishes. This catfish is endemic to Suriname where it is found in the drainages of the Corantijne, Sipaliwini, Nickerie, Saramacca and Suriname rivers. This species reaches a maximum standard length 29.5 cm (11.6 in).

M. nijsseni was first formally described as Harttia nijsseni in 1976 by the Dutch ichthyologist Marinus Boeseman with its type locality given as the Sipaliwini River in southwestern Suriname. The specific name honors the Dutch ichthyologist Han Nijssen of the Zoölogisch Museum, Amsterdam in recognition of his work on Neotropical catfishes.
