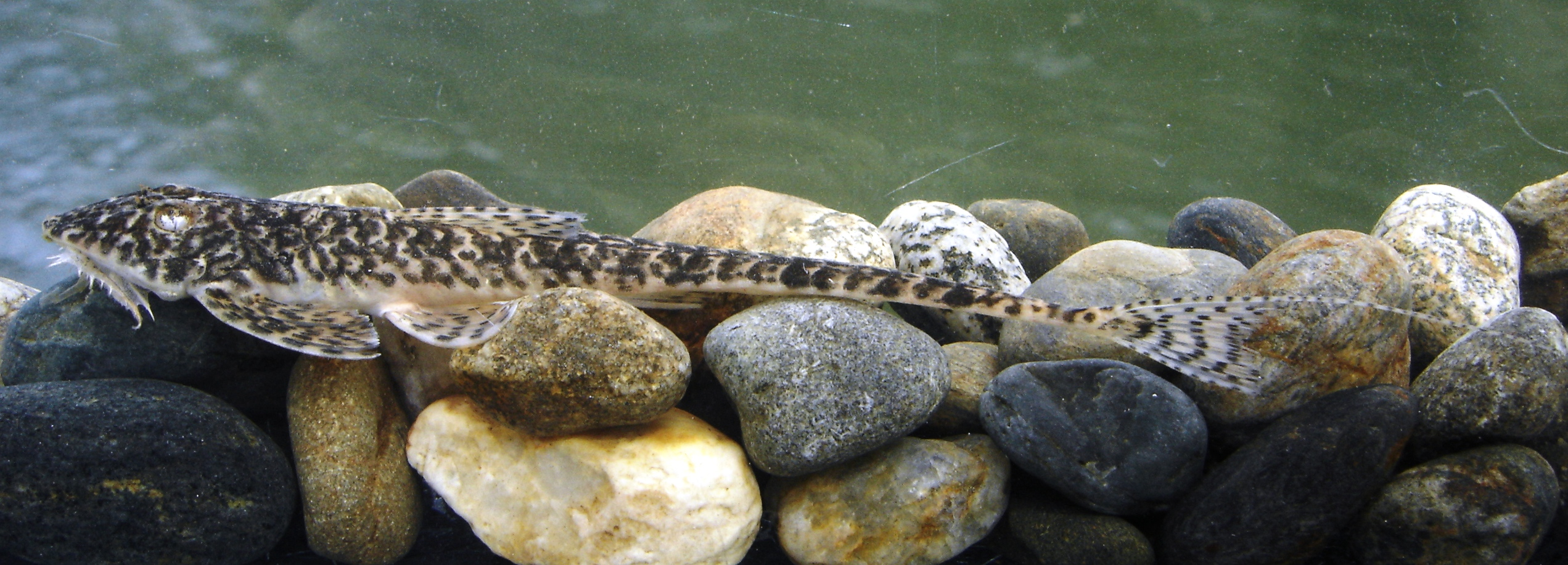

Conservation status
- Least Concern (IUCN 3.1)

Scientific classification
- Kingdom: Animalia
- Phylum: Chordata
- Class: Actinopterygii
- Order: Siluriformes
- Family: Loricariidae
- Genus: Crossoloricaria
- Species: C. variegata

Binomial name
- Crossoloricaria variegata (Steindachner, 1879)

Synonyms
- Loricaria variegata Steindachner, 1879

= Crossoloricaria variegata =

Species of fish

Crossoloricaria variegata is a species of freshwater ray-finned fish belonging to the family Loricariidae, the armored suckermouth catfishes, and the subfamily Loricariinae, the mailed catfishes. This catfish is found in Panama where it is found in the Mamoní, Tuira and Yape River basins; and in Colombia where it is found in the Pacific versant San Juan and the Atlantic versant Magdalena Atrato and Sinú River basins. This species grows to a standard length of 26.5 cm (10.4 in).
