= Loricaria punctata =

Loricara punctata is a binomial which may refer to either of the following species as a junior synonym:

- Limatulichthys petleyi (Fowler, 1940)
- Pterygoplichthys punctatus (Kner, 1854)
