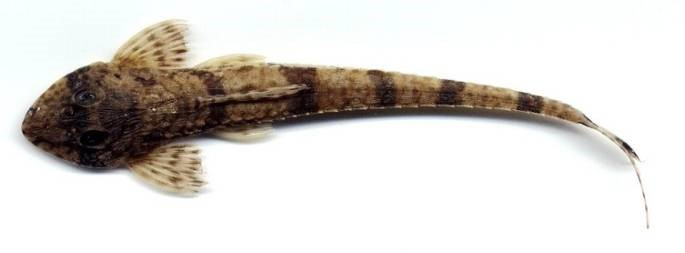

Conservation status
- Least Concern (IUCN 3.1)

Scientific classification
- Kingdom: Animalia
- Phylum: Chordata
- Class: Actinopterygii
- Division: Teleostei
- Order: Siluriformes
- Family: Loricariidae
- Genus: Dasyloricaria
- Species: D. filamentosa

Binomial name
- Dasyloricaria filamentosa (Steindachner, 1878)

Synonyms
- Loricaria filamentosae Steindachner, 1878; Rineloricaria filamentosa (Steindachner, 1878); Loricaria filamentosa seminuda C. H. Eigenmann & Vance, 1912

= Whiptail catfish =

Species of fish

Whiptail catfish (Dasyloricaria filamentosa) is a species of freshwater ray-finned fish belonging to the family Loricariidae, the armored suckermouth catfishes, and the subfamily Loricariinae, the mailed catfishes. This catfish is found in Colombia and Venezuela where it is found in the Magdalena River basin and is suspected to also occur in the Catatumbo River, it has also been collected from the Cauca River. This species grows to a standard length of 26 cm (10 in). D. filamentosa is found in the aquarium trade.
