= Dasyloricaria paucisquama =

Scientific classification
- Kingdom: Animalia
- Phylum: Chordata
- Class: Actinopterygii
- Order: Siluriformes
- Family: Loricariidae
- Genus: Dasyloricaria
- Species: D. paucisquama

Binomial name
- Dasyloricaria paucisquama Londoño-Burbano & R. E. dos Reis, 2016

Species of catfish

Dasyloricaria paucisquama is a species of freshwater ray-finned fish belonging to the family Loricariidae, the armored suckermouth catfishes, and the subfamily Loricariinae, the mailed catfishes.. This catfish is found in South America, where it occurs in the upper and middle Magdalena River basin in Colombia. The species reaches a standard length of 20.3 cm (8.0 in). Its specific epithet, paucisquama, is derived from Latin and refers to the low number of central abdominal plates typical of the species.
