= Harttiella lucifer =

Conservation status
- Critically Endangered (IUCN 3.1)

Scientific classification
- Kingdom: Animalia
- Phylum: Chordata
- Class: Actinopterygii
- Order: Siluriformes
- Family: Loricariidae
- Genus: Harttiella
- Species: H. lucifer

Binomial name
- Harttiella lucifer Covain & Fisch-Muller, 2012

Species of catfish

Harttiella lucifer is a species of freshwater ray-finned fish belonging to the family Loricariidae, the suckermouth armored catfishes, and the subfamily Loricariinae, the mailed catfishes. This catfish occurs in the vicinity of Lucifer Massif and Galbao Massif in central French Guiana. This species reaches a standard length of 4.3 cm (1.7 in). It is known to occur alongside the species Anablepsoides igneus and members of the genus Ituglanis. The species was described in 2012 as part of a taxonomic review of members of the loricariid tribe Harttiini native to the Guianas.
