= Harttiella janmoli =

Conservation status
- Critically Endangered (IUCN 3.1)

Scientific classification
- Kingdom: Animalia
- Phylum: Chordata
- Class: Actinopterygii
- Order: Siluriformes
- Family: Loricariidae
- Genus: Harttiella
- Species: H. janmoli

Binomial name
- Harttiella janmoli Covain & Fisch-Muller, 2012

Species of catfish

Harttiella janmoli is a species of freshwater ray-finned fish belonging to the family Loricariidae, the suckermouth armored catfishes, and the subfamily Loricariinae, the mailed catfishes. This catfish is known only from a small forest creek near Cottica Mountain in French Guiana, at an elevation of 515 m (1,690 ft) above sea level. This species reaches a standard length of 4.7 cm (1.9 in).. It was described in 2012 as part of a taxonomic review of members of the loricariid tribe Harttiini native to the Guianas.
