= Dasyloricaria latiura =

Conservation status
- Near Threatened (IUCN 3.1)

Scientific classification
- Kingdom: Animalia
- Phylum: Chordata
- Class: Actinopterygii
- Order: Siluriformes
- Family: Loricariidae
- Genus: Dasyloricaria
- Species: D. latiura

Binomial name
- Dasyloricaria latiura (C. H. Eigenmann & Vance, 1912)

Synonyms
- Loricaria filamentosa latiura C. H. Eigenmann & Vance, 1912; Loricaria capetensis Meek & Hildebrand, 1913; Dasyloricaria capetensis (Meek & Hildebrand, 1913); Loricaria tuyrensis Meek & Hildebrand, 1913; Dasyloricaria tuyrensis (Meek & Hildebrand, 1913)

Species of fish

Dasyloricaria latiura is a species of freshwater ray-finned fish belonging to the family Loricariidae, the armored suckermouth catfishes, and the subfamily Loricariinae, the mailed catfishes. This catfish is found in Panama from the Bayano River south to the Tuira River, and in the Atrato River basin in Colombia. This species grows to a standard length of 35.5 cm (14.0 in).
