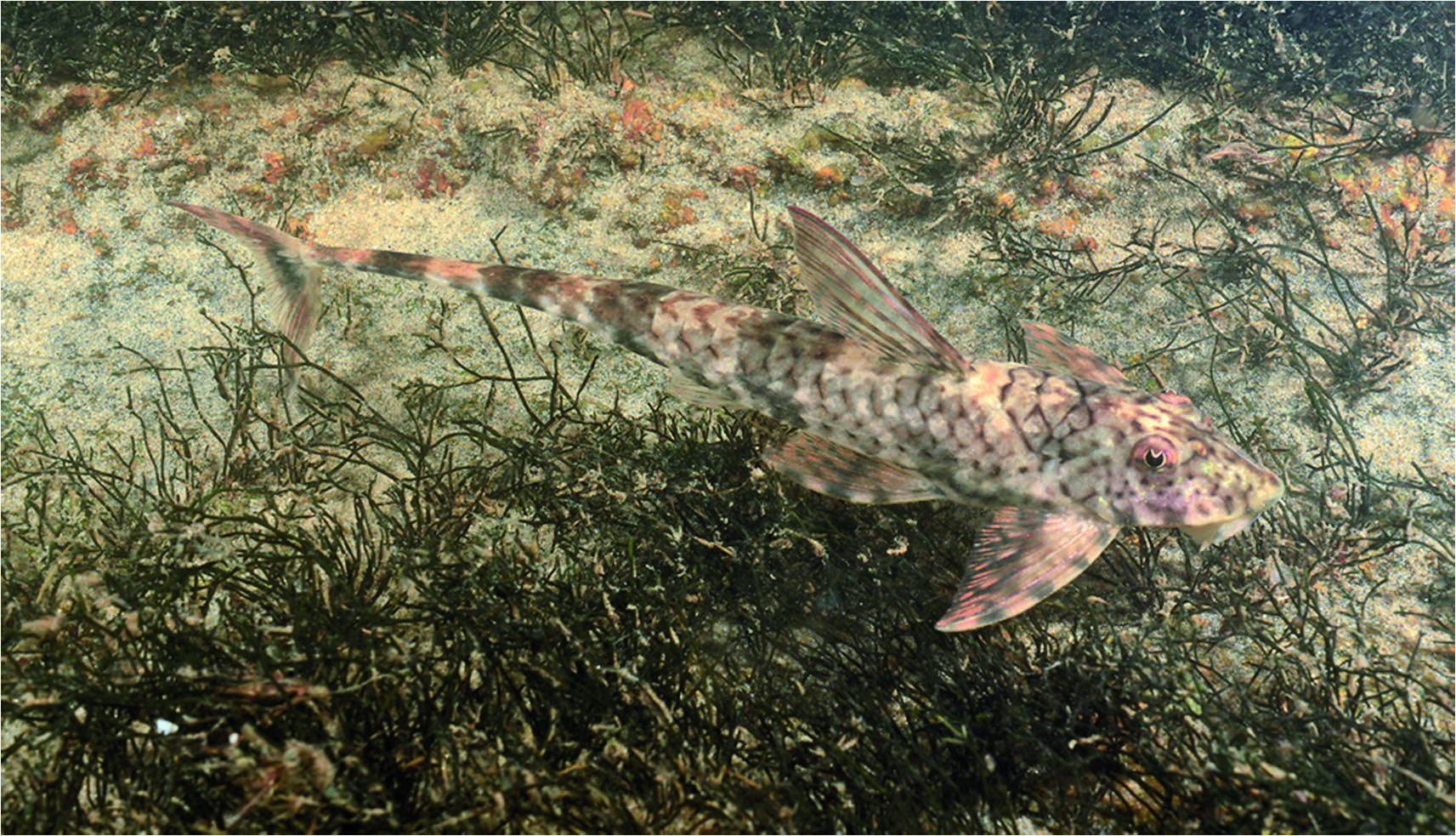

Conservation status
- Least Concern (IUCN 3.1)

Scientific classification
- Kingdom: Animalia
- Phylum: Chordata
- Class: Actinopterygii
- Order: Siluriformes
- Family: Loricariidae
- Genus: Cteniloricaria
- Species: C. platystoma

Binomial name
- Cteniloricaria platystoma (Günther, 1868)

Synonyms
- Loricaria playstoma Günther, 1868; Harttia platystoma (Günther, 1868); Parasturisoma maculata Boeseman, 1971; Harttia maculata (Boeseman, 1971); Cteniloricaria maculata (Boeseman, 1971)

= Cteniloricaria platystoma =

Species of fish

Cteniloricaria platystoma is a species of freshwater ray-finned fish belonging to the family Loricariidae, the armored suckermouth catfishes, and the subfamily Loricariinae, the mailed catfishes. This catfish is found in Suriname, Guyana and French Guiana in South America. This species grows to a length of 20 centimetres (7.9 in).
