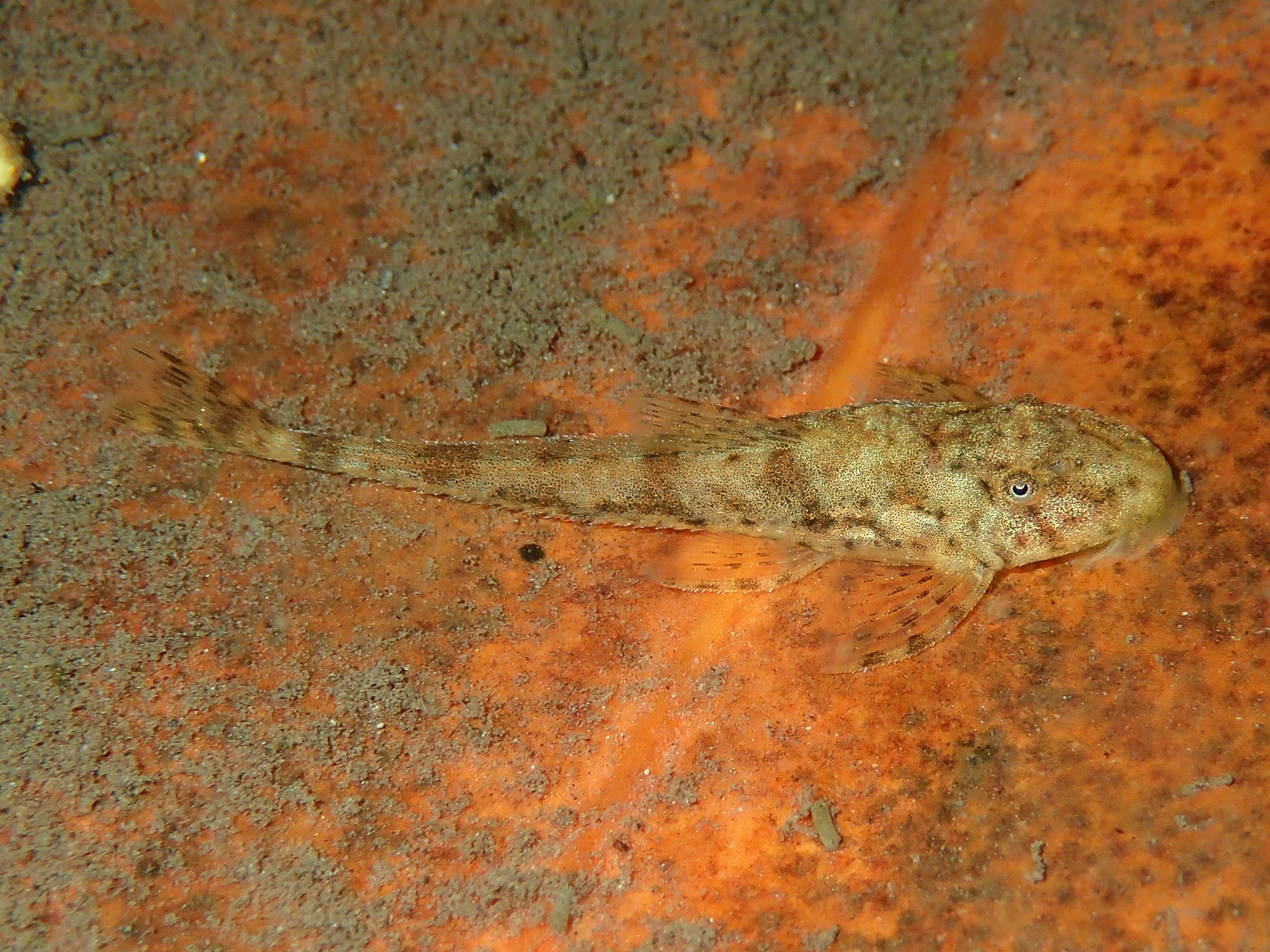

Conservation status
- Vulnerable (IUCN 3.1)

Scientific classification
- Kingdom: Animalia
- Phylum: Chordata
- Class: Actinopterygii
- Order: Siluriformes
- Family: Loricariidae
- Genus: Harttiella
- Species: H. longicauda

Binomial name
- Harttiella longicauda Covain & Fisch-Muller, 2012

= Harttiella longicauda =

Species of catfish

Harttiella longicauda is a species of freshwater ray-finned fish belonging to the family Loricariidae, the suckermouth armored catfishes, and the subfamily Loricariinae, the mailed catfishes. This catfish occurs in mountainous areas in the vicinity of Trinité Massif and Balenfois Massif in northern French Guiana. This species reaches a standard length of 5.2 cm (2.0 in). It is known to occur alongside the species Characidium fasciadorsale, Krobia itanyi, Lithoxus planquettei, and Rhamdia quelen, as well as members of the genera Ancistrus, Guyanancistrus, Melanocharacidium, and Rineloricaria. The species was described in 2012 as part of a taxonomic review of members of the loricariid tribe Harttiini native to the Guianas.
