= Crossoloricaria venezuelae =

Conservation status
- Least Concern (IUCN 3.1)

Scientific classification
- Kingdom: Animalia
- Phylum: Chordata
- Class: Actinopterygii
- Order: Siluriformes
- Family: Loricariidae
- Genus: Crossoloricaria
- Species: C. venezuelae

Binomial name
- Crossoloricaria venezuelae (L. P. Schultz, 1944)

Synonyms
- Loricaria variegata venezuelae Schultz, 1944

Species of fish

Crossoloricaria venezuelae is a species of freshwater ray-finned fish belonging to the family Loricariidae, the armored suckermouth catfishes, and the subfamily Loricariinae, the mailed catfishes. This catfish is found in the Lake Maracaibo drainage of Venezuela and Colombia. This species grows to a standard length of 18.3 cm (7.2 in).
