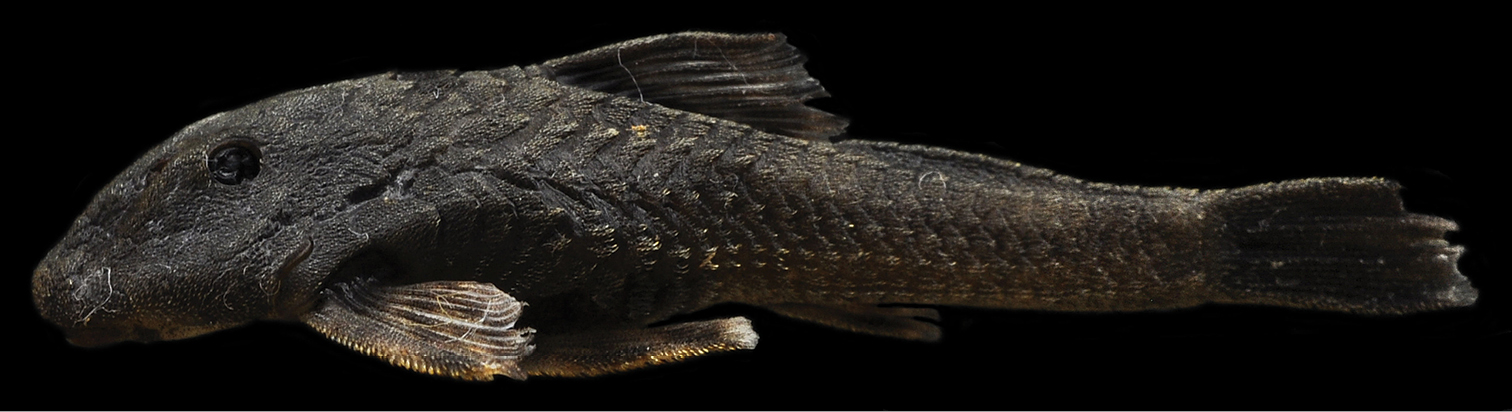
- Pareiorhina hyptiorhachis

Scientific classification
- Kingdom: Animalia
- Phylum: Chordata
- Class: Actinopterygii
- Division: Teleostei
- Order: Siluriformes
- Family: Loricariidae
- Subfamily: Neoplecostominae; Regan, 1904

Genera
- Hirtella Pereira, Zanata, Cetra & Reis, 2014; Isbrueckerichthys Derijst, 1996; Kronichthys Miranda-Ribeiro, 1908; Microplecostomus Silva, Roxo, Ochoa & Oliveira, 2016; Neoplecostomus Eigenmann & Eigenmann, 1888; Pareiorhaphis Miranda-Ribeiro, 1918; Pareiorhina Gosline, 1947

= Neoplecostominae =

Subfamily of fishes

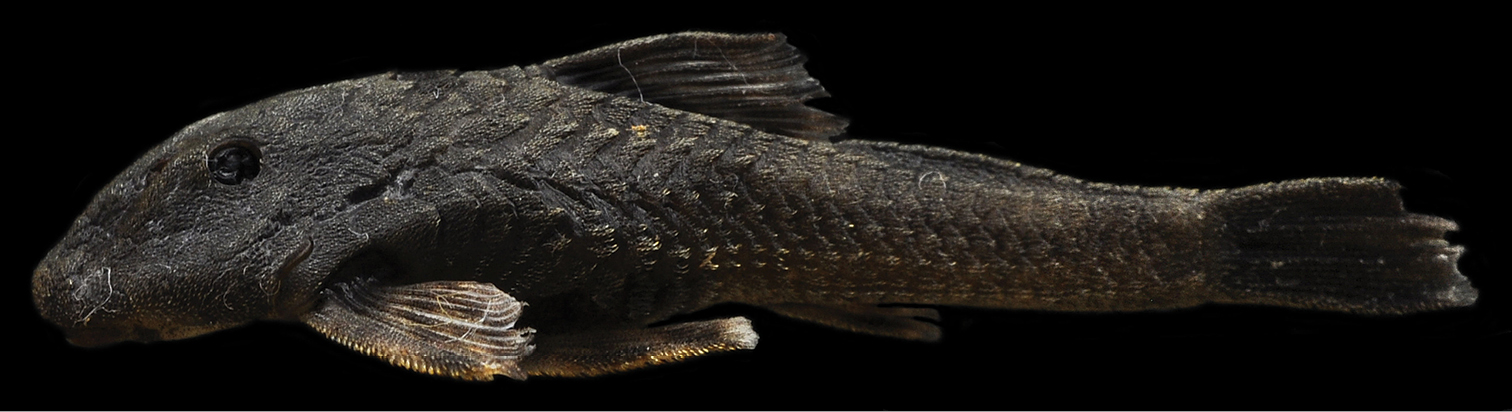

Neoplecostominae is a subfamily of South American catfishes of the family Loricariidae. Species of this subfamily live in high-mountain and swift-flowing river habitats.

== Taxonomy ==
Neoplectostominae is not recognized by Eschmeyer's Catalog of Fishes and the genera placed in this taxon are placed in the subfamily Hypoptopomatinae. This subfamily, if accepted as valid, is regarded as the most basal clade in Loricariidae with the exception of Lithogeneinae. The genera do not form a monophyletic assemblage. Neoplecostominae is not diagnosed by any unique characteristic. However, molecular studies have supported this grouping.

Within the paraphyletic Neoplecostominae, Pareiorhina forms a monophyletic subunit that also includes Neoplecostomus.
