= Paraloricaria commersonoides =

Conservation status
- Data Deficient (IUCN 3.1)

Scientific classification
- Kingdom: Animalia
- Phylum: Chordata
- Class: Actinopterygii
- Order: Siluriformes
- Family: Loricariidae
- Genus: Paraloricaria
- Species: P. commersonoides

Binomial name
- Paraloricaria commersonoides (Devincenzi, 1943)

Synonyms
- Loricaria commersonoides Devincenzi, 1943

Species of fish

Paraloricaria commersonoides is a species of freshwater ray-finned fish belonging to the family Loricariidae, the suckermouth armored catfishes, and the subfamily Loricariinae, the mailed catfishes. This catfish is found in the Uruguay River in Brazil and Uruguay. This species reaches a maximum length of 37 cm (15 in).
