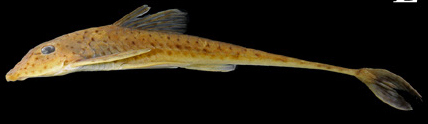

Conservation status
- Least Concern (IUCN 3.1)

Scientific classification
- Kingdom: Animalia
- Phylum: Chordata
- Class: Actinopterygii
- Order: Siluriformes
- Family: Loricariidae
- Genus: Cteniloricaria
- Species: C. napova

Binomial name
- Cteniloricaria napova Covain & Fisch-Muller, 2012

= Cteniloricaria napova =

Species of catfish

Cteniloricaria napova is a species of freshwater ray-finned fish belonging to the family Loricariidae, the armored suckermouth catfishes, and the subfamily Loricariinae, the mailed catfishes. It is found in South America, where it occurs in the upper Paru de Oeste River basin in Suriname. The species reaches 12.9 cm (5.1 in) in standard length and is believed to be a facultative air-breather. Its specific name, napova, is derived from the Tiriyó language and means "thank you", honoring the Tiriyó people of Sipaliwini District for collecting and providing specimens of the species.
