= Harttiella parva =

Conservation status
- Critically Endangered (IUCN 3.1)

Scientific classification
- Kingdom: Animalia
- Phylum: Chordata
- Class: Actinopterygii
- Order: Siluriformes
- Family: Loricariidae
- Genus: Harttiella
- Species: H. parva

Binomial name
- Harttiella parva Covain & Fisch-Muller, 2012

Species of catfish

Harttiella parva is a species of freshwater ray-finned fish sbelonging to the family Loricariidae, the suckermouth armored catfishes, and the subfamily Loricariinae, the mailed catfishes. This catfish is known only from a small forest creek in the Atachi Bakka Mountains in French Guiana. This species reaches a standard length of 3.1 cm (1.2 in). It was described in 2012 as part of a taxonomic review of members of the loricariid tribe Harttiini native to the Guianas.
