= Brochiloricaria chauliodon =

Conservation status
- Least Concern (IUCN 3.1)

Scientific classification
- Kingdom: Animalia
- Phylum: Chordata
- Class: Actinopterygii
- Order: Siluriformes
- Family: Loricariidae
- Genus: Brochiloricaria
- Species: B. chauliodon

Binomial name
- Brochiloricaria chauliodon Isbrücker, 1979

Species of fish

Brochiloricaria chauliodon, the orchid leather neck whiptail, is a species of freshwater ray-finned fish belonging to the family Loricariidae and the subfamily Loricariinae, the armored catfishes. This catfish is found in South America where it occurs in the Uruguay River in Brazil and the Río de la Plata basin in Argentina. It may also occur in Uruguay. It feeds on benthic molluscs, mostly native species, but is also known to feed on the invasive golden mussel (Limnoperna fortunei). This species grows to a maximum length of 28.2 cm (11.1 in).
