= Metaloricaria paucidens =

Conservation status
- Least Concern (IUCN 3.1)

Scientific classification
- Kingdom: Animalia
- Phylum: Chordata
- Class: Actinopterygii
- Order: Siluriformes
- Family: Loricariidae
- Genus: Metaloricaria
- Species: M. paucidens

Binomial name
- Metaloricaria paucidens Isbrücker, 1976

Species of fish

Metaloricaria paucidens is a species of freshwater ray-finned fish belonging to the family Loricariidae, the suckermouth armored catfishes, and the subfamily Loricariinae, the mailed catfishes. This catfish is found in Amapá, Brazil, French Guiana and Suriname, where it is found in the Oyapock and Marowijne River basins. This species grows to a standard length of 27 centimetres (11 in).
