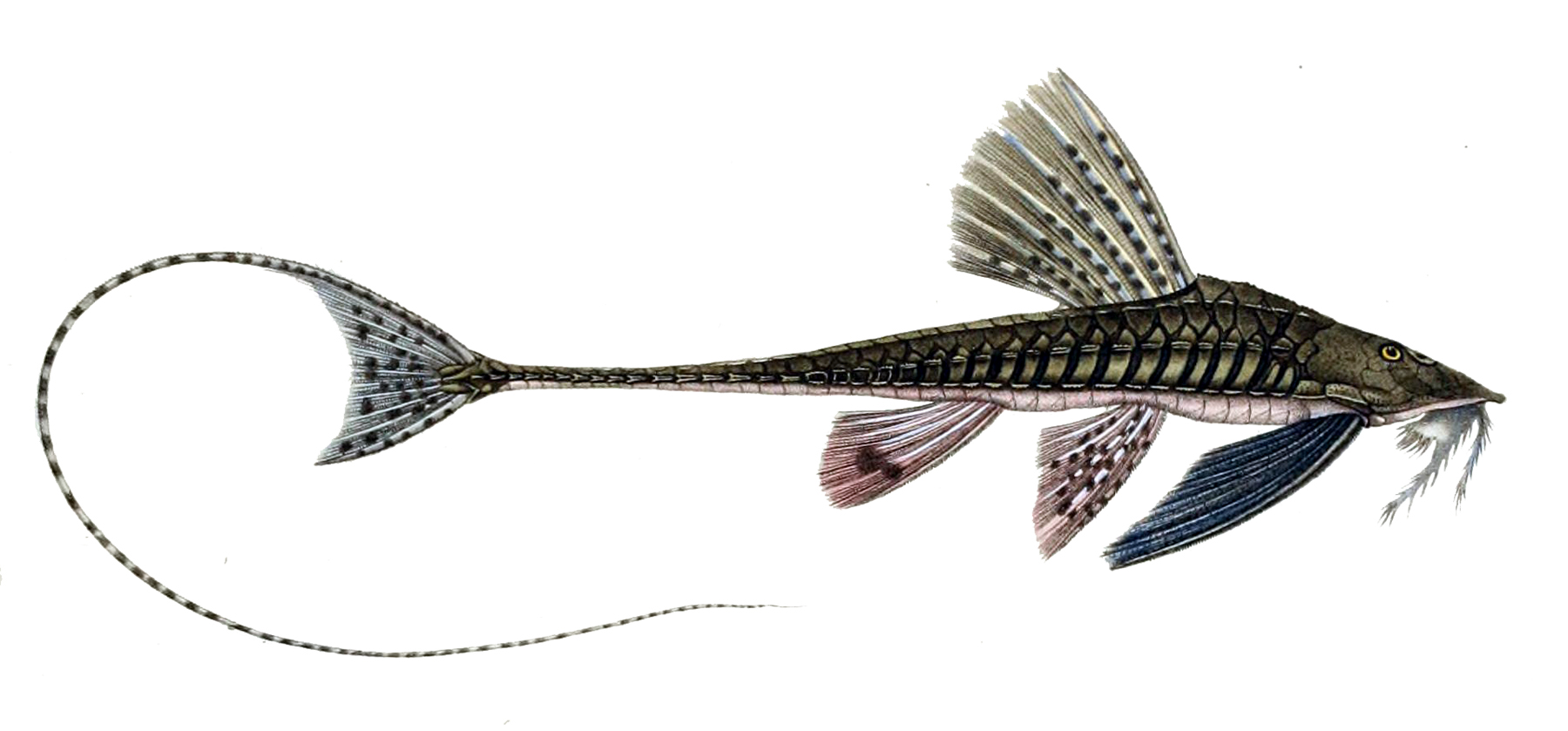

Conservation status
- Least Concern (IUCN 3.1)

Scientific classification
- Kingdom: Animalia
- Phylum: Chordata
- Class: Actinopterygii
- Order: Siluriformes
- Family: Loricariidae
- Genus: Paraloricaria
- Species: P. vetula

Binomial name
- Paraloricaria vetula (Valenciennes, 1835)

Synonyms
- Loricaria vetula Valenciennes, 1835

= Paraloricaria vetula =

Species of fish

Paraloricaria vetula is a species of freshwater ray-finned fish belonging to the family Loricariidae, the suckermouth armored catfishes, and the subfamily Loricariinae, the mailed catfishes. This catfish is found in the drainage basin of the Río de la Plata, in the Uruguay and Parańa Rivers, in Argentina Brazil and Uruguay. This species grows to a total length of 55.4 cm (21.8 in).
