= Dolichancistrus carnegiei =

Conservation status
- Least Concern (IUCN 3.1)

Scientific classification
- Kingdom: Animalia
- Phylum: Chordata
- Class: Actinopterygii
- Order: Siluriformes
- Family: Loricariidae
- Genus: Dolichancistrus
- Species: D. carnegiei

Binomial name
- Dolichancistrus carnegiei (C. H. Eigenmann, 1916)

Synonyms
- Pseudancistrus carnegiei C. H. Eigenmann, 1916; Lasiancistrus carnegiei (C. H. Eigenmann, 1916)

Species of catfish

Dolichancistrus carnegiei is a species of freshwater ray-finned fish belonging to the family Loricariidae, the suckermouth armoured catfishes, and the subfamily Hypostominae, the suckermouth catfishes. This catfish is endemic to Colombia where it is found in the eastern tributaries of the Middle Magdalena River basin, along the Cordillera Oriental in Boyacá and Santander departments. This species reaches a total length of 17 cm (6.7 in). The specific name honours the Scottish-American industrialist and philanthropist Andrew Carnegie, the founder of the Carnegie Museum and who supported and published a lot of the work of the species describer Carl H. Eigenmann.
