= Lithogenes wahari =

Conservation status
- Data Deficient (IUCN 3.1)

Scientific classification
- Kingdom: Animalia
- Phylum: Chordata
- Class: Actinopterygii
- Order: Siluriformes
- Family: Loricariidae
- Genus: Lithogenes
- Species: L. wahari

Binomial name
- Lithogenes wahari Schaefer & Provenzano, 2008

Species of armored catfish

Lithogenes wahari is a species of freshwater ray-finned fish belonging to the family Loricariidae, the suckermouth armoured catfishes. This catfish is endemic to Venezuela where it is only known from its type locality in Pawa stream, a tributary of the Cuao River, in the drainage system of the Sipapo River in Amazonas state, in the Guiana Shield. This species reaches a standard length of 7.8 cm (3.1 in). The specific name, wahari, is derived from Rúa-Wahari, the creator god of the Piaroa people who are indigenous to the middle of the Orinoco basin, within which this species is found.
