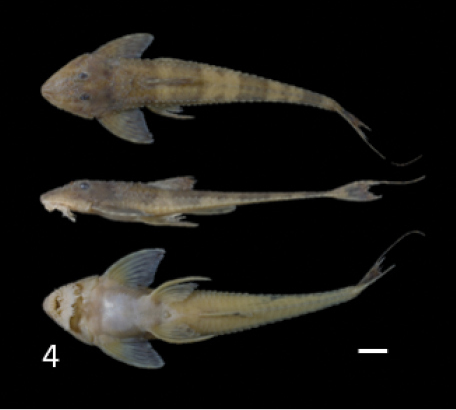

Conservation status
- Least Concern (IUCN 3.1)

Scientific classification
- Kingdom: Animalia
- Phylum: Chordata
- Class: Actinopterygii
- Order: Siluriformes
- Family: Loricariidae
- Subfamily: Loricariinae
- Genus: Proloricaria
- Species: P. prolixa

Binomial name
- Proloricaria prolixa (Isbrücker & Nijssen, 1978)

Synonyms
- Loricaria prolixa Isbrücker & Nijssen, 1978

= Proloricaria prolixa =

Genus of fishes

Proloricaria prolixa is a species of freshwater ray-finned fish belonging to the family Loricariidae, the suckermouth armored catfishes, and the subfamily Loricariinae, the mailed catfishes. This catfish is endemic to Brazil where it occurs in the upper Paraná River drainage. This species grows to a standard length of 35.0 cm (13.8 in).
