= Lithoxancistrus orinoco =

Conservation status
- Least Concern (IUCN 3.1)

Scientific classification
- Kingdom: Animalia
- Phylum: Chordata
- Class: Actinopterygii
- Order: Siluriformes
- Family: Loricariidae
- Genus: Lithoxancistrus
- Species: L. orinoco

Binomial name
- Lithoxancistrus orinoco Isbrücker, Nijssen & Cala, 1988

Synonyms
- Pseudancistrus orinoco (Isbrücker, Nijssen & Cala, 1988)

Species of catfish

Lithoxancistrus orinoco is a species of freshwater ray-finned fish belonging to the family Loricariidae, the suckermouth armoured catfishes, and the subfamily Hypostominae, the suckermouth catfishes. This catfish is found in upper Orinoco basin in Colombia and Venezuela. This species reaches a standard length of 10 cm (3.9 in).

Lithoxancistrus orinoco sometimes appears in the aquarium trade, where it is typically known either as the large-snouted pleco or by its associated L-number, which is L-126. While initially described as Lithoxancistrus orinoco (a name which is still used for the species by some sources), it was reclassified as a member of Pseudancistrus by Jonathan W. Armbruster of Auburn University in 2004, buthas since been returned to Lithoxancistrus.
