= Lithogenes valencia =

Scientific classification
- Kingdom: Animalia
- Phylum: Chordata
- Class: Actinopterygii
- Order: Siluriformes
- Family: Loricariidae
- Genus: Lithogenes
- Species: L. valencia

Binomial name
- Lithogenes valencia Provenzano, Schaefer, Baskin & Royero-Leon, 2003

Species of armored catfish

Lithogenes valencia is a species of freshwater ray-finned fish belonging to the family Loricariidae, the suckermouth armoured catfishes. This species is known only from a few type specimens collected in the 1970s, probably from the basin of the endorheic Lake Valencia in northern Venezuela. The lake had been severely impacted by pollution and abstraction, this species has not been collected since the collection of the types and it is thought that the species may be extinct.
