= Lithogenes villosus =

Conservation status
- Endangered (IUCN 3.1)

Scientific classification
- Kingdom: Animalia
- Phylum: Chordata
- Class: Actinopterygii
- Order: Siluriformes
- Family: Loricariidae
- Genus: Lithogenes
- Species: L. villosus

Binomial name
- Lithogenes villosus C. H. Eigenmann, 1909

Species of fish

Lithogenes villosus is a species of freshwater ray-finned fish belonging to the family Loricariidae, the suckermouth armoured catfishes. This species is endemic to Guyana where it is known only frorm two locations on the Potaro River, living in rapids, where it is threatened by illegal mining. This species reaches a maximum Standard length of 4.4 cm (1.7 in). This species was first formally described in 1909 by the German-born American ichthyologist Carl H. Eigenmann with its type locality given as the Upper Potaro River at Aruataima Falls in Guyana. L. villosus is the type species of the genus Lithogenes.
