= Lithoxancistrus yekuana =

Conservation status
- Data Deficient (IUCN 3.1)

Scientific classification
- Kingdom: Animalia
- Phylum: Chordata
- Class: Actinopterygii
- Order: Siluriformes
- Family: Loricariidae
- Genus: Lithoxancistrus
- Species: L. yekuana

Binomial name
- Lithoxancistrus yekuana (Lujan, Armbruster & Sabaj Pérez, 2007)

Synonyms
- Pseudancistrus yekuana Lujan, Armbruster & Sabaj Pérez, 2007

Species of catfish

Lithoxancistrus yekuana is a species of freshwater ray-finned fish belonging to the family Loricariidae, the suckermouth armoured catfishes, and the subfamily Hypostominae, the suckermouth catfishes. This catfish is endemic to Venezuela.

Lithoxancistrus yekuana was described in 2007 by Nathan K. Lujan (of the American Museum of Natural History), Mark H. Sabaj Pérez (of the Academy of Natural Sciences of Drexel University), and Jonathan W. Armbruster (of Auburn University) in the genus Pseudancistrus alongside another species, P. pectegenitor, which was later moved to the monotypic genus Colossimystax. Its specific epithet, yekuana, refers to the Ye'kuana people who inhabit parts of Venezuela and Brazil, including the upper Ventuari.

== Distribution ==
It is native to South America, where it occurs in the Ventuari River upstream of a waterfall known as Salto Tencua in the state of Amazonas in Venezuela. The species is typically found in the main channel of the Ventuari, in areas with torrential sheet flow and a substrate of bedrock. It reaches 4.3 cm (1.7 in) SL.
