= Colossimystax =

Conservation status
- Least Concern (IUCN 3.1)

Scientific classification
- Kingdom: Animalia
- Phylum: Chordata
- Class: Actinopterygii
- Order: Siluriformes
- Family: Loricariidae
- Genus: Colossimystax; Armbruster & Lujan, 2025
- Species: C. pectegenitor

Binomial name
- Colossimystax pectegenitor (Lujan, Armbruster & Sabaj Pérez, 2007)

Synonyms
- Pseudancistrus pectegenitor

Species of catfish

Colossimystax pectegenitor is a species of catfish in the family Loricariidae. It is native to South America, where it occurs in the main channel of the Orinoco near the mouth of the Ventuari River, as well as in the Casiquiare canal. The species is usually found in areas with flowing water near large rocky outcrops. It reaches 24.2 cm (9.5 in) SL. It is the only member of the monospecific genus Colossimystax, which forms a tribe with its also monotypic sister genus Stellantia.

It was described in 2007 by Nathan K. Lujan (of the American Museum of Natural History), Mark H. Sabaj Pérez (of the Academy of Natural Sciences of Drexel University), and Jonathan W. Armbruster (of Auburn University) as in the genus Pseudancistrus, along with Pseudancistrus yekuana, which was later moved to genus Lithoxancistrus.

== Etymology ==
The generic name alludes to the Greek for "enormous moustache", and its specific epithet, pectegenitor, is derived from Latin and translates to "quilled father", both alluding to the species' quilled appearance (caused by its pectoral spines, eversible cheek plates, and hypertrophied snout odontodes) and the parental care exhibited by the species, as a presumably-adult male was apparently collected while caring for a large brood of young.

C. pectegenitor occasionally appears in the aquarium trade, where it is often referred to either as the longspined stream pleco or by its associated L-number, which is L-261.
