= Dolichancistrus atratoensis =

Conservation status
- Data Deficient (IUCN 3.1)

Scientific classification
- Kingdom: Animalia
- Phylum: Chordata
- Class: Actinopterygii
- Order: Siluriformes
- Family: Loricariidae
- Genus: Dolichancistrus
- Species: D. atratoensis

Binomial name
- Dolichancistrus atratoensis (Dahl, 1960)

Synonyms
- Pseudancistrus atratoensis Dahl, 1960

Species of catfish

Dolichancistrus atratoensis is a species of freshwater ray-finned fish belonging to the family Loricariidae, the suckermouth armoured catfishes, and the subfamily Hypostominae, the suckermouth catfishes. This catfish is endemic to Colombia where it is known to occur in the Atrato and Cubarradó rivers. This catfish reaches a standard length of 8.2 cm (3.2 in). The International Union for Conservation of Nature have assessed this catfish as Data Deficient because it has a restricted range but there is very little information its population, population trends and any threats it may face.
