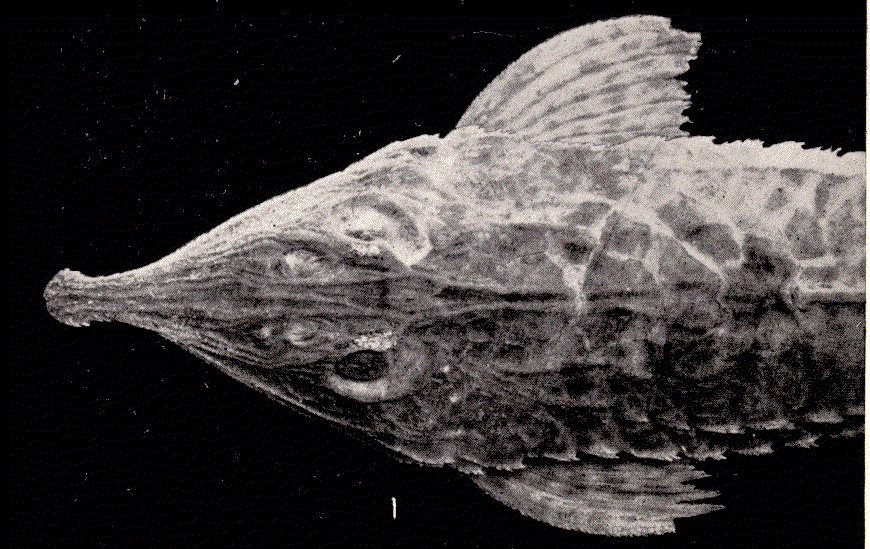

Conservation status
- Least Concern (IUCN 3.1)

Scientific classification
- Kingdom: Animalia
- Phylum: Chordata
- Class: Actinopterygii
- Order: Siluriformes
- Family: Loricariidae
- Subfamily: Loricariinae
- Genus: Hemiodontichthys; Bleeker, 1862
- Species: H. acipenserinus

Binomial name
- Hemiodontichthys acipenserinus (Kner, 1853)

Synonyms
- Hemiodon acipenserinus Kner, 1853

= Hemiodontichthys =

Genus of fishes

Hemiodontichthys is a monotypic genus of freshwater ray-finned fish belonging to the family Loricariidae, the suckermouth armored catfishes, and the subfamily Loricariinae, the mailed catfishes. The only species in this genus is Hemiodontichthys acipenserinus, also known as the Pinocchio whiptail catfish, Pinocchio catfish, Pinocchio cat or the knob-nosed whiptail. This shy, bottom-dwelling catfish is native to the Guianas, Brazil, Bolivia and Perú in South America.

== Taxonomy ==
As a taxon, Hemiodontichthys is often compared with the morphologically-similar Reganella depressa, to the point that the two have been considered sister genera (on the basis of osteological data), although the similar external morphology of the two taxa may be viewed as evolutionary convergence, as the species occupy a similar ecological niche. In both, there is a rostrum and the loss of maxillary teeth, traits which could have evolved independently in different lineages subjected to similar environmental pressures. However, having considered some of the key morphological differences between the two genera, Hemiodontichthys is now believed to be part of the Loricariichthys group, while Reganella is part of the Pseudohemiodon group. The genus Hemiodonichthys is classified in the subfamily Loricariinae in the family Loricariidae which is classified in the suborder Loricarioidei of the catfish order, Siluriformes.

== Distribution ==
H. acipenserinus is native to the countries of Bolivia, Brazil, French Guiana, Guyana and Perú, where it occurs in the Amazon, Essequibo, Oyapock, and Paraguay River basins.

== Description ==
Hemiodontichthys acipenserinus reaches a length of 13.4 centimetres (5.3 in) SL. It has been reported that populations from the Amazonian region tend to be more slender than those from the Paraguay and Guaporé Rivers.

== Ecology ==
H. acipenserinus is a reclusive bottom-dweller that spends much of its time partially buried in the substrate (similar to rays or flatfishes), with its cryptic and sandy coloration providing efficient camouflage. It lives on and in the fine-sand bottoms of rivers, where it feeds on various small, aquatic invertebrates and their larvae, including worms, brine shrimp, micro-crustaceans and other freshwater microfauna.

As with other species of the Loricariichthys group, mature male Pinocchio catfish develop hypertrophied lips for brooding eggs. They develop a huge labial veil, and grow teeth with spoon-shaped crowns; in females and juveniles, the crowns are pointed. Unlike most loricariids, Pinocchio cats do not develop prominent odontodes on the snout and pectoral fins. Eggs are laid en masse, protected by the male within the folds of his enlarged lips, ventilating his brood during times of movement. Around one week after hatching, the alevins abandon their parental protection.
