= Dolichancistrus fuesslii =

Conservation status
- Near Threatened (IUCN 3.1)

Scientific classification
- Kingdom: Animalia
- Phylum: Chordata
- Class: Actinopterygii
- Order: Siluriformes
- Family: Loricariidae
- Genus: Dolichancistrus
- Species: D. fuesslii

Binomial name
- Dolichancistrus fuesslii (Steindachner, 1911)

Synonyms
- Ancistrus fuesslii Steindachner, 1911; Lasiancistrus fuesslii (Steindachner, 1911); Pseudancistrus pediculatus C. H. Eigenmann, 1918; Dolichancistrus pediculatus (C. H. Eigenmann, 1918)

Species of catfish

Dolichancistrus fuesslii is a species of freshwater ray-finned fish belonging to the family Loricariidae, the suckermouth armoured catfishes, and the subfamily Hypostominae, the suckermouth catfishes. This catfish is found in Colombia and Venezuela where it is found in upland tributaries in the Guayabero, Meta and Arauca river basins along the eastern side of the Cordillera Oriental in the Orinoco drainage from elevations of 324 to 2,387 m (1,063 to 7,831 ft) above sea level. This species reaches a total length of 13.1 cm (5.2 in). The person honoured in the specific name, fuesslii, was not identified, but it is thought likely to be the German collector of beetles and butterflies Anton Heinrich Hermann Fassl who collected in the region of the type locality may have collected the holotype. The spelling of the name is likely to be a printer's error, Steindachner spelt the name correctly elsewhere. The International Union for Conservation of Nature have assessed D. fuesslii as Near Threatened because of ongoing threats from deforestation, agriculture, pollution and alteration of streams.
