= Dolichancistrus cobrensis =

Conservation status
- Endangered (IUCN 3.1)

Scientific classification
- Kingdom: Animalia
- Phylum: Chordata
- Class: Actinopterygii
- Order: Siluriformes
- Family: Loricariidae
- Genus: Dolichancistrus
- Species: D. cobrensis

Binomial name
- Dolichancistrus cobrensis (Schultz, 1944)

Synonyms
- Pseudancistrus pediculatus cobrensis Schultz, 1944

Species of catfish

Dolichancistrus cobrensis is a species of freshwater ray-finned fish belonging to the family Loricariidae, the suckermouth armoured catfishes, and the subfamily Hypostominae, the suckermouth catfishes. This catfish is found in Colombia and Venezuela, where it occurs in the southern tributaries of the Lake Maracaibo drainage basin. This species reaches a standard length of 7.9 cm (3.1 in). The International Union for Conservation of Nature has assessed D. cobrensis as Endangered because it has a restricted range which is subject to deforestation, urbanisation and anthropogenic climate change.
