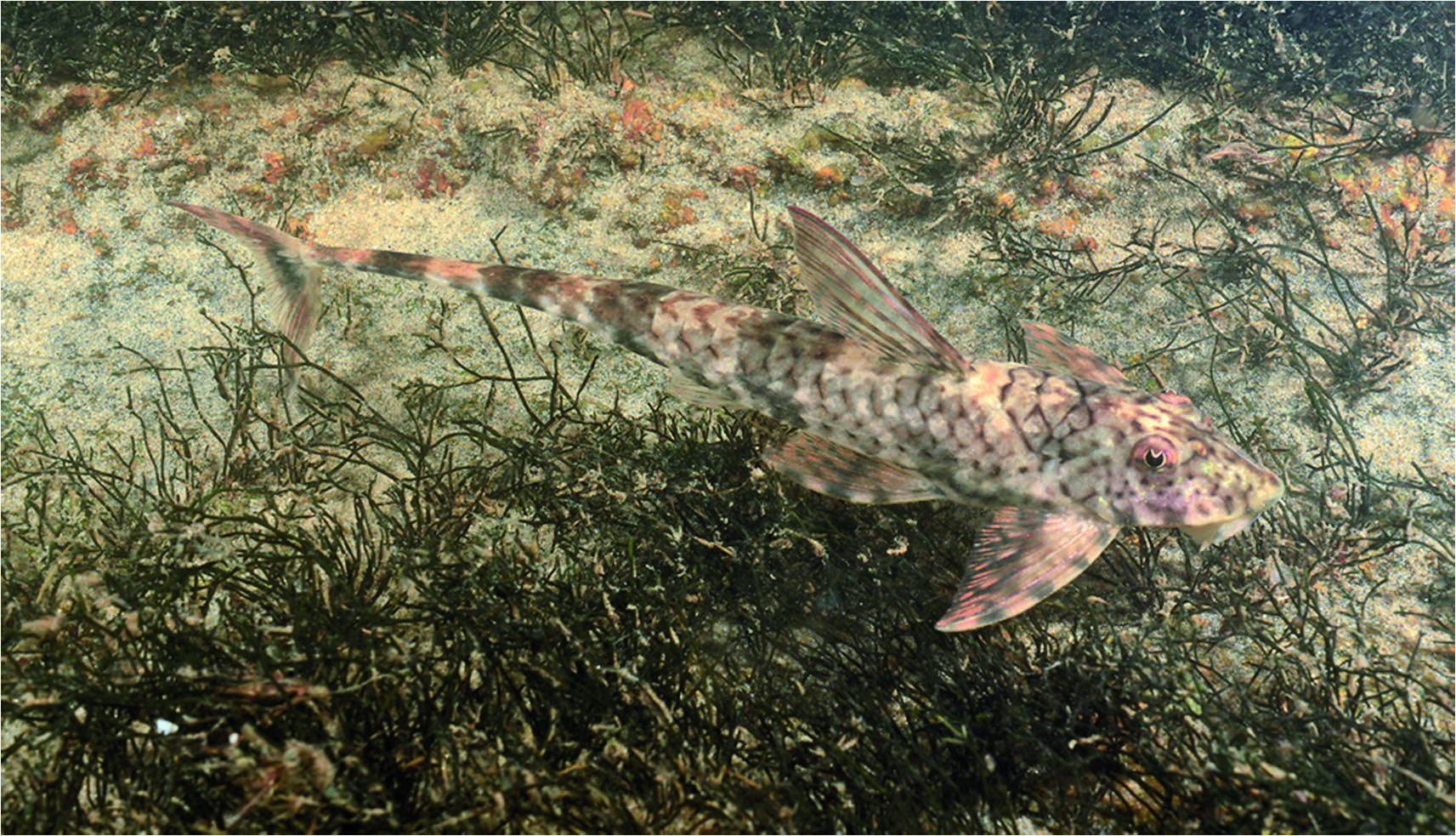
- Cteniloricaria platystoma

Scientific classification
- Kingdom: Animalia
- Phylum: Chordata
- Class: Actinopterygii
- Order: Siluriformes
- Family: Loricariidae
- Subfamily: Loricariinae
- Genus: Cteniloricaria; Isbrücker & Nijssen, 1979

Type species
- Loricaria platystoma Günther, 1868

Species
- see text

= Cteniloricaria =

Genus of fishes

Cteniloricaria is a genus of freshwater ray-finned fishes belonging to the family Loricariidae, the armored suckermouth catfishes, and the subfamily Loricariinae, the mailed catfishes. The catfishes in this genus are found in northern South America.

== Taxonomy ==
Cteniloricaria was first proposed as a genus in 1979 by the Dutch ichthyologists Isaäc J. H. Isbrücker and Han Nijssen with Loricaria platystoma designated as its type species. L. platysoma was first formally described in 1868 by Albert Günther with its type locality given as "probably Suriname". The genus is placed in the tribe Hartiini by some authorities. This genus is classified in the subfamily Loricariinae of the family Loricariidae and the suborder Loricarioidei within the catfish order, Siluriformes.

== Species ==
Cteniloricaria contains the following valid species:

- Cteniloricaria napova Covain & Fisch-Muller, 2012
- Cteniloricaria platystoma (Günther, 1868)
