= Stellantia =

Conservation status
- Least Concern (IUCN 3.1)

Scientific classification
- Kingdom: Animalia
- Phylum: Chordata
- Class: Actinopterygii
- Order: Siluriformes
- Family: Loricariidae
- Genus: Stellantia; Armbruster & Lujan, 2025
- Species: S. siderea

Binomial name
- Stellantia siderea (Armbruster, 2004)

Synonyms
- Pseudancistrus sidereus

Species of fish

Stellantia siderea is a species of armored catfish known only from the upper Orinoco basin in Amazonas state, Venezuela. It is the only member of the monospecific genus Stellantia, which forms a tribe with its also monotypic sister genus Colossimystax.

This is a fairly large loricariid (up to 17.6 centimetres (6.9 in) standard length), and is distinguished from its congeners by a strong keel on the caudal peduncle and the colour scheme which is generally very dark with bright white or yellow spots on the upperside.
