= Dolichancistrus =

Scientific classification
- Kingdom: Animalia
- Phylum: Chordata
- Class: Actinopterygii
- Order: Siluriformes
- Family: Loricariidae
- Subfamily: Hypostominae
- Genus: Dolichancistrus; Isbrücker, 1980

Type species
- Pseudancistrus pediculatus C. H. Eigenmann, 1918

Genus of fishes

Dolichancistrus is a genus of freshwater ray-finned fish belonging to the family Loricariidae, the suckermouth armoured catfishes, and the subfamily Hypostominae, the suckermouth catfishes. These catfishes are found in South America.

== Species ==
Dolichancistrus contains the following valid species:

- Dolichancistrus atratoensis (Dahl, 1960)
- Dolichancistrus carnegiei (C. H. Eigenmann, 1916)
- Dolichancistrus cobrensis (Schultz, 1944)
- Dolichancistrus fuesslii (Steindachner, 1911)
