= Dentectus =

Conservation status
- Least Concern (IUCN 3.1)

Scientific classification
- Kingdom: Animalia
- Phylum: Chordata
- Class: Actinopterygii
- Order: Siluriformes
- Family: Loricariidae
- Subfamily: Loricariinae
- Genus: Dentectus; Martín Salazar, Isbrücker, & Nijssen, 1982
- Species: D. barbarmatus

Binomial name
- Dentectus barbarmatus Martín Salazar, Isbrücker, & Nijssen, 1982

Genus of fishes

Dentectus is a monospecific genus of freshwater ray-finned fish belonging to the family Loricariidae, the armored suckermouth catfishes, and the subfamily Loricariinae, the mailed catfishes. The only species in the genus is Dentectus barbarmatus.

This species is endemic to Venezuela where it is found in the upper Orinoco drainage. There is very little ecological and behavioral information on this species.

This species reaches 13.7 centimetres (5.4 in) SL. Although it has been placed within the Pseudohemiodon group based on its strongly depressed body, filamentous lips with long fringed barbels, and small, spoon-shaped and dentition, Dentectus also shows unique derived features such as the presence of plates along the outer margin of its maxillary barbels, and a unique mouth structure that distinguishes it from all other genera.
