= Harttiella =

Scientific classification
- Kingdom: Animalia
- Phylum: Chordata
- Class: Actinopterygii
- Order: Siluriformes
- Family: Loricariidae
- Subfamily: Loricariinae
- Genus: Harttiella; Boeseman, 1971

Type species
- Harttia crassicauda Boeseman, 1953

Genus of fishes

Harttiella is a genus of freshwater ray-finned fishes belonging to the family Loricariidae, the suckermouth armored catfishes, and the subfamily Loricariinae, the mailed catfishes. The fishes in this genus are found in South America.

== Species ==
Hartiella contains the following recgnised valid species:

- Harttiella crassicauda (Boeseman, 1953)
- Harttiella intermedia Covain & Fisch-Muller, 2012
- Harttiella janmoli Covain & Fisch-Muller, 2012
- Harttiella longicauda Covain & Fisch-Muller, 2012
- Harttiella lucifer Covain & Fisch-Muller, 2012
- Harttiella parva Covain & Fisch-Muller, 2012
- Harttiella pilosa Covain & Fisch-Muller, 2012
