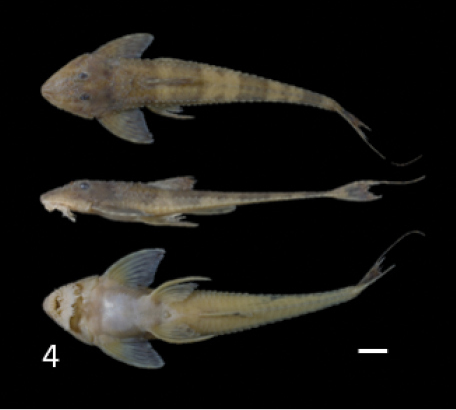
- Proloricaria prolixa

Scientific classification
- Kingdom: Animalia
- Phylum: Chordata
- Class: Actinopterygii
- Order: Siluriformes
- Family: Loricariidae
- Subfamily: Loricariinae
- Genus: Proloricaria; Isbrücker, 2001

Type species
- Proloricaria prolixa (Isbrücker & Nijssen, 1978)

= Proloricaria =

Genus of fishes

Proloricaria is a genus of freshwater ray-finned fishes belonging to the family Loricariidae, the suckermouth armored catfishes, and the subfamily Loricariinae, the mailed catfishes. The catfishes in this genus are found in South America with both species being found in the upper Paraná River basin.

== Species ==
Proloricaria contains the following recognised species:

- Proloricaria lentiginosa (Isbrücker, 1979)
- Proloricaria prolixa (Isbrücker & Nijssen, 1978)
