= Furcodontichthys =

Conservation status
- Least Concern (IUCN 3.1)

Scientific classification
- Kingdom: Animalia
- Phylum: Chordata
- Class: Actinopterygii
- Order: Siluriformes
- Family: Loricariidae
- Subfamily: Loricariinae
- Genus: Furcodontichthys; Rapp Py-Daniel, 1981
- Species: F. novaesi

Binomial name
- Furcodontichthys novaesi Rapp Py-Daniel, 1981

Species of fish

Furcodontichthys is a monospecific genus of freshwater ray-finned fish is a species of freshwater ray-finned fish belonging to the family Loricariidae, the suckermouth armored catfishes, and the subfamily Loricariinae, the mailed catfishes. The only species in the genus is Furcodontichthys novaesi.

This species is endemic to Brazil where it is known from the middle Amazon at Lake Tefé and from the upper Juruá River drainage in the Solimões River basin. F. novaesi inhabits sandy substrates.

Furcodontichthys novaesi reaches a length of 10.2 centimetres (4.0 in) SL. As with closely related genera, males of Furcodontichthys show a hypertrophied development of the lips suggesting that this genus is a lip brooder. The presence of conspicuous fringed barbels at the lip corners is unique among the Loricariinae subfamily.
