= Planiloricaria =

Conservation status
- Least Concern (IUCN 3.1)

Scientific classification
- Kingdom: Animalia
- Phylum: Chordata
- Class: Actinopterygii
- Order: Siluriformes
- Family: Loricariidae
- Subfamily: Loricariinae
- Genus: Planiloricaria; Isbrücker, 1971
- Species: P. cryptodon

Binomial name
- Planiloricaria cryptodon (Isbrücker, 1971)

Synonyms
- Pseudohemiodon cryptodon Isbrücker, 1971

Genus of fishes

Planiloricaria is a monospecific genus of freshwater ray-finned fish belonging to the family Loricariidae, the suckermouth armored catfishes, and the subfamily Loricariinae, the mailed catfishes. The only species in the genus is Planiloricaria cryptodon.

This species is native to Bolivia, Brazil and Peru where it occurs in the upper Amazon basin, including the Ucayali, Purus, and Mamoré River drainages. P. cryptodon inhabits sandy substrates in the main streams of large rivers.

Planiloricaria cryptodon reaches a length of 21.5 centimetres (8.5 in) SL. Although reproductive habits are unknown, this species is probably a lip brooder. Sexual dimorphism is characterized by the shape of the genital area; the genital area in males is elongate and narrow compared with the large and roundish area of females. This species shows derived features such as a reduction in size and number of teeth, premaxillary teeth absent, a circular head shape, and eyes reduced in size without iris operculum.
