= Pterosturisoma =

Scientific classification
- Kingdom: Animalia
- Phylum: Chordata
- Class: Actinopterygii
- Order: Siluriformes
- Family: Loricariidae
- Subfamily: Loricariinae
- Genus: Pterosturisoma; Isbrücker & Nijssen, 1978
- Species: P. microps

Binomial name
- Pterosturisoma microps (C. H. Eigenmann & W. R. Allen, 1942)

Synonyms
- Harttia microps C. H. Eigenmann & W. R. Allen, 1942

Genus of fishes

Pterosturisoma is a monospecific genus of freshwater ray-finned fish belonging to the family Loricariidae, the suckermouth armored catfishes, and the subfamily Loricariinae, the mailed catfishes.. The only species in the genus is Pterosturisoma microps.

This species is endemic to Peru where it is found in the upper Amazon basin. P. microps is a rheophile, which means it likes fast-moving water.

Pterosturisoma microps reaches a length of 16.1 centimetres (6.3 in) SL. Pterosturisoma appears morphologically very similar to Lamontichthys; however, Pterosturisoma has 6 pectoral fin rays while Lamontichthys has 7. These two genera share features with Sturisoma such as similar body depth at the dorsal fin origin, the presence of filamentous extensions on caudal fin spines, and complete abdominal plate cover that extends to the lower lip margin. The sexes of P. microps can be distinguished by the width of a naked trapezoidal area framed by four bony plates in the genital region; this area appeared broader in females, and longer and narrower in males.
