= Limatulichthys griseus =

Conservation status
- Least Concern (IUCN 3.1)

Scientific classification
- Kingdom: Animalia
- Phylum: Chordata
- Class: Actinopterygii
- Order: Siluriformes
- Family: Loricariidae
- Genus: Limatulichthys
- Species: L. griseus

Binomial name
- Limatulichthys griseus (C. H. Eigenmann, 1909)

Synonyms
- Loricaria griseus C. H. Eigenmann, 1909; Loricariichthys parnahybae Fowler, 1941

Species of fish

Limatulichthys griseus is a species of freshwater ray-finned fish belonging to the family Loricariidae, the suckermouth armored catfishes, and the subfamily Loricariinae, the mailed catfishes. This catfish is found in South America.

This species is native to Brazil, Colombia, Ecuador, Guyana and Peru where it is widely distributed being recorded from the Amazon, Solimões, Branco, Tocantins, Xingu, Araguaia, Ucayali, Essequibo, Orinoco and Paraíba do Norte river basins. L. griseus is a sand dweller.

L. griseus reaches a standard length of 23.7 cm (9.3 in). As with closely related genera, males show a hypertrophied development of the lips suggesting that this species is a lip brooder.
