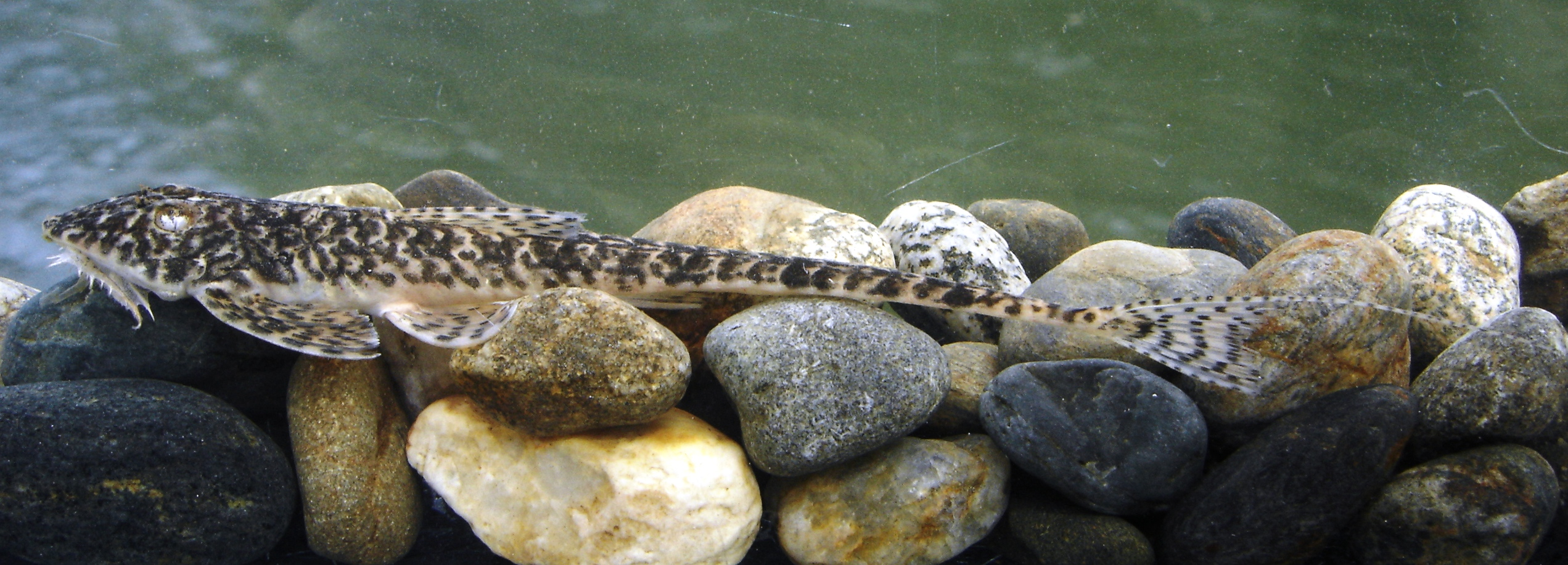
- Crossoloricaria variegata

Scientific classification
- Kingdom: Animalia
- Phylum: Chordata
- Class: Actinopterygii
- Order: Siluriformes
- Family: Loricariidae
- Subfamily: Loricariinae
- Genus: Crossoloricaria; Isbrücker, 1979

Type species
- Loricaria variegata Steindachner, 1879

= Crossoloricaria =

Genus of fishes

Crossoloricaria is a genus of freshwater ray-finned fishes belonging to the family Loricariidae, the armored suckermouth catfishes, and the subfamily Loricariinae, the mailed catfishes. The catfishes in this genus are found in South and Central America.

== Taxonomy ==
Crossloricaria is classified, by some authorities, in the Pseudohemiodon group in the tribe Loricariini of the subfamily Loricariinae. This genus is poorly diagnosed and is in need of revision. Its only diagnostic character (incomplete abdominal cover consisting of a double median row of plates) is shared by two other representatives of the Pseudohemiodon group, Apistoloricaria and Rhadinoloricaria. Crossoloricaria also has some traits such as lip structure and barbel length that place it closer to Pseudohemiodon.

== Species ==
There are currently three recognized species in this genus:

- Crossoloricaria cephalaspis Isbrücker, 1979
- Crossoloricaria variegata (Steindachner, 1879)
- Crossoloricaria venezuelae (L. P. Schultz, 1944)

== Distribution and habitat ==
The species of Crossoloricaria are distributed in the northwestern part of South America along the Pacific slope (in Panama and Colombia), Lake Maracaibo region (Venezuela), and the upper Amazon system (Peru). Crossoloricaria species occur over sandy substrates of larger rivers and their tributaries.
