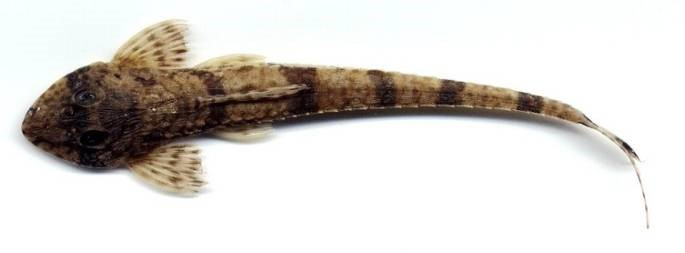

Scientific classification
- Kingdom: Animalia
- Phylum: Chordata
- Class: Actinopterygii
- Division: Teleostei
- Order: Siluriformes
- Family: Loricariidae
- Subfamily: Loricariinae
- Genus: Dasyloricaria; Isbrücker & Nijssen, 1979

Type species
- Loricaria filamentosa Steindachner, 1878

= Dasyloricaria =

Genus of fishes

Dasyloricaria is a genus of freshwater ray-finned fishes belonging to the family Loricariidae, the armored suckermouth catfishes, and the subfamily Loricariinae, the mailed catfishes. The catfishes in this genus are found in Central and South America. The distribution of these species includes the northwestern South America on the Pacific slope of Colombia and Panama. Its distribution is restricted to the Pacific slope of the Andes, which is a unique pattern of distribution within the subfamily.

== Species ==
Dasyloricaria contains the following valid species:

- Dasyloricaria filamentosa (Steindachner, 1878)
- Dasyloricaria latiura (C. H. Eigenmann & Vance, 1912)
- Dasyloricaria paucisquama Londoño-Burbano & R. E. dos Reis, 2016

== Description ==
Sexual dimorphism is similar to that of the Rineloricaria group, including hypertrophied odontodes forming brushes on the lateral surfaces of the head in mature males and papillose lips. However, it is also morphologically similar to members of the Loricariichthys group. It shares deep postorbital notches, an abdominal cover strongly structured, and a similar mouth shape; hypertrophied development of the lower lip has also been reported, a characteristic of representatives of the Loricariichthys group, suggesting that Dasyloricaria is also a lip brooder. Finally, with some representatives of the Loricaria group, it shares a triangular head, strong predorsal keels, and the upper caudal fin ray produced into a long whip. Dasyloricaria could represent a link between all other morphological groups.
