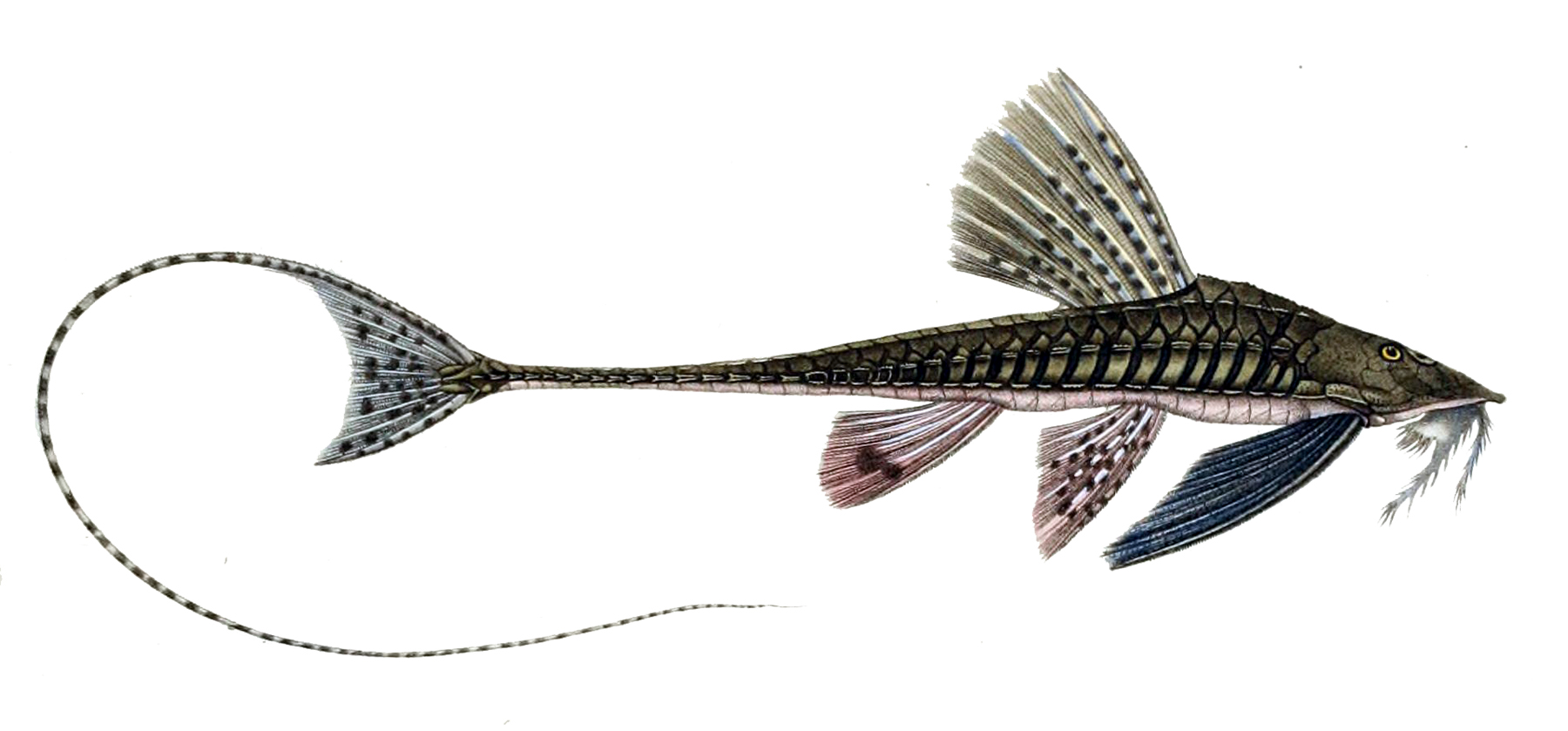

Scientific classification
- Kingdom: Animalia
- Phylum: Chordata
- Class: Actinopterygii
- Division: Teleostei
- Order: Siluriformes
- Family: Loricariidae
- Subfamily: Loricariinae
- Genus: Paraloricaria; Isbrücker, 1979

Type species
- Loricaria vetula Valenciennes, 1836

= Paraloricaria =

Genus of fishes

Paraloricaria is a genus of freshwater ray-finned fishes belonging to the family Loricariidae, the suckermouth armored catfishes, and the subfamily Loricariinae, the mailed catfishes. The catfishes in this genus are found in South America.

== Species ==
Paraloricaria contains the following recognized species:

- Paraloricaria agastor Isbrücker, 1979
- Paraloricaria commersonoides (Devincenzi, 1943)
- Paraloricaria vetula (Valenciennes, 1835)

== Description ==
Paraloricaria shows a strongly flattened body, weak postorbital notches, long and ramified maxillary barbels, and overall, conspicuous fringed barbels.

Male Paraloricaria are abdomino-lip brooders.
