= Pyxiloricaria =

Conservation status
- Least Concern (IUCN 3.1)

Scientific classification
- Kingdom: Animalia
- Phylum: Chordata
- Class: Actinopterygii
- Order: Siluriformes
- Family: Loricariidae
- Subfamily: Loricariinae
- Genus: Pyxiloricaria; Isbrücker & Nijssen, 1984
- Species: P. menezesi

Binomial name
- Pyxiloricaria menezesi Isbrücker & Nijssen, 1984

Genus of fishes

Pyxiloricaria, is a monospecific genus of freshwater ray-finned fish belonging to the family Loricariidae, the suckermouth armored catfishes, and the subfamily Loricariinae, the mailed catfishes. The only species in the genus is Pyxiloricaria menezesi.

This species is endemic to Brazil where it occurs in the Paraguay River drainage. P. menezesi inhabits sandy substrates and is sympatric with representatives of the genus Pseudohemiodon.

Pyxiloricaria menezesi reaches a length of 14.0 centimetres (5.5 in) SL. The phylogenetic position is uncertain; although it is thought to be closely related to Pseudohemiodon, it shares with Loricaria filamentous lips, inconspicuous fringed barbels on the lower lip, and shorter maxillary barbels.
