= Cheilonimata =

Scientific classification
- Kingdom: Animalia
- Phylum: Chordata
- Class: Actinopterygii
- Order: Siluriformes
- Family: Loricariidae
- Subfamily: Loricariinae
- Genus: Cheilonimata; Provenzano, 2023

Type species
- Cheilonimata minuta Provenzano, 2023

Genus of fishes

Cheilonimata is a genus of freshwater ray-finned fishes belonging to the family Loricariidae, the armored suckermouth catfishes, and the subfamily Loricariinae, the mailed catfishes. The fishes in this genus are found in South America in Brazil and Venezuela.

== Species ==
There are currently two recognized species in this genus:

- Cheilonimata minuta Provenzano, 2023
- Cheilonimata papillosa (Crispim-Rodrigues, Bernt, Waltz, Silva, Benine, Oliveira, Covain & Roxo, 2023)
