= Limatulichthys =

Scientific classification
- Kingdom: Animalia
- Phylum: Chordata
- Class: Actinopterygii
- Order: Siluriformes
- Family: Loricariidae
- Subfamily: Loricariinae
- Genus: Limatulichthys; Isbrücker & Nijssen, 1979

Type species
- Loricaria punctata Regan, 1904

Genus of fishes

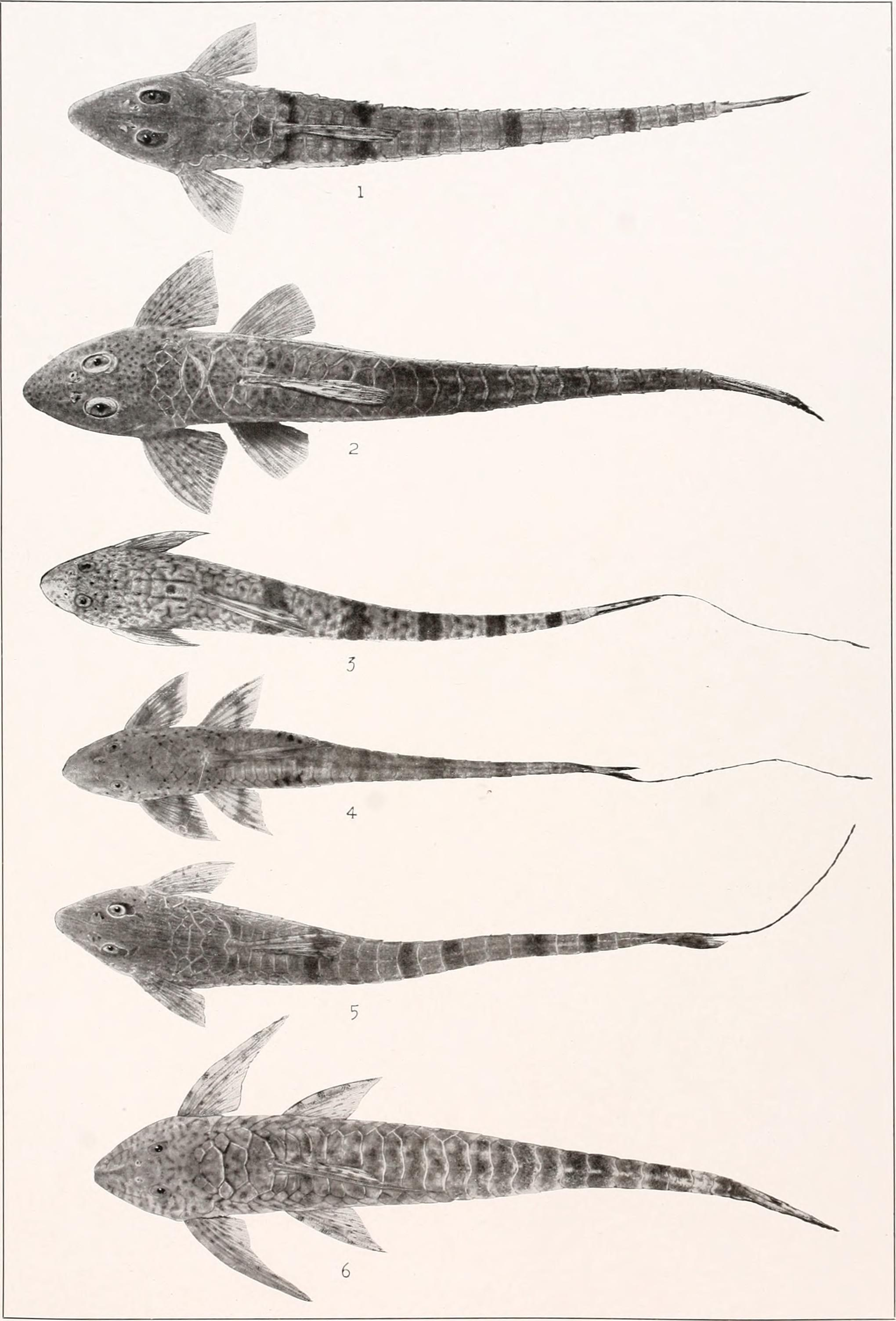
1. Loricariichthys microdon, 2. Limatulichthys griseus syn. Loricaria griseus syn. Loricariichthys griseus, 3. Loricariichthys brunneus, 4. Loricariichthys platyurus, 5. Loricariichthys stewarti, 6. Cteniloricaria platystoma syn. Harttia platystoma

Limatulichthys is a genus of freshwater ray-finned fishes belonging to the family Loricariidae, the suckermouth armored catfishes, and the subfamily Loricariinae, the mailed catfishes. The catfishes in this genus are found in South America.

== Species ==
There are currently 3 recognized species in this genus:

- Limatulichthys griseus C. H. Eigenmann, 1909
- Limatulichthys nasarcus Londoño-Burbano, Lefebvre & Lujan, 2014
- Limatulichthys petleyi (Fowler, 1940)
