= Ricola macrops =

Conservation status
- Least Concern (IUCN 3.1)

Scientific classification
- Kingdom: Animalia
- Phylum: Chordata
- Class: Actinopterygii
- Order: Siluriformes
- Family: Loricariidae
- Subfamily: Loricariinae
- Genus: Ricola; Isbrücker & Nijssen, 1974
- Species: R. macrops

Binomial name
- Ricola macrops (Regan, 1904)

Synonyms
- Loricaria macrops Regan, 1904

Species of fish

Ricola macrops is a species of freshwater ray-finned fish belonging to the family Loricariidae, the suckermouth armored catfishes, and the subfamily Loricariinae, the mailed catfishes. It is the only species in the monospecific genus Ricola.

Ecological and behavioral data are unavailable for this species. This species is native to Argentina and Uruguay where it occurs in the lower Paraná River basin. R. macrops probably inhabits sandy substrates with flowing waters. R. macrops reaches a length of 21.0 centimetres (8.3 in) SL.

It shares features with representatives of different groups within Loricariini. For example, it possesses conspicuous fringed barbels on the lower lip, a feature shared by the representatives of the Pseudohemiodon group. It also bears numerous papillae on the inner surfaces of the lips and numerous straight bicuspid teeth that are characteristic of the Rineloricaria group.
