= Fonchiiloricaria =

Conservation status
- Least Concern (IUCN 3.1)

Scientific classification
- Kingdom: Animalia
- Phylum: Chordata
- Class: Actinopterygii
- Order: Siluriformes
- Family: Loricariidae
- Subfamily: Loricariinae
- Genus: Fonchiiloricaria; Rodriguez, Ortega & Covain, 2011
- Species: F. nanodon

Binomial name
- Fonchiiloricaria nanodon Rodriguez, Ortega & Covain, 2011

Genus of fishes

Fonchiiloricaria is a monospecific genus of freshwater ray-finned fish is a species of freshwater ray-finned fish belonging to the family Loricariidae, the suckermouth armored catfishes, and the subfamily Loricariinae, the mailed catfishes. The only species in this genus is Fonchiiloricaria nanodon, a catfish which is known only from the middle Huallaga River drainage, near Tingo Maria in Peru.

The generic name Fonchiiloricaria honours the Peruvian ichthyologist Fonchii Chang, who collected the holotype, and the specific name νᾶνος "nā́nos", meaning dwarf or reduced and ὀδούς "odoús", meaning tooth.
