= Pseudoloricaria =

Conservation status
- Least Concern (IUCN 3.1)

Scientific classification
- Kingdom: Animalia
- Phylum: Chordata
- Class: Actinopterygii
- Order: Siluriformes
- Family: Loricariidae
- Subfamily: Loricariinae
- Genus: Pseudoloricaria; Bleeker, 1862
- Species: P. laeviuscula

Binomial name
- Pseudoloricaria laeviuscula (Valenciennes, 1840)

Synonyms
- Loricaria laeviuscula Valenciennes, 1840

Genus of fishes

Pseudoloricaria is a monospecific genus of freshwater ray-finned fish belonging to the family Loricariidae, the suckermouth armored catfishes, and the subfamily Loricariinae, the mailed catfishes. The only species in the genus is Pseudoloricaria laeviuscula, Valenciennes' whiptail catfish. The phylogenetic position of Pseudoloricaria is uncertain.

This species is endemic to Brazil where it is found in the middle and lower Amazon basin, including the Negro and Branco Rivers. P. laeviuscula is found over sandy bottoms, in clear waters, in the main flow of rivers, and in neighboring temporary ponds.

Pseudoloricaria laeviuscula reaches a length of 30.5 centimetres (12.0 in) SL. Although reproductive habits are unknown, this species is probably a lip brooder. Sexual dimorphism includes hypertrophied development of the lower lip suggesting that P. laeviuscula is a lip brooder. This species shows derived features such as a reduction in size and number of teeth, premaxillary teeth absent, a circular head shape, and eyes reduced in size without iris operculum.
