= Nannoplecostomus =

Conservation status
- Least Concern (IUCN 3.1)

Scientific classification
- Kingdom: Animalia
- Phylum: Chordata
- Class: Actinopterygii
- Order: Siluriformes
- Family: Loricariidae
- Genus: Nannoplecostomus; A. C. Ribeiro, F. C. T. Lima & E. H. L. Pereira, 2012
- Species: N. eleonorae

Binomial name
- Nannoplecostomus eleonorae A. C. Ribeiro, F. C. T. Lima & E. H. L. Pereira, 2012

Species of fish

Nannoplecostomus eleonorae is a species of armored catfish known only from the upper Rio Tocantins basin in the Brazilian state of Goiás. This species grows to a length of 2.22 centimetres (0.87 in) SL. This species is the only known member of its genus and the smallest loricariid catfish known.

The fish was named in honor of Brazilian biospeleologist Eleonora Trajano, for her contributions to the knowledge of the diversity of Brazilian troglobitic fishes, including the fishes of the karst area of São Domingos, where this catfish is found.
