= Metaloricaria =

Scientific classification
- Kingdom: Animalia
- Phylum: Chordata
- Class: Actinopterygii
- Division: Teleostei
- Order: Siluriformes
- Family: Loricariidae
- Subfamily: Loricariinae
- Genus: Metaloricaria; Isbrücker, 1975

Type species
- Metaloricaria paucidens Isbrücker, 1975

Genus of fishes

Metaloricaria is a genus of freshwater ray-finned fishes belonging to the family Loricariidae, the suckermouth armored catfishes, and the subfamily Loricariinae, the mailed catfishes. The catfishes in this genus are found in South America.

== Taxonomy ==
Metaloricaria was first proposed as a monospecific genus in 1975 by the Dutch ichthyologist Isaäc J. H. Isbrücker when a described M. paucidens, which he also designated as its type species. The phylogenetic position of Metaloricaria remains uncertain. Some authors classify this genus in the tribe Harttiini in the subfamily Loricariinae, the length of the maxillary barbels (longer than in all other Harttiini), low number of teeth and their reduced size, reduction of the number of caudal-fin rays, and sexual dimorphism reminiscent of that seen in the Rineloricaria group, tend to support a closer relationship of Metaloricaria with the tribe Loricariini. The Loricariinae is a subfamily of the Loricariidae, which is the type family of the suborder Loricarioidei within the order Siluriformes, the catfishes.

== Species ==
There are currently two recognized species in this genus:

- Metaloricaria nijsseni (Boeseman, 1976)
- Metaloricaria paucidens Isbrücker, 1975

== Distribution and habitat ==
Metaloricaria is only known from the Guiana Shield in French Guiana and Suriname where the species occupy an ecological niche similar to that of Harttia. The species are rarely found in their natural environment and inhabit primarily streams over rocky and sandy substrates.

== Description ==
Sexual dimorphism includes hypertrophied development of odontodes arranged in brushes along the sides of the head and on the spine and rays of the pectoral fins in mature males. Females also possess such brushes along the sides of the head, but do not seem to develop pectoral-fin enlarged odontodes.
