= Brochiloricaria =

Scientific classification
- Kingdom: Animalia
- Phylum: Chordata
- Class: Actinopterygii
- Order: Siluriformes
- Family: Loricariidae
- Subfamily: Loricariinae
- Genus: Brochiloricaria; Isbrücker & Nijssen, 1979

Type species
- Brochiloricaria chauliodon Isbrücker, 1979

species
- see text

Genus of fishes

Brochiloricaria is a genus of freshwater ray-finned fishes belonging to the family Loricariidae, the armored suckermouth catfishes, and the subfamily Loricariinae, the mailed catfishes. The fishes in this genus are found in South America.

== Species ==
There are currently two recognized species in this genus:

- Brochiloricaria chauliodon Isbrücker, 1979 (Orchid leather neck whiptail)
- Brochiloricaria macrodon (Kner, 1853)

== Appearance and anatomy ==
Brochiloricaria is morphologically very similar to Loricaria and can be distinguished from the latter only by its teeth characteristics; in Brochiloricaria, the teeth are very long and of equal size on both jaws, while in Loricaria the premaxillary teeth are almost two times longer than dentary teeth. However, dentition may not be a reliable characteristic to differentiate to genera, so Brochiloricaria may actually be a synonym of Loricaria.

Both species of Brochiloricaria reach almost 30 centimetres (12 in) in length.

== Ecology ==
Brochiloricaria is an abdomino-lip brooder.
