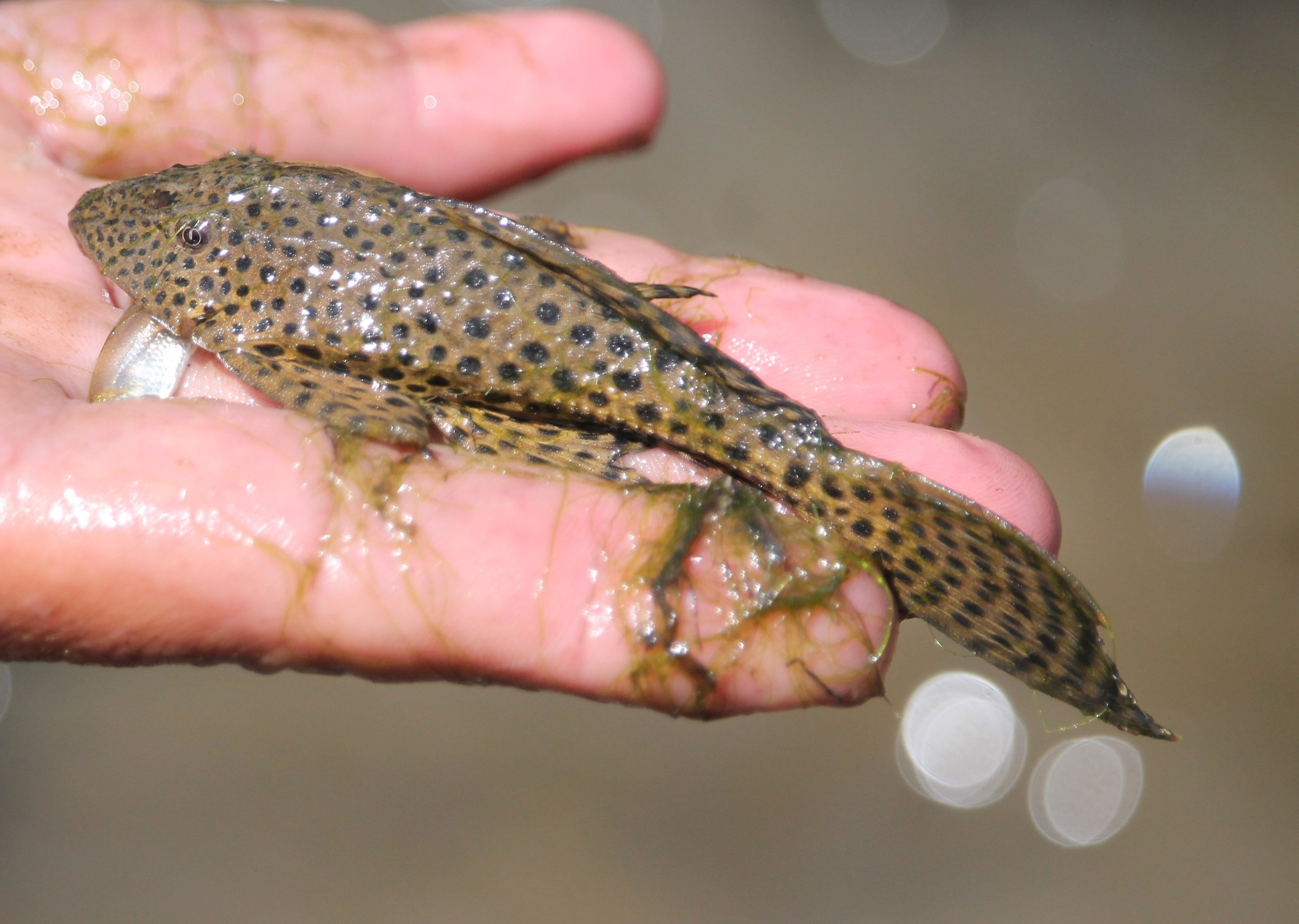

Conservation status
- Least Concern (IUCN 3.1)

Scientific classification
- Kingdom: Animalia
- Phylum: Chordata
- Class: Actinopterygii
- Division: Teleostei
- Order: Siluriformes
- Family: Loricariidae
- Genus: Pterygoplichthys
- Species: P. punctatus

Binomial name
- Pterygoplichthys punctatus (Kner, 1854)

Synonyms
- Glyptoperichthys punctatus Kner 1854; Loricaria punctata Kner 1854

= Pterygoplichthys punctatus =

Species of catfish

Pterygoplichthys punctatus, commonly known as the corroncho, is a species of catfish in the family Loricariidae. It is a freshwater fish native to South America, where it occurs in the basins of the Juruá River, Madeira River, the Marañón River, and the Purus River in Bolivia, Brazil, Ecuador, and Peru. The species reaches 28.5 cm (11.2 in) in standard length and is known to be a facultative air-breather.

Pterygoplichthys punctatus appears in the aquarium trade, where it may be referred to as the imperial ranger pleco, the Guimares silver pleco, the Trinidad pleco, or the yogi pleco.
