= Lithoxancistrus =

Scientific classification
- Kingdom: Animalia
- Phylum: Chordata
- Class: Actinopterygii
- Order: Siluriformes
- Family: Loricariidae
- Subfamily: Hypostominae
- Genus: Lithoxancistrus; Isbrücker, Nijssen & Cala, 1988

Type species
- Lithoxancistrus orinoco Isbrücker, Nijssen & Cala, 1988

Genus of fishes

Lithoxancistrus is a genus of freshwater ray-finned fish belonging to the family Loricariidae, the suckermouth armoured catfishes, and the subfamily Hypostominae, the suckermouth catfishes. The catfishes in this genus are found in South America.

== Species ==
There are currently two recognized species in this genus:

- Lithoxancistrus orinoco Isbrücker, Nijssen & Cala, 1988
- Lithoxancistrus yekuana (Lujan, Armbruster & Sabaj Pérez, 2007)

== Taxonomy ==
Lithoxancistrus was erected in 1988, but was later synonymized with Pseudancistrus. It was revalidated as a genus in 2012. Some authorities regard this genus as being within the tribe Ancistrini of the subfamily Hypostominae, but Eschmeyer's Catalog of Fishes does not recognise tribes within the subfamily Hypostominae.
