= Lithogenes =

Scientific classification
- Kingdom: Animalia
- Phylum: Chordata
- Class: Actinopterygii
- Order: Siluriformes
- Family: Loricariidae
- Subfamily: Lithogeninae; Gosline, 1947
- Genus: Lithogenes; C. H. Eigenmann, 1909

Type species
- Lithogenes villosus C. H. Eigenmann, 1909

Genus of fishes

Lithogenes is a genus of freshwater ray-finned fishes belonging to the family Loricariidae, the suckermouth armoured catfishes. It is the only genus within the subfamily Lithogeninae. The fishes in this genus are found in northern South America.

== Taxonomy ==
Lithogenes is the only genus within the subfamily Lithogeninae. This genus and subfamily, the most basal group in Loricariidae, is the sister group to the rest of the family. Relative to an undescribed species of Lithogeninae, L. valencia has sister group relationship to L. villosus.

== Species ==
The three recognized species in this genus are:

- Lithogenes valencia Provenzano, Schaefer, Baskin & Royero-Leon, 2003
- Lithogenes villosus C. H. Eigenmann, 1909
- Lithogenes wahari Schaefer & Provenzano, 2008

== Appearance and anatomy ==
As members of the family Loricariidae, all Lithogenes species have a suckermouth. However, unlike most loricariids, species of the genus Lithogenes possess armor plating only on the latter half of the body. Their eyes are small and their bodies flattened.

== Distribution and habitat ==
L. villosus originates from the Essequibo River drainage of the Guiana Shield. An undescribed species of Lithogenes is known from the Orinoco basin of the Guiana Shield. L. valencia has only been known from six specimens collected in the 1970s from tributaries of the Lake Valencia in northern Venezuela; however, this area has since been polluted and this species possibly is now extinct.

L. villosus lives in habitats dominated by rapids over bedrock, and L. valencia likely does, as well.
