= Microplecostomus =

Conservation status
- Data Deficient (IUCN 3.1)

Scientific classification
- Kingdom: Animalia
- Phylum: Chordata
- Class: Actinopterygii
- Order: Siluriformes
- Family: Loricariidae
- Genus: Microplecostomus; G. S. C. Silva, Roxo, L. E. Ochoa & de Oliveira, 2016
- Species: M. forestii

Binomial name
- Microplecostomus forestii G. S. C. Silva, Roxo, L. E. Ochoa & Oliveira, 2016

Genus of fishes

Microplecostomus forestii, is a species of fish in the family Loricariidae found in two tributaries of the Tocantizinho River in the Tocantins basin. It is typically found in shallow, clear waters at depths of around 50 cm (20 in), in flat rocky environments. It is known to occur alongside the species Rhinolekos capetinga, as well as members of the genera Ancistrus, Creagrutus, Hypostomus, Ituglanis, and Phenacorhamdia. This species is the only member of its genus. It reaches 3.8 cm (1.5 in) in standard length.

The fish is named in honor of Fausto Foresti of the Universidade Estadual Paulista "Júlio de Mesquita Filho"-UNESP, Brazil, because of his contributions to fish genetics, with more than 250 papers published in this field.
