= Reganella =

Conservation status
- Least Concern (IUCN 3.1)

Scientific classification
- Kingdom: Animalia
- Phylum: Chordata
- Class: Actinopterygii
- Order: Siluriformes
- Family: Loricariidae
- Subfamily: Loricariinae
- Genus: Reganella; C. H. Eigenmann, 1905
- Species: R. depressa

Binomial name
- Reganella depressa (Kner, 1853)

Synonyms
- Hemiodon depressus Kner, 1853

Genus of fishes

Reganella is a monospecific genus of freshwater ray-finned fish belonging to the family Loricariidae, the suckermouth armored catfishes, and the subfamily Loricariinae, the mailed catfishes. The only species in this genus is Reganella depressa. R. depressa is a poorly known species and uncommon in collections. Its phylogenetic position remains uncertain.

This species is endemic to Brazil where it occurs in the middle Amazon basin, including the Negro, Tapajos, and Branco Rivers. R. depressa probably inhabits sandy substrates with flowing waters. R. depressa reaches a length of 11.3 centimetres (4.4 in) SL.
