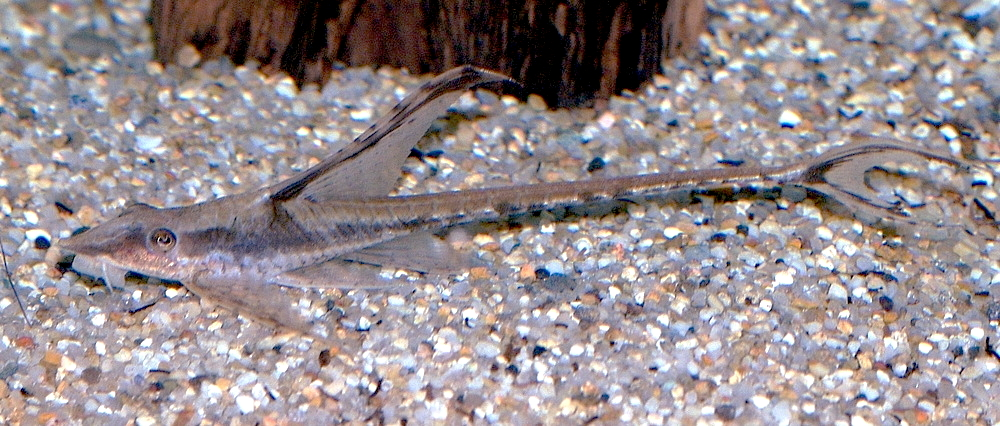
- Sturisomatichthys panamensis

Scientific classification
- Kingdom: Animalia
- Phylum: Chordata
- Class: Actinopterygii
- Order: Siluriformes
- Family: Loricariidae
- Subfamily: Loricariinae; Bonaparte, 1831

Type genus
- Loricaria Linnaeus, 1758

Genera
- see text

= Loricariinae =

Subfamily of fishes

Loricariinae is a subfamily of freshwater ray-finned fishes belonging to the family Loricariidae, the armored suckermouth catfishes. This subfamily is divided into two tribes and about 30 genera. They are mainly native to freshwater habitats in South America, but there are also several species (in genera Crossoloricaria, Dasyloricaria, Rineloricaria, Spatuloricaria, Sturisoma and Sturisomatichthys) in Panama and a single (Rineloricaria) in Costa Rica.

== Taxonomy ==
Loricariinae was first proposed in 1831 by Charles Lucien Bonaparte. Later, in 1979, many genera were described and Loricariinae was divided into four tribes by some authorities: Loricariini, Harttiini, Farlowellini, and Acestridiini. Eventually, the genera of Acestridiini was included under Hypoptopomatinae and genera of Farlowellini was reclassified into Hartiini. This subfamily has been found to be monophyletic. The most recent papers conclude that there are 30 or 31 genera; the status of Cteniloricaria is dubious; although recognized as a synonym of Harttia by some, this conclusion was reached without diagnosing the type species of Cteniloricaria. Loricariinae is the type subfamily of the family Loricariidae and the suborder Loricarioidei within the catfish order, Siluriformes.

== Description ==
As loricariids, loricariinae species are characterized by a depressed body covered by bony plates, a unique pair of maxillary barbels, and modification of the mouth into a suckermouth. Members of the subfamily Loricariinae show a greater diversity of lip structures and shapes than other loricariids. Loricariines are characterized by a long and depressed caudal peduncle (rectangular cross-section) and by the absence of an adipose fin. They also show dramatic variation in body shape, lip morphology and dentition. The sexual dimorphism is often pronounced and is expressed through the hypertrophy of odontodes on the pectoral fin rays, on the snout margin, and sometimes on the predorsal area of mature males. Certain genera also show sexual differences in lip and tooth structures.

The Harttiini are characterized by numerous and pedunculated teeth, a caudal fin with more branched rays, the absence of postorbital notches and predorsal keels, a rounded mouth, papillose lips weakly or not fringed, and short maxillary barbels. The Loricariini are characterized by a more important variation in lips and teeth shape, the frequent presence of postorbital notches and predorsal keels, longer maxillary barbels, and less numerous teeth and branched rays in the caudal fin.

== Genera ==
Loricariinae contains the following genera:

- Brochiloricaria Isbrücker & Nijssen, 1979
- Cheilonimata Provenzano, 2023
- Crossoloricaria Isbrücker, 1979
- Cteniloricaria Isbrücker & Nijssen, 1979
- Dasyloricaria Isbrücker & Nijssen, 1979
- Dentectus Martín Salazar, Isbrücker & Nijssen 1982
- Farlowella C. H. Eigenmann & R. S. Eigenmann, 1889
- Fonchiiloricaria Rodriguez, Ortega & Covain, 2011
- Furcodontichthys Rapp Py-Daniel, 1981
- Harttia Steindachner, 1877
- Harttiella Boeseman, 1971
- Hemiodontichthys Bleeker, 1862
- Lamontichthys P. Miranda Ribeiro, 1939
- Limatulichthys Isbrücker & Nijssen, 1979
- Loricaria Linnaeus, 1758
- Loricariichthys Bleeker, 1862
- Metaloricaria Isbrücker, 1975
- Paraloricaria Isbrücker, 1979
- Planiloricaria Isbrücker 1971
- Proloricaria Isbrücker, 2001
- Pseudohemiodon Bleeker, 1862
- Pseudoloricaria Bleeker, 1862
- Pterosturisoma Isbrücker & Nijssen, 1978
- Pyxiloricaria Isbrücker & Nijssen, 1984
- Reganella C. H. Eigenmann, 1905
- Rhadinoloricaria Isbrücker & Nijssen, 1974
- Ricola Isbrücker & Nijssen, 1978
- Rineloricaria Bleeker, 1862
- Spatuloricaria Schultz, 1944
- Sturisoma Swainson, 1838
- Sturisomatichthys Isbrücker & Nijssen, 1979
