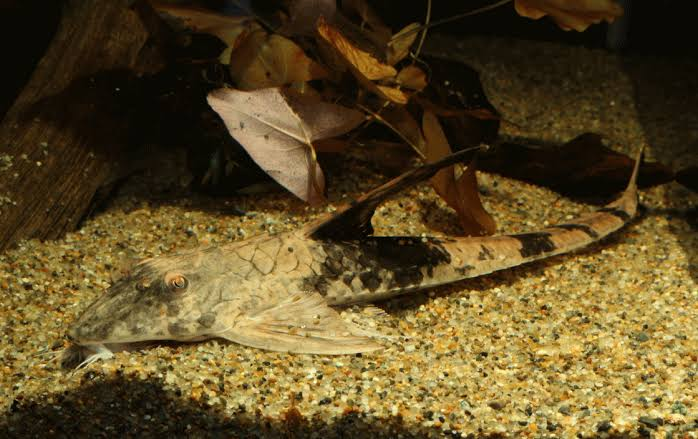
- Loricaria simillima

Scientific classification
- Kingdom: Animalia
- Phylum: Chordata
- Class: Actinopterygii
- Division: Teleostei
- (unranked): Otophysi
- Order: Siluriformes
- Suborder: Loricarioidei
- Family: Loricariidae; Rafinesque, 1815

Subfamilies
- see text

= Loricariidae =

Loricariidae Temporal range: Late Oligocene–Present Possible Cenomanian record

Largest family of catfish

Loricariidae is the largest family of catfish (order Siluriformes), with over 90 genera and just over 680 species. Loricariids originate from freshwater habitats of Costa Rica, Panama, and tropical and subtropical South America. These fish are noted for the bony plates covering their bodies and their suckermouths. Several genera are sold as "plecos", notably the suckermouth catfish, Hypostomus plecostomus, and are popular as aquarium fish.

== Common names ==
Members of the family Loricariidae are commonly referred to as loricariids, suckermouth catfishes, armoured catfish, or suckermouth armoured catfish. The name "plecostomus", and its shortened forms "pleco" and "plec", are used for many Loricariidae, since Plecostomus plecostomus (now called Hypostomus plecostomus) was one of the first loricariid species imported for the fish-keeping hobby.

Some loricariids are not normally considered "plecostomus", such as Farlowella catfish.

In their native range, these fish are known as cascudos or acarís.

=== L-numbers ===
Some types of loricariids are often referred to by their 'L-number'; this has become common since imports of loricariid catfish from South America often included specimens that had not been taxonomically described. Currently, L-numbers are used not only by fish-keeping enthusiasts, but also by biologists, since they represent a useful stopgap until a new species of fish is given a full taxonomic name. In some cases, two different L-numbered catfish have turned out to be different populations of the same species, while in other cases, multiple (but superficially similar) species have all been traded under a single L-number.

== Taxonomy and evolution ==
Because of their highly specialized morphology, loricariids have been recognized as a monophyletic assemblage in even the earliest classifications of the Siluriformes, meaning they consist of a natural grouping with a common ancestor and all of its descendants. Loricariidae is one of seven families in the superfamily Loricarioidea, along with Amphiliidae, Trichomycteridae, Nematogenyidae, Callichthyidae, Scoloplacidae, and Astroblepidae. Some of these families also exhibit suckermouths or armor, although never in the same individual, as in loricariids.

This is the largest catfish family, including about 684 species in around 92 genera, with new species being described each year. However, this family is in flux, and revisions are likely. For example, the subfamily Ancistrinae is accepted as late as the 2006 edition of Nelson's Fishes of the World; it later becomes grouped as a tribe, because of its recognition as a sister group to the Pterygoplichthyini. Under Ambruster, six subfamilies are recognized: Delturinae, Hypoptopomatinae, Hypostominae, Lithogeneinae, Loricariinae, and Neoplecostominae.

Monophyly for the family is strongly supported, except, possibly, the inclusion of Lithogenes. Lithogenes is the only genus within the subfamily Lithogeneinae. This genus and subfamily, the most basal group in Loricariidae, is the sister group to the rest of the family. Neoplecostominae are the most basal group among the loricariids with the exception of Lithogeneinae. However, the genera of Neoplecostominae do not appear to form a monophyletic assemblage. The two subfamilies Loricariinae and Hypoptopomatinae appear to be generally regarded as monophyletic. However, the monophyly and composition of the other subfamilies are currently being examined and will likely be altered substantially in the future. The Hypostominae are the largest subfamily of Loricariidae. It is made up of five tribes. Four of the five tribes, Corymbophanini, Hypostomini, Pterygoplichthyini, and Rhinelepini, include about 24 genera. The fifth and largest tribe, Ancistrini (formerly recognized as its own subfamily), includes 30 genera.

Loricariid fossils are extremely rare. The earliest known definitive taxon is Taubateia from the Late Oligocene-Early Miocene in Brazil. The putative Cenomanian member Afrocascudo, initially described as the earliest loricariid catfish in 2024, might represent a juvenile obaichthyid lepisosteiform, possibly a junior synonym of Obaichthys, though this has been disputed based on the complete ossification of the bones indicating full maturity and the absence of important holostean characters. Within the superfamily Loricarioidea, the Loricariidae are the most derived; in this superfamily, the trend is toward increasingly complex jaw morphology, which may have allowed for the great diversification of the Loricariidae, which have the most advanced jaws.

== Subfamilies and genera ==
Loricariidae is divided into the following subfamilies and genera:

- Subfamily Lithogeninae Gosline, 1947 (climbing armored catfishes)
  - Lithogenes C. H. Eigenmann, 1909
- Subfamily Delturinae Reis, E. H. L. Pereira & Armbruster, 2006 (primitive suckermouth catfishes)
  - Delturus C. H. Eigenmann & R. S. Eigenmann 1889
  - Hemipsilichthys C. H. Eigenmann & R. S. Eigenmann, 1889
- Subfamily Rhinelepinae Armbruster, 2004 (rhinelepine plecos)
  - Pogonopoma Regan, 1904
  - Pseudorinelepis Bleeker, 1862
  - Rhinelepis Agassiz, 1829
- Subfamily Loricariinae Rafinesque, 1815 (mailed catfishes)
  - Brochiloricaria Isbrücker & Nijssen, 1979
  - Cheilonimata Provenzano, 2023
  - Crossoloricaria Isbrücker, 1979
  - Cteniloricaria Isbrücker & Nijssen, 1979
  - Dasyloricaria Isbrücker & Nijssen, 1979
  - Dentectus Martín Salazar, Isbrücker & Nijssen 1982
  - Farlowella C. H. Eigenmann & R. S. Eigenmann, 1889
  - Fonchiiloricaria Rodriguez, Ortega & Covain, 2011
  - Furcodontichthys Rapp Py-Daniel, 1981
  - Harttia Steindachner, 1877
  - Harttiella Boeseman, 1971
  - Hemiodontichthys Bleeker, 1862
  - Lamontichthys P. Miranda Ribeiro, 1939
  - Limatulichthys Isbrücker & Nijssen, 1979
  - Loricaria Linnaeus, 1758
  - Loricariichthys Bleeker, 1862
  - Metaloricaria Isbrücker, 1975
  - Paraloricaria Isbrücker, 1979
  - Planiloricaria Isbrücker 1971
  - Proloricaria Isbrücker, 2001
  - Pseudohemiodon Bleeker, 1862
  - Pseudoloricaria Bleeker, 1862
  - Pterosturisoma Isbrücker & Nijssen, 1978
  - Pyxiloricaria Isbrücker & Nijssen, 1984
  - Reganella C. H. Eigenmann, 1905
  - Rhadinoloricaria Isbrücker & Nijssen, 1974
  - Ricola Isbrücker & Nijssen, 1978
  - Rineloricaria Bleeker, 1862
  - Spatuloricaria Schultz, 1944
  - Sturisoma Swainson, 1838
  - Sturisomatichthys Isbrücker & Nijssen, 1979
- Subfamily Hypoptopomatinae C. H. Eigenmann & R. S. Eigenmann, 1890 (cascudinhos)
  - Acestridium Haseman, 1911
  - Chauliocheilos Martins, Andrade, Rosa & Langeani, 2014
  - Corumbataia Britski, 1997
  - Curculionichthys Roxo, Silva, Ochoa & Oliveira, 2015
  - Epactionotus Reis & Schaefer, 1998
  - Eurycheilichthys Reis & Schaefer, 1993
  - Euryochus E. H. L. Pereira & Reis, 2017
  - Hirtella E. H. L. Pereira, Zanata, Cetra & Reis, 2014
  - Hisonotus C. H. Eigenmann & R. S. Eigenmann, 1889
  - Hypoptopoma Günther, 1868
  - Isbrueckerichthys Derijst, 1996
  - Kronichthys A. Miranda Ribeiro, 1908
  - Lampiella Isbrücker, 2001
  - Leptotocinclus Delapieve, Lehmann A & Reis, 2018
  - Microlepidogaster C. H. Eigenmann & R. S. Eigenmann, 1889
  - Nannoptopoma Schaefer, 1996
  - Nannoxyropsis Delapieve, Lehmann A & Reis, 2018
  - Neoplecostomus C. H. Eigenmann & R. S. Eigenmann, 1888
  - Niobichthys Schaefer & Provenzano, 1998
  - Otocinclus Cope, 1871
  - Otothyris Myers, 1927
  - Otothyropsis Ribeiro, Carvalho & Melo, 2005
  - Oxyropsis C. H. Eigenmann & R. S. Eigenmann, 1889
  - Pareiorhaphis A. Miranda Ribeiro, 1918
  - Pareiorhina Gosline, 1947
  - Parotocinclus C. H. Eigenmann & R. S. Eigenmann, 1889
  - Plesioptopoma Reis, Pereira & Lehmann A., 2012
  - Pseudotocinclus Nichols, 1919
  - Pseudotothyris Britski & Garavello, 1984
  - Rhinolekos Martins & Langeani. 2011
  - Rhinotocinclus Reis & Lehmann A., 2022
  - Schizolecis Britski & Garavello, 1984
- Subfamily Hypostominae Kner, 1853 (suckermouth catfishes)
  - Acanthicus Agassiz, 1829
  - Ancistomus Isbrücker & Seidel, 2001
  - Ancistrus Kner, 1854
  - Andeancistrus Lujan, Meza-Vargas & Barriga Salazar, 2015
  - Aphanotorulus Isbrücker & Nijssen, 1983
  - Araichthys Zawadzki, Bifi & Mariotto, 2016
  - Avalithoxus Lujan, Armbruster & Lovejoy, 2018
  - Baryancistrus Rapp Py-Daniel, 1989
  - Chaetostoma Tschudi, 1846
  - Colossimystax Armbruster & Lujan, 2025
  - Corymbophanes C. H. Eigenmann, 1909
  - Cordylancistrus Isbrücker, 1980
  - Cryptancistrus Fisch-Muller, Mol & Covain, 2018
  - Dekeyseria Rapp Py-Daniel, 1985
  - Dolichancistrus Isbrücker, 1980
  - Exastilithoxus Isbrücker & Nijssen, 1979
  - Guyanancistrus Isbrücker, 2001
  - Hemiancistrus Bleeker, 1862
  - Hopliancistrus Isbrücker & Nijssen, 1989
  - Hypancistrus Isbrücker & Nijssen, 1991
  - Hypostomus Lacépède, 1803
  - Isorineloricaria Isbrücker, 1980
  - Lasiancistrus Regan, 1904
  - Leporacanthicus Isbrücker & Nijssen, 1989
  - Leptoancistrus Meek & Hildebrand, 1916
  - Lithoxancistrus Isbrücker, Nijssen & Cala, 1988
  - Lithoxus C. H. Eigenmann, 1910
  - Megalancistrus Isbrücker, 1980
  - Neblinichthys Ferraris, Isbrücker & Nijssen, 1986
  - Panaqolus Isbrücker & Schraml, 2001
  - Panaque C. H. Eigenmann & R. S. Eigenmann, 1889
  - Paralithoxus Boeseman, 1982
  - Parancistrus Bleeker, 1862
  - Paulasquama Armbruster & Taphorn, 2011
  - Peckoltia A. Miranda Ribeiro, 1912
  - Peckoltichthys A. Miranda Ribeiro, 1917
  - Pseudacanthicus Bleeker, 1862
  - Pseudancistrus Bleeker, 1862
  - Pseudolithoxus Isbrücker & Werner, 2001
  - Pseudoqolus Lujan, Cramer, Covain, Fisch-Muller & López-Fernández, 2017
  - Pterygoplichthys Gill, 1858
  - Scobinancistrus Isbrücker & Nijssen, 1989
  - Spectracanthicus Nijssen & Isbrücker, 1987
  - Stellantia Armbruster & Lujan, 2025
  - Transancistrus Lujan, Meza-Vargas & Barriga Salazar, 2015
  - Yaluwak Lujan & Armbruster, 2019
- incertae sedis
  - Microplecostomus Silva, Roxo, Ochoa & Oliveira, 2016
  - Nannoplecostomus Ribeiro, F. C. T. Lima & E. H. L. Pereira, 2012

== Distribution and habitat ==
The family Loricariidae is vastly distributed over both the east and west sides of the Andes Mountains, but most species are generally restricted to small geographic ranges. They are primarily found in freshwater habitats of South America, but several loricariines and hypostomines are native to Panama, and two species (Fonchiiichthys uracanthus and Hemiancistrus aspidolepis) are native to Costa Rica. Species occur in swift-flowing streams from the lowlands up to 3,000 m (9,800 ft) in elevation. They can also be found in a variety of other freshwater environments. They can be found in torrential mountain rivers, quiet brackish estuaries, black acidic waters, and even in subterranean habitats.

== Description and biology ==
This family has extremely variable color patterns and body shapes. Loricariids are characterized by bony plates covering their bodies, similar to the bony plates in callichthyids. (In Latin, lorica means corselet). These fish exhibit a ventral suckermouth, with papillae (small projections) on the lips. When present, the adipose fin usually has a spine at the forward edge. These fish have, when they are present, a unique pair of maxillary barbels. These fish have relatively long intestines due to their usually herbivorous or detrivorous diets. The body is characteristically flattened in this family. Taste buds cover almost the entire surface of the body and fin spines. Body lengths can range from 2.22 cm (0.87 in) in Nannoplecostomus eleonorae to over 100 cm (39 in) in Panaque, Acanthicus, and Pterygoplichthys.

One of the most obvious characteristics of the loricariids is the suckermouth. The modified mouth and lips allow the fish to feed, breathe, and attach to the substrate through suction. The lips were once believed to be unable to function as a sucker while respiration continued, as the inflowing water would cause the system to fail; however, respiration and suction can function simultaneously. Inflowing water passing under the sucker is limited to a thin stream immediately behind each maxillary barbel; the maxillae in loricariids support only small maxillary barbels and are primarily used to mediate the lateral lip tissue in which they are embedded, preventing failure of suction during inspiration. To achieve suction, the fish presses its lips against the substrate and expands its oral cavity, causing negative pressure.

Also, unlike most other catfishes, the premaxillae are highly mobile, and the lower jaws have evolved towards a medial position, with the teeth pointed rostroventrally; these are important evolutionary innovations. The fish rotates its lower and upper jaws to scrape the substrate. Of the two, the lower jaws are more mobile.

Loricariid catfishes have evolved several modifications of their digestive tracts that function as accessory respiratory organs or hydrostatic organs. These complex structures would have been independently evolved a number of times within the family. This includes an enlarged stomach in the Pterygoplichthyini, Hypostomus, and Lithoxus, a U-shaped diverticulum in Rhinelepini, and a ring-like diverticulum in Otocinclus. Of note, even loricariids with unmodified stomachs have a slight ability to breathe air.

Considerable sexual dimorphism occurs in this family, most pronounced during the breeding season. For example, in Loricariichthys, the male has a large expansion of its lower lip, which it uses to hold a clutch of eggs. Ancistrus males have snouts with fleshy tentacles. In loricariids, odontodes develop almost anywhere on the external surface of the body and first appear soon after hatching; odontodes appear in a variety of shapes and sizes and are often sexually dimorphic, being larger in breeding males. In most Ancistrini species, sharp, evertible cheek spines (elongated odontodes) are often more developed in males and are used in intraspecific displays and combat.

=== Omega iris ===
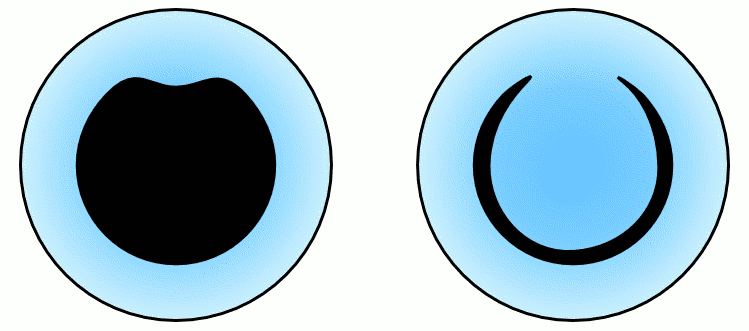
The omega iris allows loricariids to adjust the amount of light that enters their eye.

Unusual for bony fish, many species have a modified iris called an omega iris. The dorsal segment of the iris expands downward over the pupil to form a loop which can expand and contract, called an iris operculum; when light levels are high, the pupil reduces in diameter and the loop expands to cover the center of the pupil, giving rise to a crescent-shaped, light-transmitting partial pupil. This feature gets its name from its similarity to an upside-down uppercase Greek letter omega (Ω). The origins of this structure are unknown, but breaking up the outline of the highly visible eye has been suggested to aid camouflage in what are often highly mottled animals. Species in the tribe Rhinelepini are an exceptional group among loricariids, having a circular iris. The presence or absence of the iris operculum can be used for identification of species in the subfamily Loricariinae.

== Genetics ==
As of 2000, only 56 loricariid species have been cytogenically investigated. The basal diploid number of chromosomes is 2n = 54 in this family, but with a wide variation in the chromosome number in this fish group, ranging from 2n = 36 in the Loricariinae, Rineloricaria latirostris, to 2n = 96 in a species of Upsilodus (Hemipsilichthys). Most members of the Ancistrini and Pterygoplichthyini have 52 chromosomes. Karyotypic evolution by means of centric fusions and centric fissions seems to be a common feature among loricariids; this is demonstrated by a higher number of biarmed chromosomes in species with lower diploid number and many uniarmed chromosomes in species with higher diploid numbers. Studies conducted with representatives of some genera of Hypostominae showed, within this group, the diploid number ranges from 2n = 52 to 2n = 80. However, the supposed wide karyotypic diversity the family Loricariidae or the subfamily Hypostominae would present is almost exclusively restricted to the genus Hypostomus, and the species from the other genera had a conserved diploid number. In some species, there is a ZZ/ZW sex-determination system.

== Ecology ==
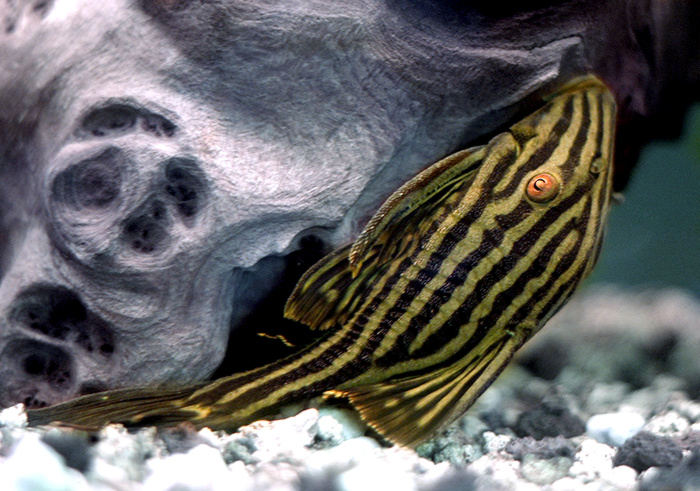
Panaque nigrolineatus attached to a piece of wood

The suckermouth exhibited by these catfish allows them to adhere to objects in their habitats, even in fast-flowing waters. The mouth and teeth also are adapted to feed on a variety of foods, such as algae, invertebrates, and detritus. Some species, notably the Panaque, are known for xylophagy, or the ability to digest wood.

Most species of loricariids are nocturnal animals. Some species are territorial, while others, such as Otocinclus, prefer to live in groups.

Air-breathing is well known among many loricariids; this ability is dependent on the risk of hypoxia faced by a species; torrent-dwelling species tend to have no ability to breathe air, while low-land, pool-dwelling species, such as those of Hypostomus, have a great ability to breathe air. Pterygoplichthys is known for being kept out of water and sold alive in fish markets, surviving up to 30 hours out of water. Loricariids are facultative air breathers; they will only breathe air if under stress and will only use their gills in situations when oxygen levels are high. The dry season is a likely time for this; there would be little food in the stomach, which would allow its use for air breathing.

Loricariids exhibit a wide range of reproductive strategies, including cavity spawning, attachment of eggs on the underside of rocks, and egg-carrying. Parental care is usually good, and the male guards the eggs and sometimes the larvae. The eggs hatch after four to 20 days, depending on the species.

Three species known from subterranean habitats are true troglobites with reduced pigmentation (appearing overall whitish) and eyes: Ancistrus cryptophthalmus, A. galani and A. formoso. Similar adaptions with reduced pigmentation are known from two loricariids found in deep water in large Amazonian rivers, Peckoltia pankimpuju and Panaque bathyphilus.

== In the aquarium ==
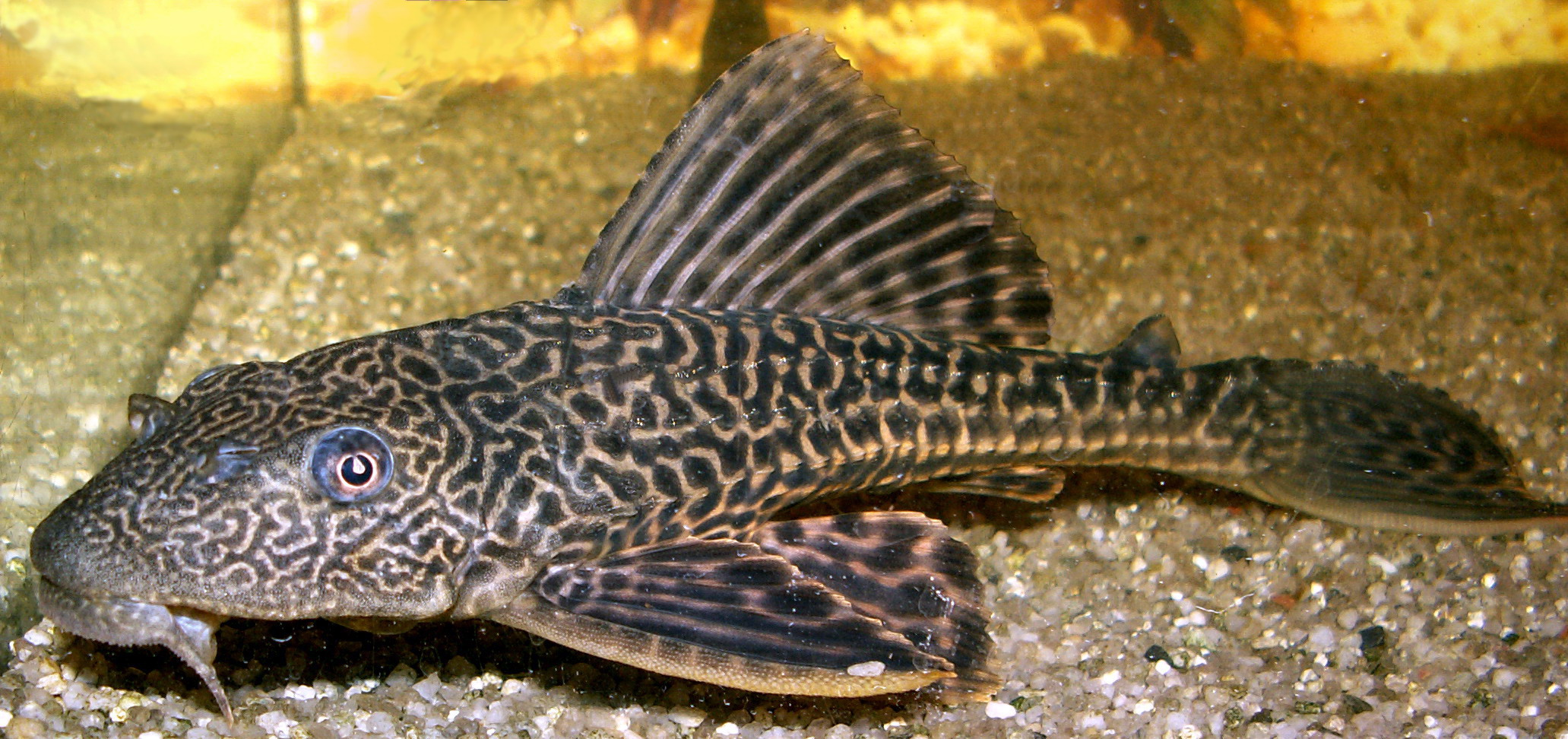
Pterygoplichthys multiradiatus, often sold as a common pleco, is an aquarium fish often purchased as an algae eater.

Loricariids are popular aquarium fish, where they are often sold as "plecs", "plecos" or "plecostomus". These fish are often purchased because of their algae-eating habits, though this role may not be carried out. Loricariid are either vegetarian, omnivore, carnivore or wood-eaters. A great many species of loricariids are also sold for their ornamental qualities, representing many body shapes and colors.

Most species of loricariids are nocturnal and will shy away from bright light, appreciating some sort of cover to hide under throughout the day. As they often originate from habitats with fast-moving water, filtration should be vigorous.

A number of species of loricariids have been bred in captivity.
