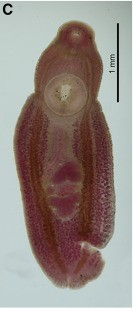

Scientific classification
- Kingdom: Animalia
- Phylum: Platyhelminthes
- Class: Trematoda
- Order: Diplostomida
- Family: Clinostomidae
- Genus: Clinostomum
- Species: C. complanatum

Binomial name
- Clinostomum complanatum Rudolphi, 1814

= Clinostomum complanatum =

Parasitic trematode

Clinostomum complanatum is a species of digenean trematodes (flukes) of the family Clinostomidae, first described by Rudolphi in 1814.: It's an unsegmented, leaf-shaped parasitic flatworm. All flukes are hermaphroditic and reproduce sexually and asexually at different points in its life cycle, depending on the host it is inhabiting. Its life cycle consists of two intermediate hosts and one definitive host. Intermediate hosts include mollusks (freshwater gastropods) and vertebrates (freshwater fish and amphibians), and its definitive hosts are piscivorous birds, but occasionally are mammals or reptiles.

This fish-borne ectoparasite is thought to be responsible for Halzoun syndrome, a rare disease transmitted after the consumption of raw or undercooked freshwater fish that are infected with metacercaria of C. complanatum. These flukes rarely impact humans, but the spread of cuisine utilizing raw or undercooked freshwater fish, as well as migratory birds, have increased the threat of zoonotic transmission.

== Morphology ==
Mature C. complanatum are a translucent reddish yellow with body lengths ranging from about 2–6 millimeters (average 4 mm) and body widths of 0.9–2 millimeters (average 1.4 mm). The body is convex dorsally and flattens toward the posterior and is widest near the gonads, narrowing at the ventral sucker. A well-developed oral collar surrounds a small oral sucker, with a muscular esophagus and prominent esophageal bulb present; a pharynx is absent. The ventral sucker is medium-sized. Two intestinal caeca extend to the posterior end and connect to a V-shaped excretory vesicle, both filled with dark brown material. Longitudinal excretory ducts run forward toward the ventral sucker. The testes are deeply lobed and triangular. A small cirrus-sac containing reproductive structures lies between the anterior testis and intestines, overlapping a small, deeply lobed ovary. The genital pore is located to the right of the body's midline. The vitellarium is extensive, stretching from behind the ventral sucker to the ends of the caeca. The uterus opens near the ventral sucker, with mature eggs in the uterine sac and immature eggs between the testes.

Metacercariae vary in color from pale yellow to yellow. Length varies from 5 to 10 millimeters and are oval in shape. They are able to be seen with the naked eye.

== Taxonomy ==
The genus Clinostomum Leidy, 1856, is made up of over 50 species (some argue there are only 16 valid species). Its taxonomic history has been unstable, with reports of C. complanatum described in absence of the knowledge of other species. Species of this genus are very similar and some only differ in minor characters. Few morphological traits have been identified to reliably differentiate between species for morphological speciation, including the anterior extent of vitellarium, the presence of lateral evaginations in the uterine sac, gonad location in the body, testicular shape, genital pore location relative to gonads, and cirrus pouch location relative to other organs. Identification of species is based on characters found in adult stages, further increasing confusion and potential error in geographical distribution reportings.

=== C. complanatum vs C. marginatum ===
The taxonomic validity of these two common species has been disputed for over 200 years. Both names continue to be used for specimens collected across North and South America. A paper by Caffara et al. (2011) confirms the validity of Clinostomum marginatum as a junior species, with ~1% differences in its rDNA (ribosomal DNA) sequences. Additionally, they found reliable morphological differences in the genital complex at developmental stages (adult and metacercariae) of both species. This paper also proposed that C. marginatum represents the "American (New World)" species, and C. complanatum is the "European (Old World)" species.

== Life cycle ==
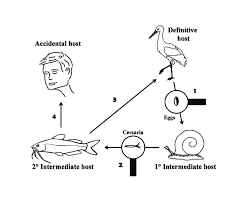
Biological cycle of Clinostomum complanatum

C. complanatum has been described as an ectoparasite of piscovorous (fish-eating) birds and fresh and brackish water fish. Its life cycle has been studied by several authors determining that it includes a mollusk as its first intermediate host, a fish as its second intermediate host, and a fish-eating bird as its definitive, or final, host.

The cycle begins with a mollusk feeding on the feces of an infected bird and ingesting the parasite eggs. Within the freshwater gastropod, miracidia hatch from eggs and undergo several rounds of asexual reproduction, developing into sporocysts, rediae, and finally brevifurcate cercariae. Free cercariae leave the mollusk and infect a fish by penetrating the skin and encysting muscle tissue, where they develop into metacercariae. A bird feeds on the fish, and the parasite is then freed into its digestive tract, restarting the cycle. However, if a man eats the raw or undercooked meat of an infected fish, they might become an accidental host.

=== Hosts ===
Disclaimer: This is not an all-inclusive list of hosts; these are just a few known hosts.

First Intermediate Hosts: Mollusks

1. Brazil:
  - Biomphalaria peregrin
2. Italy:
  - Lymnaea stagnalis
  - Radix ovata
3. China:
  - Radix swinhoei
  - Galba pervia
4. Korea
  - Radix auricularia coreana

Second Intermediate Hosts: Fish and Amphibians

1. Brazil:
  - Loricariichthys platymetopon
  - Parauchenipterus galeatus
  - Hoplosternum littorale
  - Hoplias malabaricus
  - Loricaria spp.
2. Italy:
  - Perca fluviatilis (European perch)
  - Triturus carnifex (Italian crested newt)
  - Lissotriton vulgaris (Smooth newt)
  - Cobitis bilineata (Italian spined loach)
3. Croatia:
  - Squalius cephalus (Common chub or European chub)
  - Cyprinus carpio (Common carp)
4. India:
  - Macrognathus aral (One-stripe spiny eel)
5. China:
  - Myxocyprinus asiaticus (Chinese sucker)

Definitive Hosts: Birds

1. Australia:
  - Egretta alba (Great egret)
  - Egretta garzetta (Little egret)
  - Egretta intermedia plumifera (Plumed egret)
  - Nycticorax caledonicus (Nankeen night heron)
  - Ardea novaehollandiae (White-faced heron)
2. Brazil: On the floodplain of the high Paraná River in Brazil, it is assumed that A. cocoi and P. brasilianus are the main definitive hosts due to their feeding behavior. These species feed mainly on detritivorous fish (such as H. littorale).
  - Ardea cocoi (Cocoi heron)
  - Phalacrocorax brasilianus (Neotropic cormorant)
  - Egretta alba (Great egret)
  - Egretta thula (Snowy egret)
3. Iran
  - Ardea purpurea (Purple heron)
  - Nycticorax nycticorax (Black-crowned night heron)
  - Egretta alba (Great egret)
  - Egretta garzetta (Little egret)

== Zoonotic significance ==
Accidental human infections can and have occurred with the ingestion of infected raw or undercooked fish. These cases, although rare, are more likely to be reported in countries where eating raw fish is common, such as coastal regions and Asian countries.

=== Pathological effect ===
==== Fish ====
Yellow Grub Disease: Metacercariae are found in the mandible, muscles, and oral cavities of freshwater fish. It is common for metacercariae to persist in the walls of the anterior portion of the digestive tract as well as the branchial cavity. A study in Croatia found the metacercariae were more likely to be found in striated muscle tissue and connective tissue. These metacercariae, aka "yellow grubs", are capable of inducing oxidative stress and tissue injury, leading to host death. Depending on the infected fish, the intensity of infection differs. For example, the intensity of infection ranged from 11 to 136 metacercariae per infected S. cephalus (chub), but only 2 to 7 metacercariae per infected C. carpio (common carp) in the Orljava River, Croatia. This study also found that the affected fish appeared "healthy" initially, but throughout the duration of the study, two heavily infected chubs began to exhibit behavioral changes, such as erratic swimming and flashing.

Although it is assumed that these yellow grubs have caused massive losses to natural fish resources and the worldwide aquaculture industry, there is limited research on the etiology and pathology of this disease. There are few reports of clinostome infections causing host tissue damage, but others report these fish become malnourished or lethargic, thus making them easier for birds to catch.

==== Birds ====
Adult parasites reside in buccal cavities of piscivorous birds. They attach to the esophageal mucosa (usually in the first 10 cm of the esophagus), oral cavity, and lungs of these birds. Intense necrosis was observed in attachment sites, as well as inflammation going as deep as the musculature. The parasites observed in the muscular layer of Nycticorax nycticorx (black-crowned night heron) were surrounded by a thin zone of necrotic cells and a fibrous tissue capsule. The authors of the study (Shamsi et al. 2013) suggested the damaged tissue would impact the bird's ability to eat and lead to malnutrition, weakening the bird's immune system, and making the bird more vulnerable to pathogens.

==== Humans ====
While C. complanatum commonly infects the pharynx, larynx, or upper esophagus of piscivorous birds, cases of human infection are rare. Infection in humans occur when raw or undercooked fish infected with metacercariae is ingested. The metacercariae excyst in the stomach and migrate to throat/esophagus. The parasite attaches to the esophageal mucosa by utilizing its ventral sucker, and matures; the migration through the digestive tract may take a few days (symptoms appear after several days). This causes acute pharyngitis or laryngitis. This infection has been called "Halzoun syndrome" or clinostomiasis. Currently infections have been reported mainly in Asian countries, where eating raw fish is traditional. One case study of an infection explained the patient suddenly developed a "violent cough and irritable sensation in the throat," alongside intermittent throat soreness. There is currently no effective antiparasitic drug. Mechanical removal of the fluke is necessary (i.e. endoscopy). Even after removal, it is possible that more metacercariae remain in the digestive tract; it is important to examine the throat and perform an upper gastrointestinal endoscopy to ensure there are no residual parasites.

== Management efforts ==
As the demand for fish production rises across the world due to human consumption, strict and effective regulation should be implemented by professionals involved in the fish production chain. Fish impacted by these yellow grubs can have a large economic impact on fish farming, as the grubs appear unappealing and the fish are discarded. Discarded infected fish coupled with migratory birds can lead to the spread of C. complanatum and the expansion of its natural habitat.
