= Loricariichthys ucayalensis =

Conservation status
- Least Concern (IUCN 3.1)

Scientific classification
- Kingdom: Animalia
- Phylum: Chordata
- Class: Actinopterygii
- Order: Siluriformes
- Family: Loricariidae
- Genus: Loricariichthys
- Species: L. ucayalensis

Binomial name
- Loricariichthys ucayalensis Regan, 1913

Species of catfish

Loricariichthys ucayalensis is a species of freshwater ray-finned fish belonging to the family Loricariidae, the suckermouth armored catfishes, and the subfamily Loricariinae, the mailed catfishes. This catfish occurs in the upper Amazon River drainage in Peru, its type locality being the Ucayali River. This species reaches a maximum total length of 22 cm (8.7 in) and is believed to be a facultative air-breather.
