= Loricariichthys chanjoo =

Conservation status
- Data Deficient (IUCN 3.1)

Scientific classification
- Kingdom: Animalia
- Phylum: Chordata
- Class: Actinopterygii
- Order: Siluriformes
- Family: Loricariidae
- Genus: Loricariichthys
- Species: L. chanjoo

Binomial name
- Loricariichthys chanjoo (Fowler, 1940)

Synonyms
- Parahemiodon chanjoo Fowler, 1940

Species of catfish

Loricariichthys chanjoo, one of a number of Loricariichthys species commonly known as Shitari, is a species of catfish belonging to the family Loricariidae, the suckermouth armored catfishes, and the subfamily Loricariinae, the mailed catfishes. It is endemic to Peru, where it occurs in the Ucayali River basin, with its type locality being listed as Contamana. The species reaches 23 centimetres (9.1 in) in length and is believed to be a facultative air-breather.
