= Loricariichthys nudirostris =

Conservation status
- Least Concern (IUCN 3.1)

Scientific classification
- Kingdom: Animalia
- Phylum: Chordata
- Class: Actinopterygii
- Order: Siluriformes
- Family: Loricariidae
- Genus: Loricariichthys
- Species: L. nudirostris

Binomial name
- Loricariichthys nudirostris (Kner, 1853)

Synonyms
- Loricaria nudirostris Kner, 1853

Species of catfish

Loricariichthys nudirostris is a species of freshwater ray-finned fish belonging to the family Loricariidae, the suckermouth armored catfishes, and the subfamily Loricariinae, the mailed catfishes.. It is endemic to Brazil, where it occurs in the Amazon River basin in the states of Amazonas and Pará. This species reaches a maximum standard length of 23.5 cm (9.3 in), can weigh up to at least 89.64 g (3.162 oz), and is believed to be a facultative air-breather.
