= Loricariichthys acutus =

Conservation status
- Least Concern (IUCN 3.1)

Scientific classification
- Kingdom: Animalia
- Phylum: Chordata
- Class: Actinopterygii
- Order: Siluriformes
- Family: Loricariidae
- Genus: Loricariichthys
- Species: L. acutus

Binomial name
- Loricariichthys acutus (Valenciennes, 1840)

Synonyms
- Loricaria acuta Valenciennes, 1840

Species of catfish

Loricariichthys acutus is a species of freshwater ray-finned fish belonging to the family Loricariidae, the suckermouth armored catfishes, and the subfamily Loricariinae, the mailed catfishes. This catfish has a wide distribution in the Amazon basin of Bolivia, Brazuil, Colombia and Peru, the upper Paraguay River basin in Bolivia and Brazil and the Essequibo River in Guyana. L. acutus reaches a maximum standard length of 28 cm (11 in), a maximum weight of 91.6 g (3.23 oz) and is thought to be a facultative air breather.
