= Loricariichthys hauxwelli =

Conservation status
- Least Concern (IUCN 3.1)

Scientific classification
- Kingdom: Animalia
- Phylum: Chordata
- Class: Actinopterygii
- Order: Siluriformes
- Family: Loricariidae
- Genus: Loricariichthys
- Species: L. hauxwelli

Binomial name
- Loricariichthys hauxwelli Fowler, 1915

Species of catfish

Loricariichthys hauxwelli, is a species of freshwater ray-finned fish belonging to the family Loricariidae, the suckermouth armored catfishes, and the subfamily Loricariinae, the mailed catfishes. This catfish is endemic to Peru, where it occurs in the Amazon River basin. This species reaches a maximum standard length of 18 cm (7.1 in) and is thought to be a facultative air breather. It was first described in 1915 by Henry Weed Fowler. The specific name, hauxwelli, honours the collector of the holotype, the British naturalist, explorer and zoological collector, John Hauxwell.
