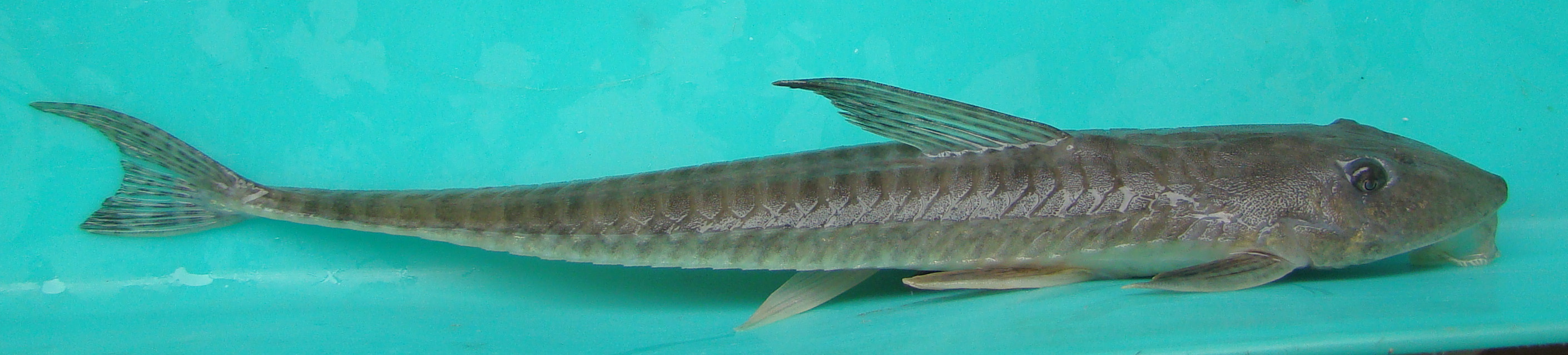

Conservation status
- Least Concern (IUCN 3.1)

Scientific classification
- Kingdom: Animalia
- Phylum: Chordata
- Class: Actinopterygii
- Order: Siluriformes
- Family: Loricariidae
- Genus: Loricariichthys
- Species: L. anus

Binomial name
- Loricariichthys anus (Valenciennes, 1835)

Synonyms
- Loricaria anus Valenciennes, 1835

= Loricariichthys anus =

Species of catfish

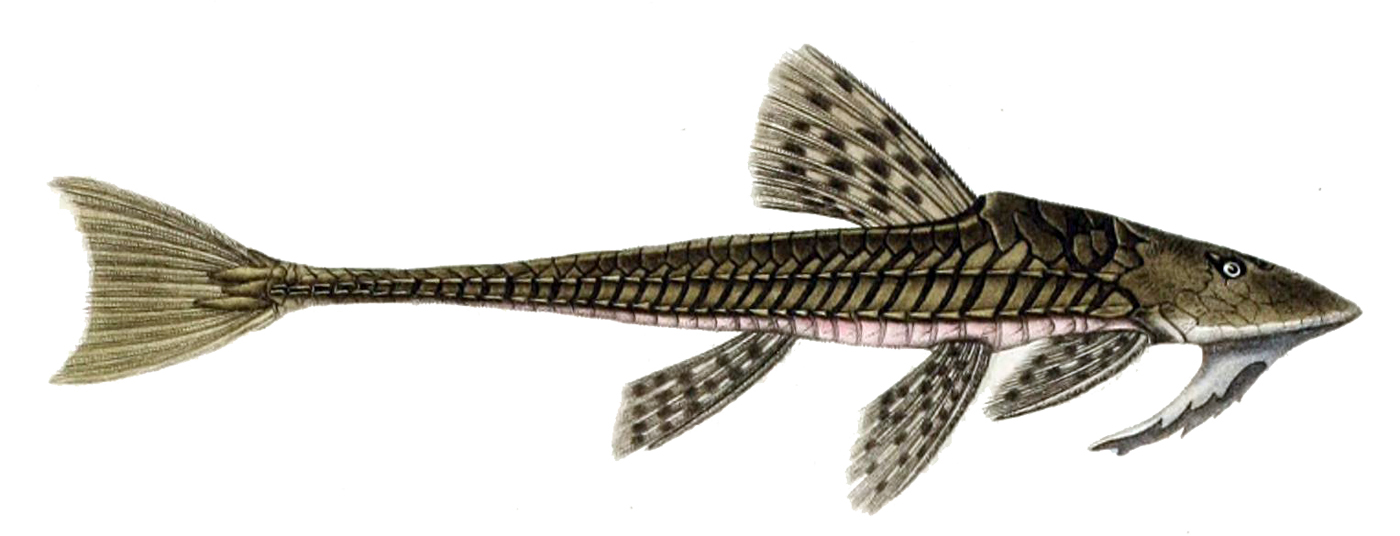
An illustration of Loricariichthys anus.

Loricariichthys anus is a species of freshwater ray-finned fish belonging to the family Loricariidae, the suckermouth armored catfishes, and the subfamily Loricariinae, the mailed catfishes. This catfish occurs in coastal rivers of southern Brazil, as well as the drainage basins of the Uruguay River and the lower Paraná River in Argentina and Uruguay. L. anus reaches a maximum standard length of 46 cm (18 in) and is thought to be a facultative air breather.
