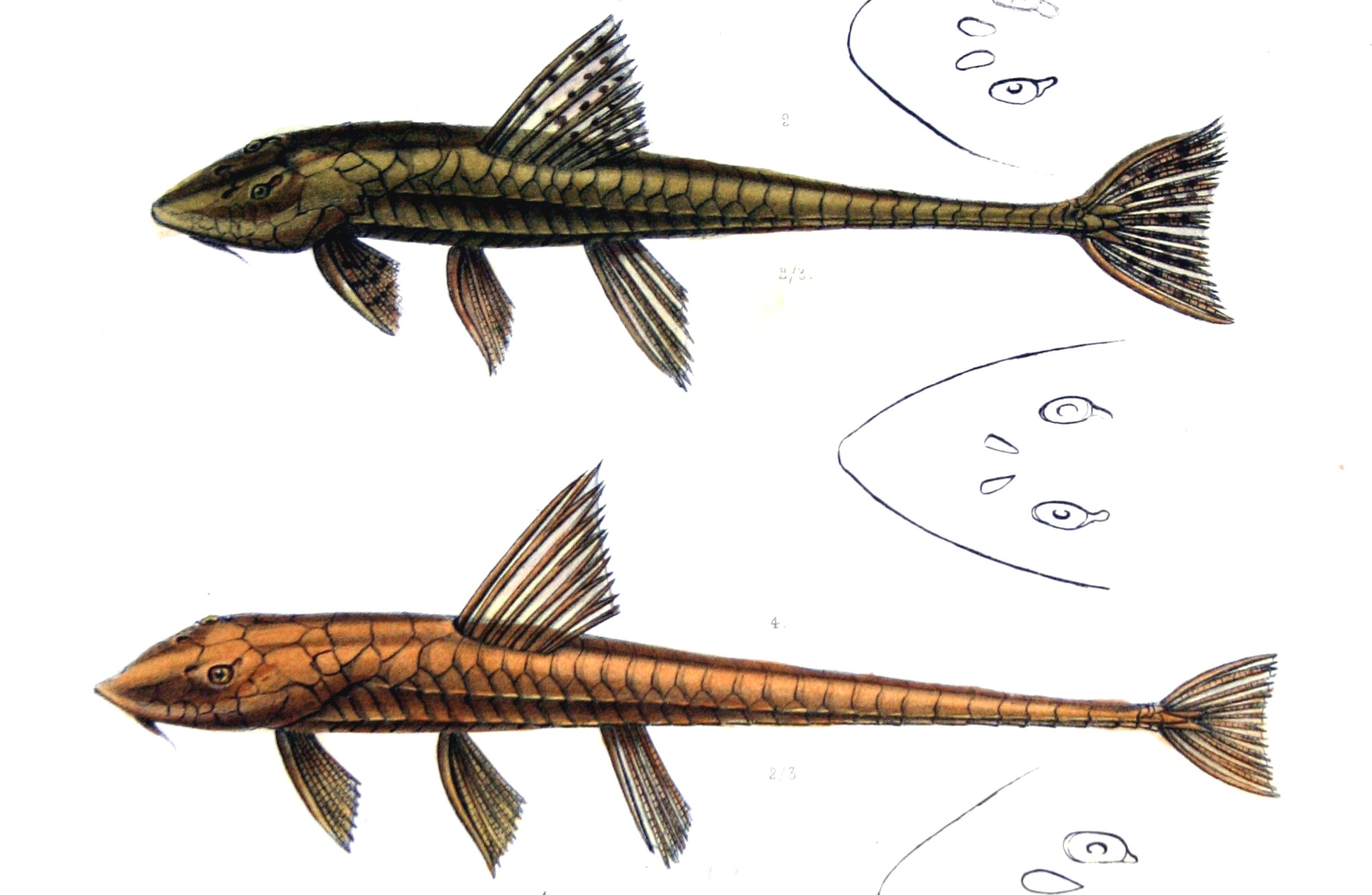
- Loricariichthys maculatus (above) and Loricariichthys castaneus

Scientific classification
- Kingdom: Animalia
- Phylum: Chordata
- Class: Actinopterygii
- Order: Siluriformes
- Family: Loricariidae
- Subfamily: Loricariinae
- Genus: Loricariichthys; Bleeker, 1862

Type species
- Loricaria maculata Bloch 1794

Species
- See § Species

Synonyms
- Plecostomus Swainson, 1839; Parahemiodon Bleeker, 1862

= Loricariichthys =

Genus of fishes

Loricariichthys is a genus of freshwater ray-finned fishes belonging to the family Loricariidae, the suckermouth armored catfishes, and the subfamily Loricariinae, the mailed catfishes. The catfishes in this genus are found in South America.

== Taxonomy ==
Loricariichthys is part of the eponymous Loricariichthys clade within the subfamily Loricariinae; this clade also includes the genera Furcodontichthys, Hemiodontichthys, Limatulichthys, and Pseudoloricaria. Loricariichthys seems to be intermediate between Limatulichthys and Pseudoloricaria on one hand, and Furcodontichthys and Hemiodontichthys on the other. Although this genus is well diagnosed, the species are very similar and difficult to identify. The Loricariinae is a subfamily of the Loricariidae, which is the type family of the suborder Loricarioidei within the order Siluriformes, the catfishes.

== Species ==
Loricariichthys contains the following valid recognised species:

- Loricariichthys acutus (Valenciennes, 1840)
- Loricariichthys anus (Valenciennes, 1835)
- Loricariichthys brunneus (Hancock, 1828)
- Loricariichthys cashibo (C. H. Eigenmann & W. R. Allen, 1942)
- Loricariichthys castaneus (Castelnau, 1855)
- Loricariichthys chanjoo (Fowler, 1940)
- Loricariichthys derbyi Fowler, 1915
- Loricariichthys edentatus Reis & E. H. L. Pereira, 2000
- Loricariichthys hauxwelli Fowler, 1915
- Loricariichthys labialis (Boulenger, 1895)
- Loricariichthys maculatus (Bloch, 1794)
- Loricariichthys melanocheilus Reis & E. H. L. Pereira, 2000
- Loricariichthys melanurus Reis, Vieira & E. H. L. Pereira, 2021
- Loricariichthys microdon (C. H. Eigenmann, 1909)
- Loricariichthys nudirostris (Kner, 1853)
- Loricariichthys platymetopon Isbrücker & Nijssen, 1979
- Loricariichthys rostratus Reis & E. H. L. Pereira, 2000
- Loricariichthys stuebelii (Steindachner, 1882)
- Loricariichthys ucayalensis Regan, 1913

== Distribution ==
Loricariichthys is distributed in most major freshwater drainages east of the Andes and north of Buenos Aires. Loricariichthys is widely distributed in the Amazon basin, the Paraná system, and coastal rivers of the Guiana and Brazilian Shields.

== Description ==
An accessory respiration organ, consisting of a double respiratory purse connected to the distal end of the esophagus, is present in a number of species of Loricariichthys.

The lower lip of immature males and females has two thick, cushionlike structures, which are covered with small papillae and have irregular fringes along the posterior edge. However, in nuptial males of Loricariichthys, the cushionlike structures on the lower lip recede or even disappear, and the lip becomes wider and longer and becomes smooth or covered with minute papillae. Males use this enlarged lower lip to clasp and carry a cluster of developing eggs. This method of carrying eggs is possibly a strategy to protect the eggs from predation, since these fishes commonly live in exposed sandy- or muddy-bottomed environments devoid of places to hide.

A diploid number of 2n = 56 has been reported for two species characterized. A ZZ/ZW sex chromosome system was also reported for L. platymetopon.

== Ecology ==
These species occur in a large diversity of habitat over sandy and muddy bottoms. Like other members of the Loricariichthys group, Loricariichthys species are lip brooders. The male holds the clutch of eggs in a large membranous extension of the lower lip.
