= Loricariichthys brunneus =

Conservation status
- Least Concern (IUCN 3.1)

Scientific classification
- Kingdom: Animalia
- Phylum: Chordata
- Class: Actinopterygii
- Order: Siluriformes
- Family: Loricariidae
- Genus: Loricariichthys
- Species: L. brunneus

Binomial name
- Loricariichthys brunneus (Hancock, 1828)

Synonyms
- Loricaria brunnea Hancock, 1828

Species of catfish

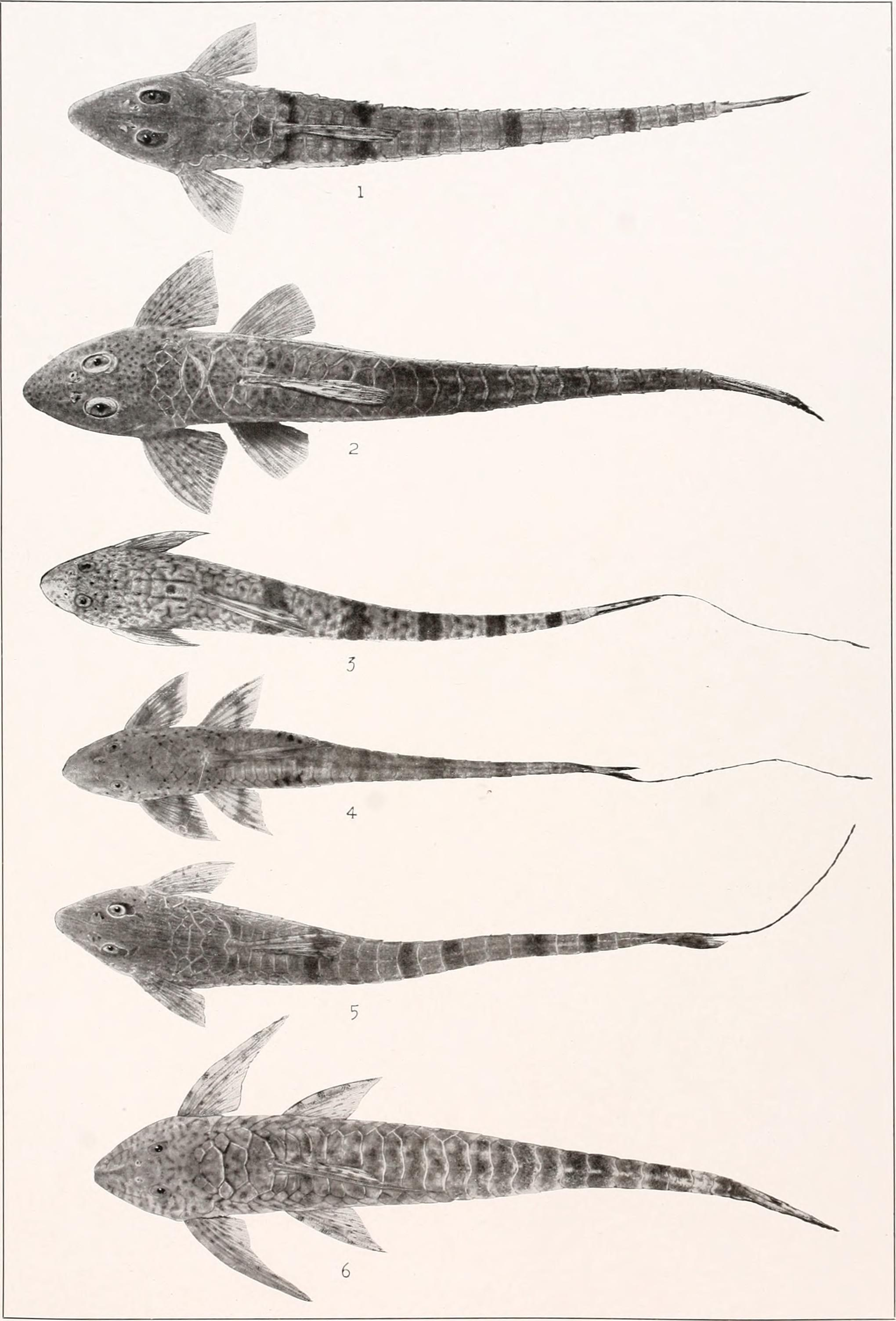
The loricariid labeled with the number 3 in this image is a specimen of Loricariichthys brunneus.

Loricariichthys brunneus, is a species of freshwater ray-finned fish belonging to the family Loricariidae, the suckermouth armored catfishes, and the subfamily Loricariinae, the mailed catfishes. This catfish is found in the basin of the Orinoco in Colombia ans Venezuela, records from Guyana, Peru and Suriname require confirmation. L. brunneus reaches a maximum standard length of 31.5 cm (12.4 in) and is thought to be a facultative air breather. A species of parasitic nematode in the family Guyanemidae, Guyanema longispiculum, was described in 1996 from the abdominal cavity of L. brunneus specimens.
