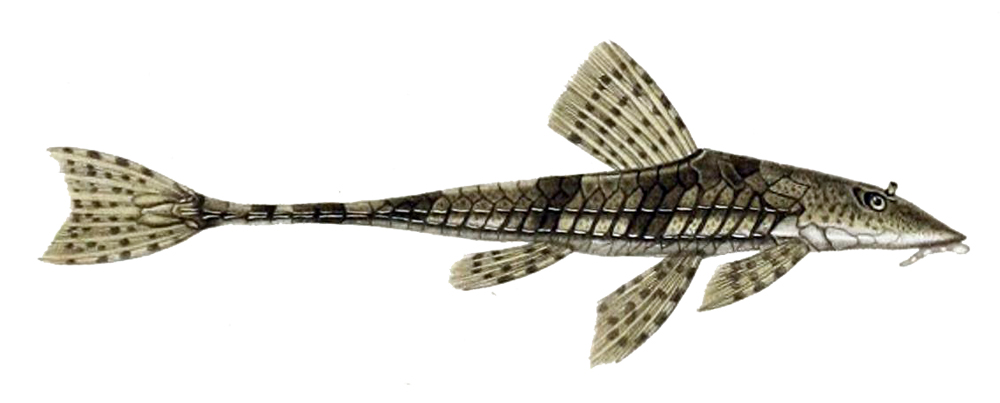

Conservation status
- Least Concern (IUCN 3.1)

Scientific classification
- Kingdom: Animalia
- Phylum: Chordata
- Class: Actinopterygii
- Order: Siluriformes
- Family: Loricariidae
- Genus: Loricariichthys
- Species: L. maculatus

Binomial name
- Loricariichthys maculatus (Bloch, 1794)

Synonyms
- Loricaria maculata Bloch, 1794; Loricaria accipenser Shaw, 1804; Plecostomus cataphracta Gronow, 1854; Loricaria amazomnica Castelnau, 1855; Parahemiodon typus Bleeker, 1862; Loricaria parahemidon Günther, 1864

= Loricariichthys maculatus =

Species of catfish

Loricariichthys maculatus is a species of freshwater ray-finned fish belonging to the family Loricariidae, the suckermouth armored catfishes, and the subfamily Loricariinae, the mailed catfishes. This catfish is widespread in South America, where it has been recorded from Argentina, Bolivia, Brazil, Colombia, Guyana, Paraguay, Peru, Suriname and Venezuela. This species reaches a maximum standard length of 26.3 cm (10.4 in), can weigh up to at least 130.6 g (4.61 oz), and is believed to be a facultative air-breather.
