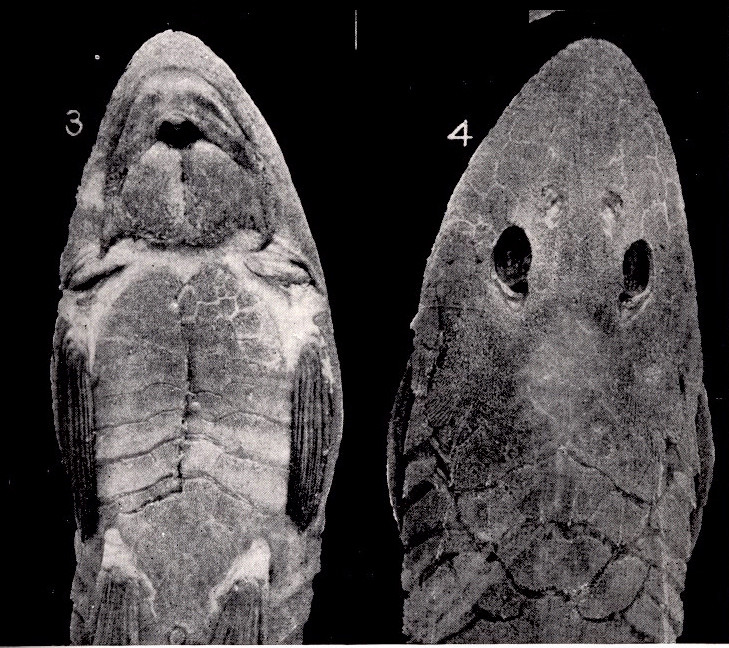

Conservation status
- Least Concern (IUCN 3.1)

Scientific classification
- Kingdom: Animalia
- Phylum: Chordata
- Class: Actinopterygii
- Order: Siluriformes
- Family: Loricariidae
- Genus: Loricariichthys
- Species: L. labialis

Binomial name
- Loricariichthys labialis (Boulenger, 1895)

Synonyms
- Loricaria labialis Boulenger, 1895

= Loricariichthys labialis =

Species of catfish

Loricariichthys labialis is a species of freshwater ray-finned fish belonging to the family Loricariidae, the suckermouth armored catfishes, and the subfamily Loricariinae, the mailed catfishes. This catfish occurs in the basins of the Paraguay River, the middle Paraná River and the lower Uruguay River, in Argentina, Bolivia, Brazil, Paraguay, and Uruguay. It is also known to occur in ponds. This species reaches a maximum standard length of 22 cm (8.7 in) and is thought to be a facultative air breather.
