= Loricariichthys edentatus =

Conservation status
- Least Concern (IUCN 3.1)

Scientific classification
- Kingdom: Animalia
- Phylum: Chordata
- Class: Actinopterygii
- Order: Siluriformes
- Family: Loricariidae
- Genus: Loricariichthys
- Species: L. edentatus

Binomial name
- Loricariichthys edentatus R. E. dos Reis & E. H. L. Pereira, 2000

Species of fish

Loricariichthys edentatus is a species of freshwater ray-finned fish belonging to the family Loricariidae, the suckermouth armored catfishes, and the subfamily Loricariinae, the mailed catfishes. This catfish occurs in the lower Uruguay River basin in Entre Ríos Province in Argentina, and also in Brazil. It has no teeth on the premaxilla, a unique feature in the genus Loricariichthys. This species reaches a maximum standard length of 11.5 cm (4.5 in) and is thought to be a facultative air breather.
