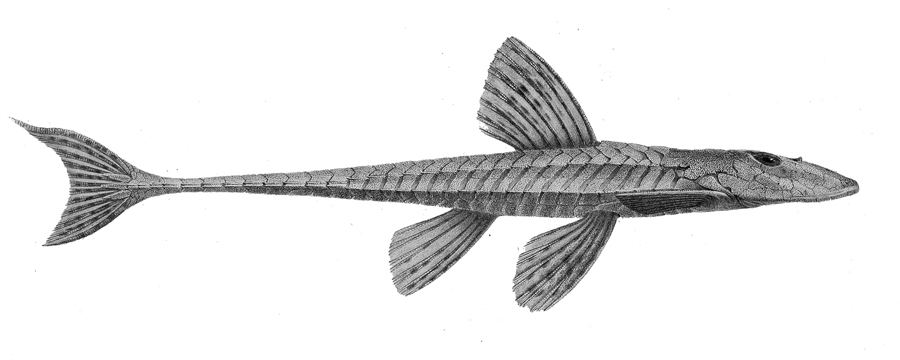

Conservation status
- Least Concern (IUCN 3.1)

Scientific classification
- Kingdom: Animalia
- Phylum: Chordata
- Class: Actinopterygii
- Order: Siluriformes
- Family: Loricariidae
- Genus: Loricariichthys
- Species: L. stuebelii

Binomial name
- Loricariichthys stuebelii (Steindachner, 1882)

Synonyms
- Loricaria stuebelii Steindachner, 1882

= Loricariichthys stuebelii =

Species of catfish

Loricariichthys stuebelii is a species of freshwater ray-finned fish belonging to the family Loricariidae, the suckermouth armored catfishes, and the subfamily Loricariinae, the mailed catfishes. This catfish occurs in the Amazon Basin of Brazil, Colombia and Peru. This species reaches a maximum standard length of 19 cm (7.5 in) and is believed to be a facultative air-breather.
