= Loricariichthys melanurus =

Scientific classification
- Kingdom: Animalia
- Phylum: Chordata
- Class: Actinopterygii
- Order: Siluriformes
- Family: Loricariidae
- Genus: Loricariichthys
- Species: L. melanurus

Binomial name
- Loricariichthys melanurus Reis, Vieira & E. H. L. Pereira, 2021

Species of catfish

Loricariichthys melanurus is a species of freshwater ray-finned fish belonging to the family Loricariidae, the suckermouth armored catfishes, and the subfamily Loricariinae, the mailed catfishes. This catfish is known from two adjacent coastal basins, the Rio Itabapoana and Rio Itapemirim in southern Espírito Santo, Brazil.
