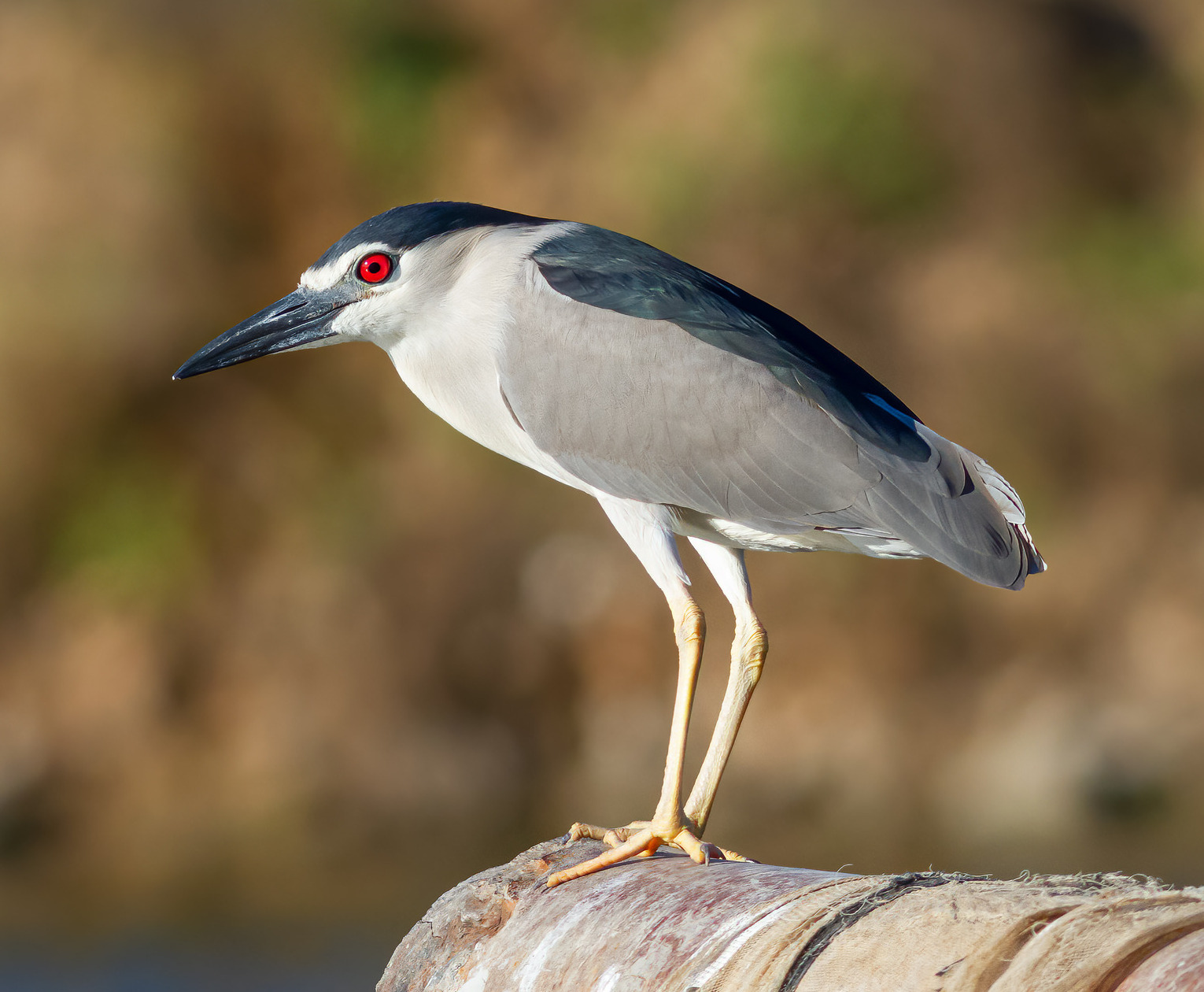
- Nominate N. n. nycticorax in Israel

Conservation status
- Least Concern (IUCN 3.1)

Scientific classification
- Kingdom: Animalia
- Phylum: Chordata
- Class: Aves
- Order: Pelecaniformes
- Family: Ardeidae
- Genus: Nycticorax
- Species: N. nycticorax

Binomial name
- Nycticorax nycticorax (Linnaeus, 1758)
- Range of N. nycticorax Breeding range Year-round range Wintering range

Synonyms
- Ardea nycticorax Linnaeus, 1758

= Black-crowned night heron =

Black-crowned night heron Temporal range: Late Pleistocene–Recent

Species of bird

The black-crowned night heron (Nycticorax nycticorax) or black-capped night heron, commonly shortened to just night heron in Eurasia, is a medium-sized heron found throughout a large part of the world, including parts of Africa, Asia, Europe, and North and South America. In Australasia it is replaced by the closely related Nankeen night heron (N. caledonicus), with which it has hybridised in the area of contact.

== Taxonomy and name ==
The black-crowned night heron was formally described by the Swedish naturalist Carl Linnaeus in 1758 in the tenth edition of his Systema Naturae. He placed it with herons, cranes and egrets in the genus Ardea and coined the binomial name Ardea nycticorax, based on specimens from southern Europe. It is now placed in the genus Nycticorax that was described in 1817 by the English naturalist Thomas Forster for this species. The epithet nycticorax is from Ancient Greek and combines nux, nuktos meaning "night" and korax meaning "raven". The word was used by authors such as Aristotle and Hesychius of Miletus for a "bird of ill omen", perhaps an owl. The word was used by the Swiss naturalist Conrad Gessner in 1555 and then by subsequent authors for a black-crowned night heron.

Four subspecies are accepted:

- N. n. nycticorax (Linnaeus, 1758) – Eurasia south to Africa and Madagascar and east to east Asia, Philippines and Indonesian Archipelago
- N. n. hoactli (Gmelin, 1789) – southern Canada to northern Argentina and northern Chile; Hawaii
- N. n. obscurus (Bonaparte, 1855) – central and southern Chile and southwest Argentina
- N. n. falklandicus (Hartert, EJO, 1914) – Falkland Islands

In the Falkland Islands, the bird is called quark, which is an onomatopoeia similar to its name in many other languages, like qua-bird in English, kwak in Dutch and West Frisian, kvakoš noční in Czech, квак in Ukrainian, кваква in Russian, vạc in Vietnamese, ខ្វែក (kvaik) in Khmer, kowak-malam in Indonesian, hoactli ("wactli") in Nahuatl (cf. the scientific name of the New World subspecies), and waqwa in Quechua.

Fossils attributed to this species have been reported from Late Pleistocene deposits on Great Abaco Island in the Bahamas.

== Description ==
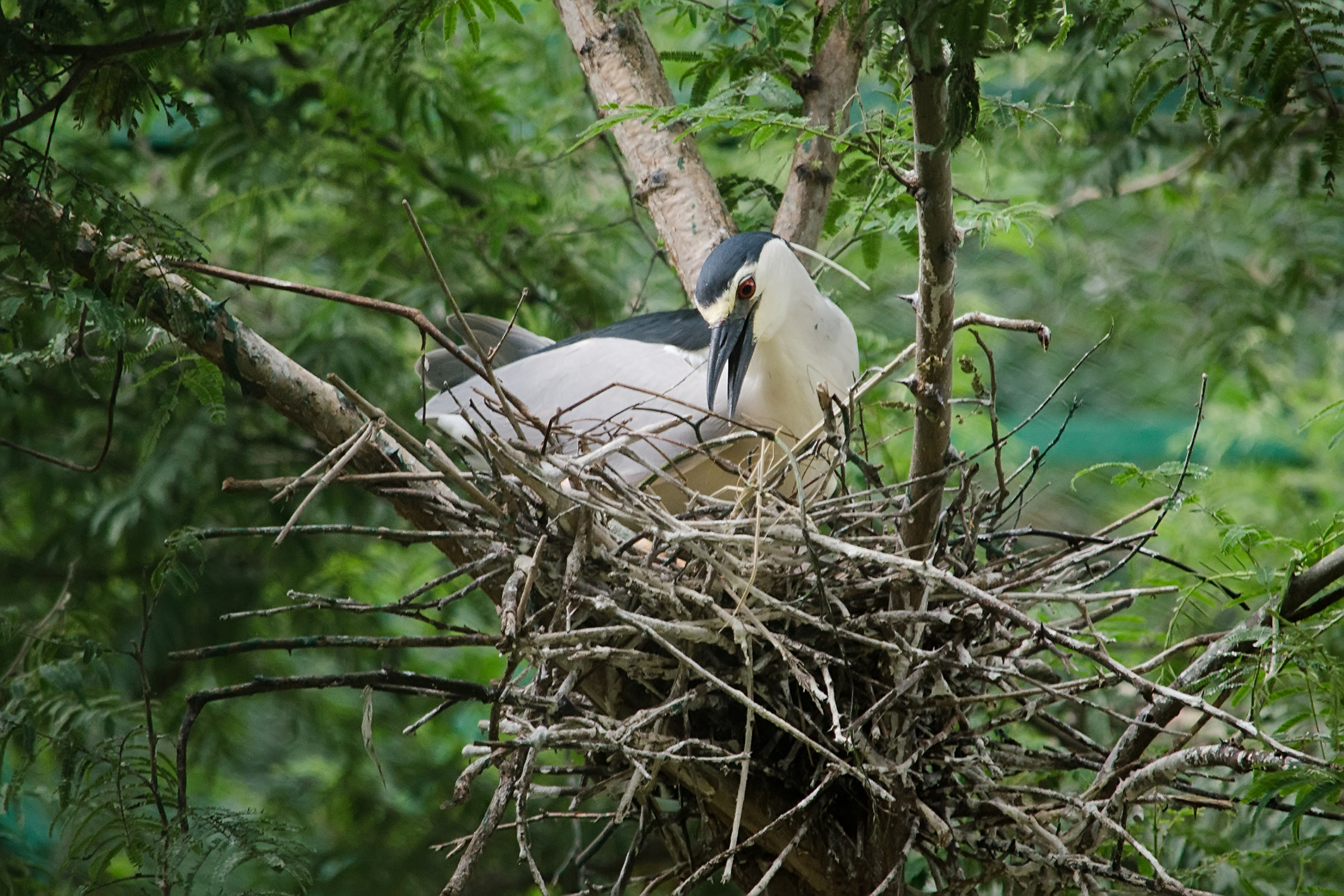
At nest

Adults have a black crown and back with the remainder of the body white or grey, red eyes, and short yellow legs. They have pale grey wings and white under parts. One to eight (mostly two to four) long slender white plumes, erected in greeting and courtship displays, extend from the back of the head. The sexes are similar in appearance although the males are slightly larger. Black-crowned night herons do not fit the typical body form of the heron family. They are relatively stocky with shorter bills, legs, and necks than their more familiar cousins, the egrets and "day" herons. Their resting posture is normally somewhat hunched but when hunting they extend their necks and look more like other wading birds. For a short period during courtship at the start of the nesting season, the legs of adults turn bright salmon-pink, and the bare skin around the eyes blue.

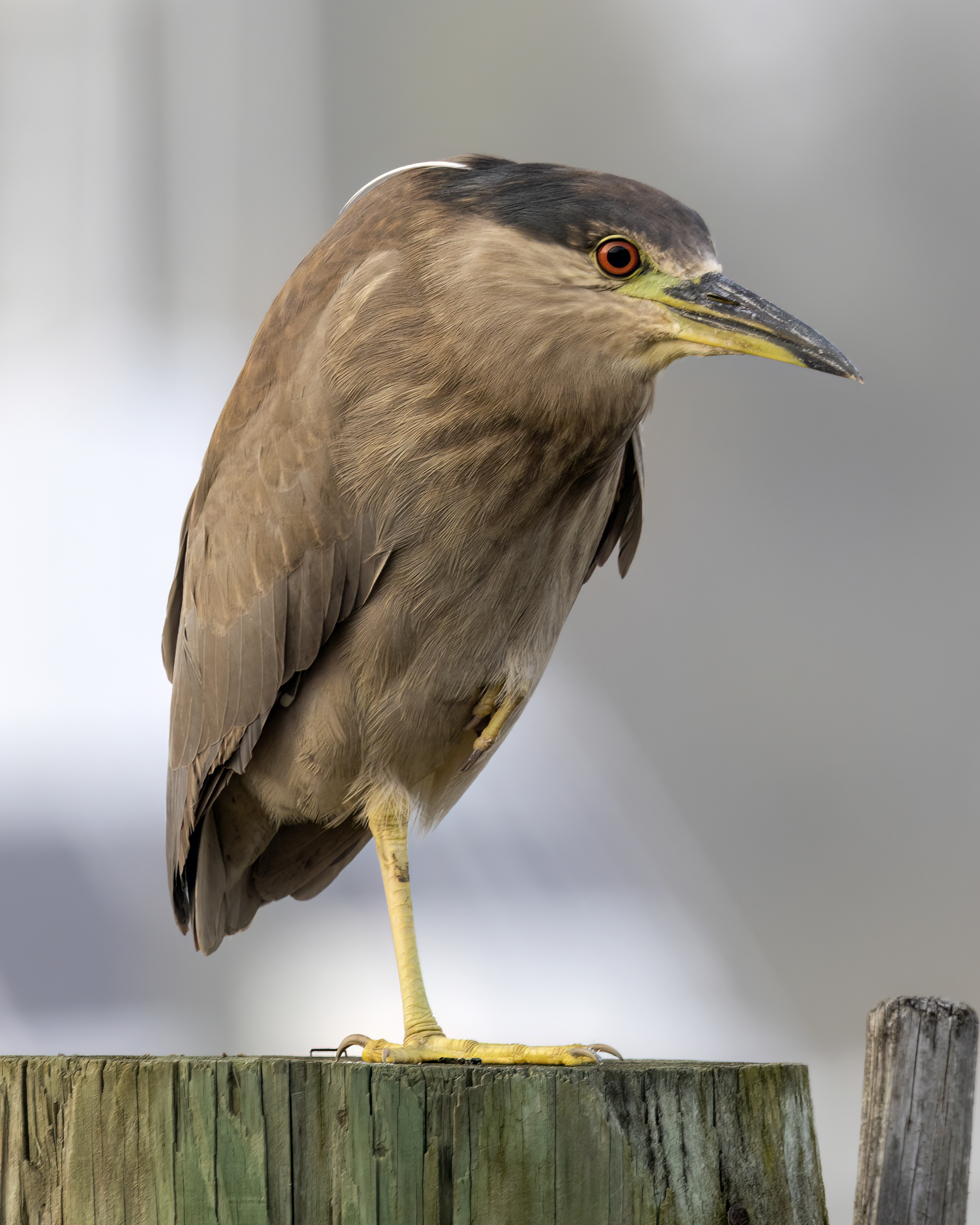
Adult black-crowned night heron of subspecies N. n. obscurus showing grey plumage

The subspecies differ little; nominate N. n. nycticorax and N. n. hoactli are particularly similar in plumage (some authors have considered N. n. hoactli a synonym of the nominate), but the latter is on average slightly larger. N. n. obscurus is the most distinctive subspecies, clearly darker than N. n. hoactli from further north in South America, but N. n. falklandicus is intermediate, with both paler and darker individuals occurring.

Immature birds have dull grey-brown plumage on their heads, wings, and backs, with numerous pale "teardrop" spots. Their underparts are paler and streaked with brown. Second and third year birds attain plumages increasingly similar to adults, but lacking the white head plumes. The young birds have orange eyes and duller yellowish-green legs. They are very noisy birds in their nesting colonies, with calls that are commonly transcribed as quok or woc.

Measurements
	N. n. nycticorax	N. n. hoactli
Length	58–65 cm (23–26 in)	58–66 cm (22.8–26 in)
Weight	male 600–800 g (21–28 oz) female 520–700 g (18–25 oz)	730–1,010 g (25.6–35.8 oz)
Wingspan	105–112 cm (41–44 in)	115–118 cm (45.3–46.5 in)
Ref.		

== Distribution ==
The breeding habitat is fresh and salt-water wetlands throughout much of the world. The nominate subspecies N. n. nycticorax breeds in Europe, Asia and Africa, subspecies N. n. hoactli in North and South America from Canada as far south as northern Argentina and Chile, N. n. obscurus in southernmost South America, and N. n. falklandicus in the Falkland Islands. Black-crowned night herons nest in colonies on platforms of sticks in a group of trees, or on the ground in protected locations such as islands or reedbeds. Three to eight eggs are laid.

This heron is migratory in the northern parts of its range, but is otherwise resident (even in the cold Patagonia). European birds winter in Africa (with a few staying in southern Spain), central and east Asian birds winter in southern Asia, and North American birds winters in Mexico, the southern United States, Central America, and the West Indies.

A colony of the herons has regularly summered at the National Zoo in Washington, D.C., for more than a century. The birds also prominently live year-round in the shores around the San Francisco Bay, with the largest rookery in Oakland. Their ever presence at Oakland's Lake Merritt and throughout the city's downtown area, as well as their resilience to the urban environment and displacement efforts, have led to them being named Oakland's official city bird.

=== Status in Great Britain ===
There are two archaeological specimens of the black-crowned night heron in Great Britain. The oldest is from the Roman London Wall and the more recent from the Royal Navy's late medieval victualling yards in Greenwich. It appears in the London poulterers' price lists as the Brewe, a bird which was thought to have been the Eurasian whimbrel or glossy ibis, which has now been shown to refer to the black-crowned night heron, derived from the medieval French Bihoreau. Black-crowned night heron may have bred in the far wetter and wider landscape of pre-modern Britain. They were certainly imported for the table so the bone specimens themselves do not prove they were part of the British avifauna. In modern times the black-crowned night heron is a vagrant (excluding the feral breeding colonies that were established at Edinburgh Zoo from 1950 into the start of the 21st century and at Great Witchingham in Norfolk, where there were eight pairs in 2003 but breeding was not repeated subsequently). A pair of adults were seen with two recently fledged juveniles in Somerset in 2017, which is the first proven breeding record of wild black-crowned night herons in Great Britain.

== Behaviour ==
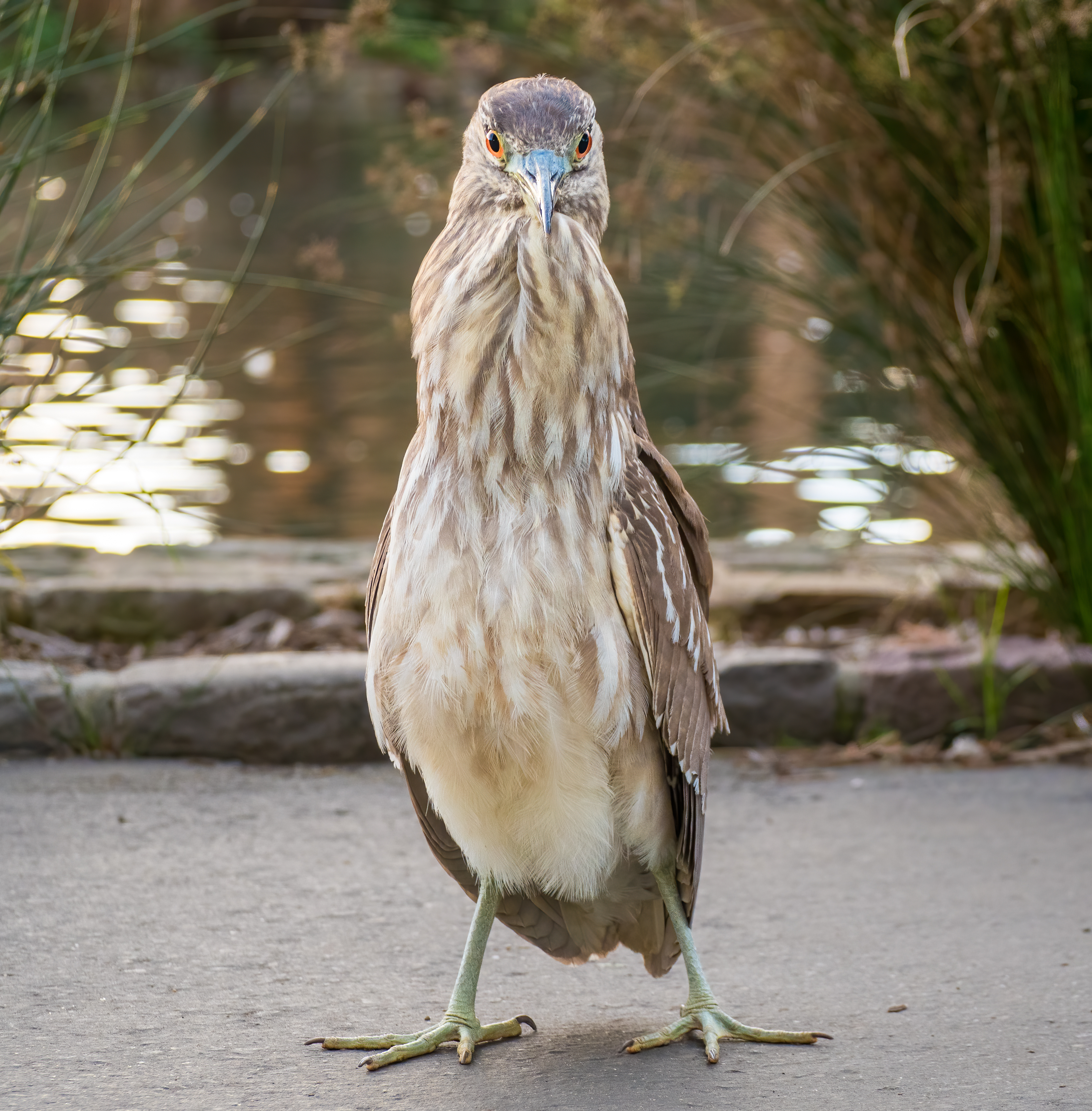
Juvenile in an "upright" threat display

These birds stand still at the water's edge and wait to ambush prey, mainly at night, early morning or evening. They primarily eat small fish, leeches, earthworms, mussels, squid, crustaceans (such as crayfish), frogs, other amphibians, aquatic insects, terrestrial insects, lizards, snakes, small mammals (such as rodents), small birds, eggs, carrion, plant material, and garbage and refuse at landfills. They are among the seven heron species observed to engage in bait fishing; luring or distracting fish by tossing edible or inedible buoyant objects into water within their striking range – a rare example of tool use among birds. During the day they rest in dense trees or bushes. N. n. hoactli is more gregarious outside the breeding season than the nominate race.

== Parasites ==
A thorough study performed by J. Sitko and P. Heneberg in the Czech Republic in 1962–2013 suggested that the central European black-crowned night herons host eight helminth species. The dominant species consisted of Neogryporhynchus cheilancristrotus (62% prevalence), Contracaecum microcephalum (55% prevalence) and Opistorchis longissimus (10% prevalence). The mean number of helminth species recorded per host individual reached 1.41. In Ukraine, other helminth species are often found in black-crowned night herons too, including Echinochasmus beleocephalus, Echinochasmus ruficapensis, Clinostomum complanatum and Posthodiplostomum cuticola.

== Gallery ==
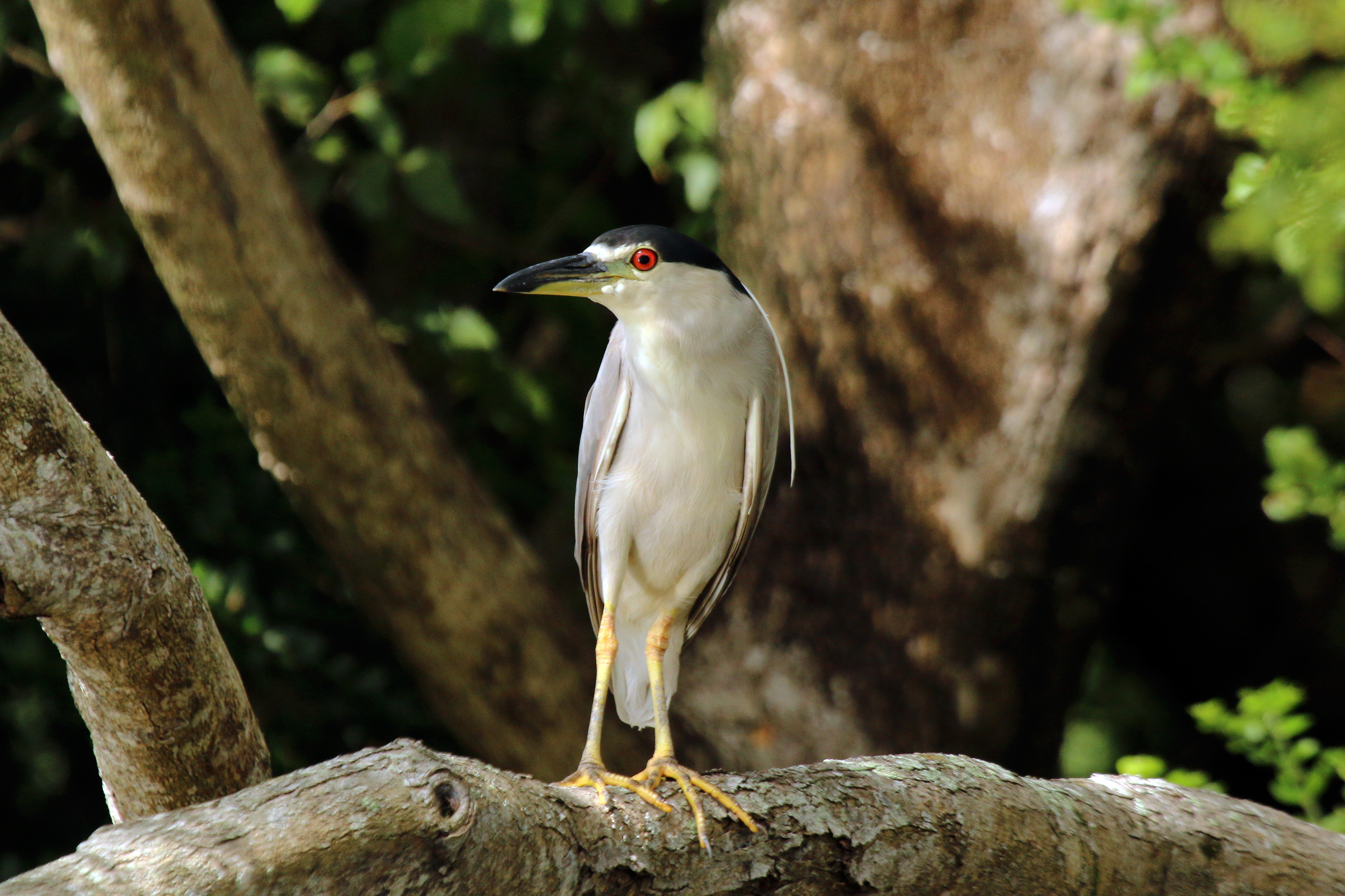
N. n. hoactli, Tobago

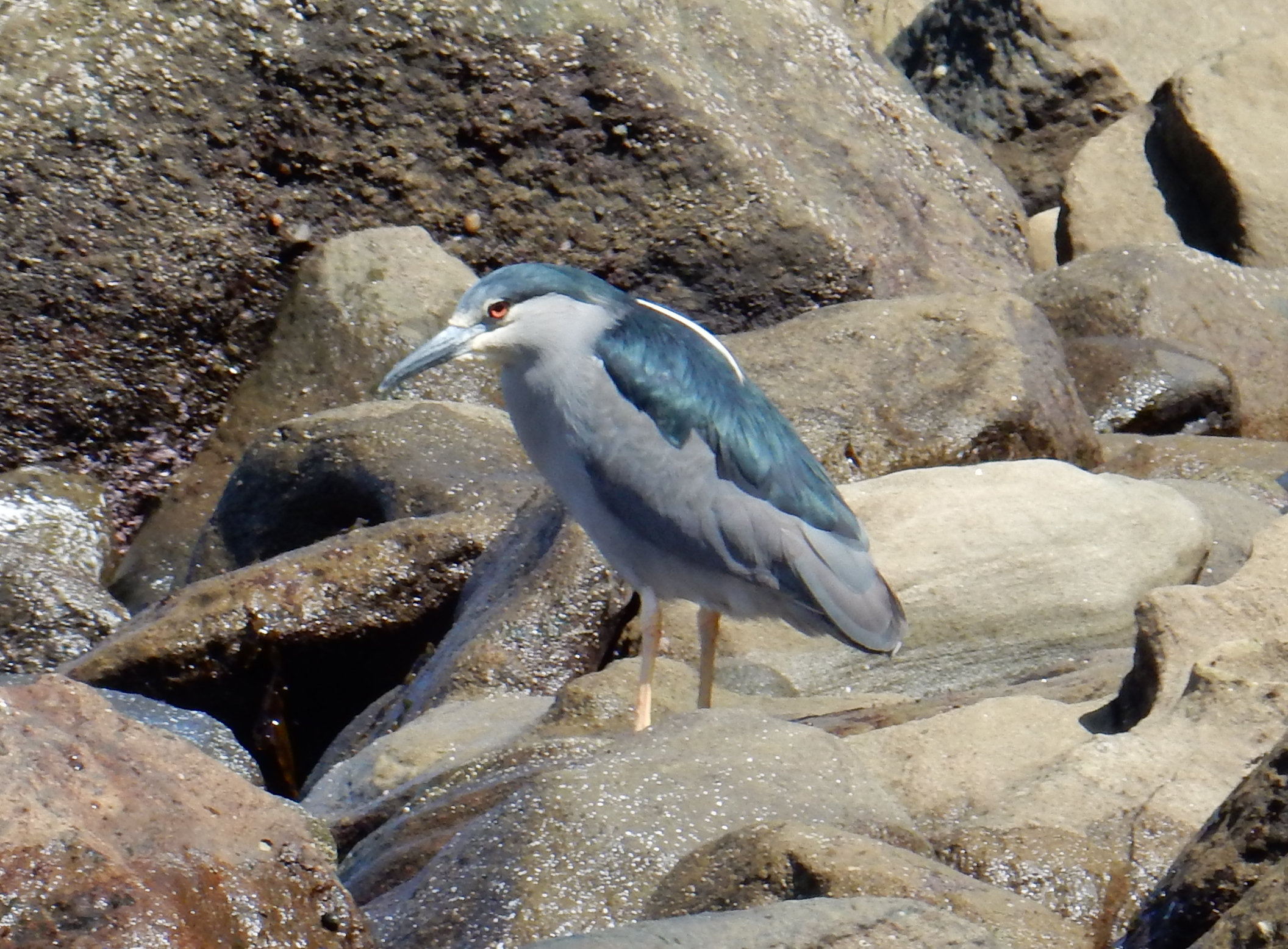
N. n. obscurus, Tomé, southern Chile

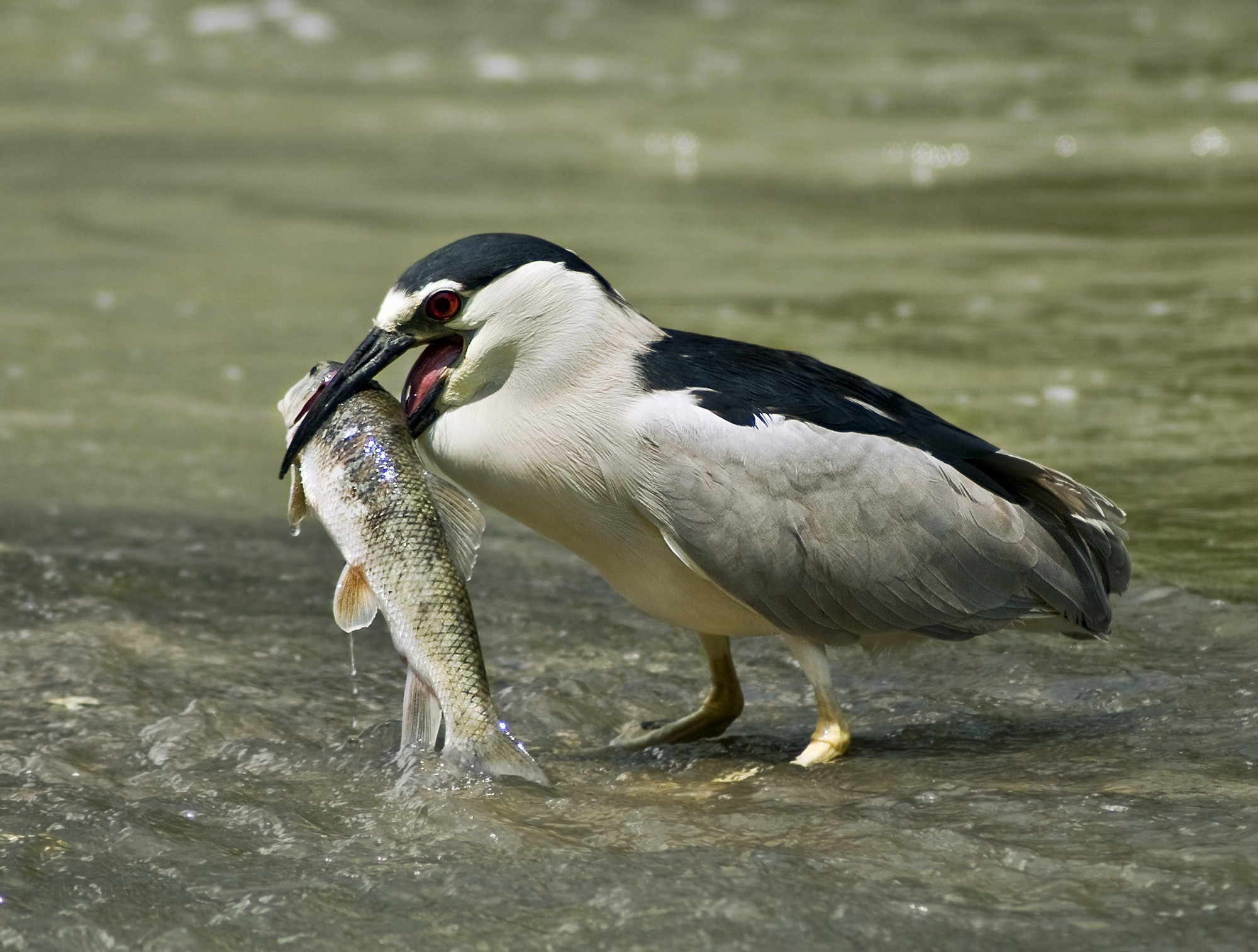
Feeding

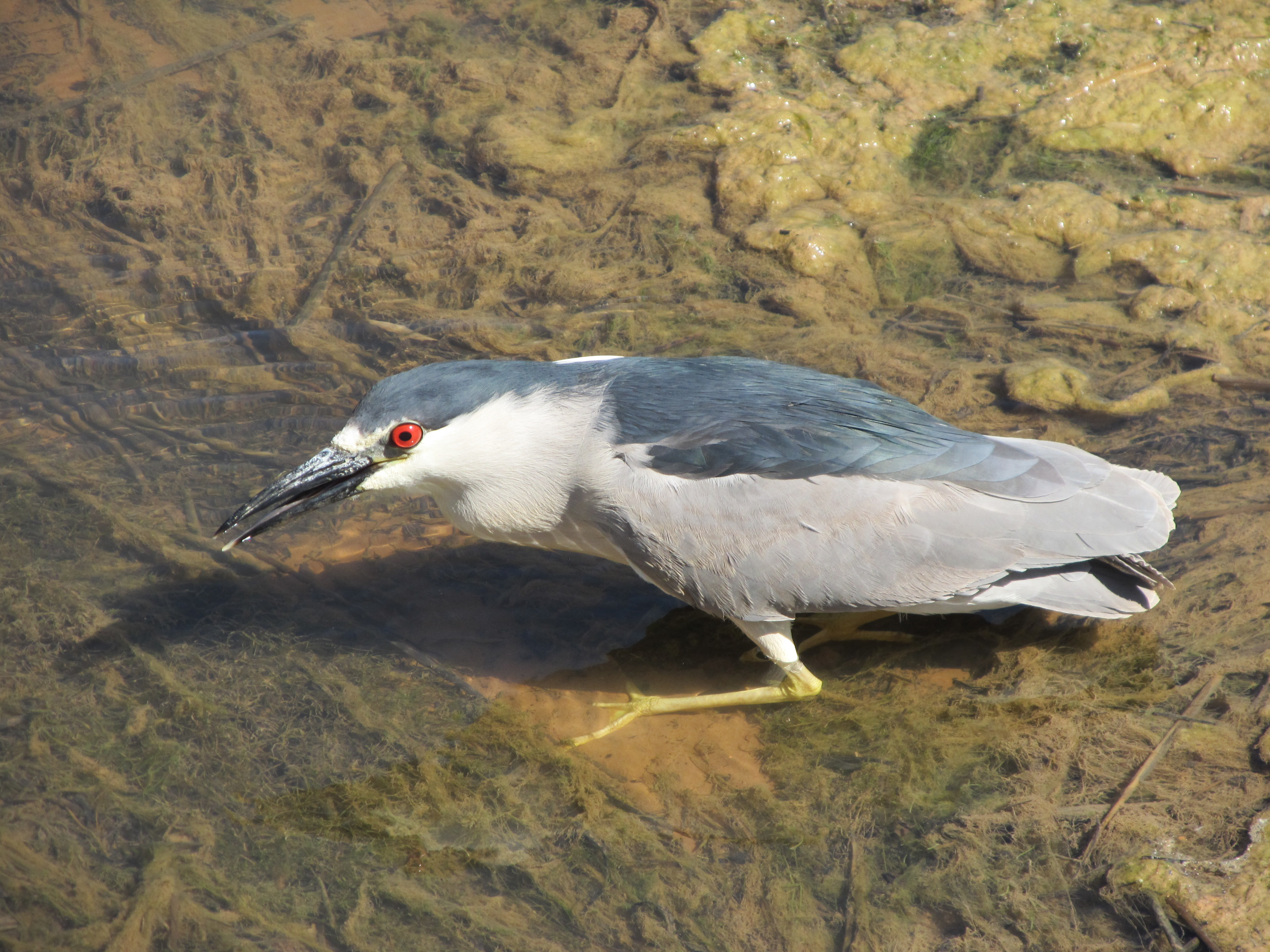
Wading, Arches National Park, Utah

immature, Egypt

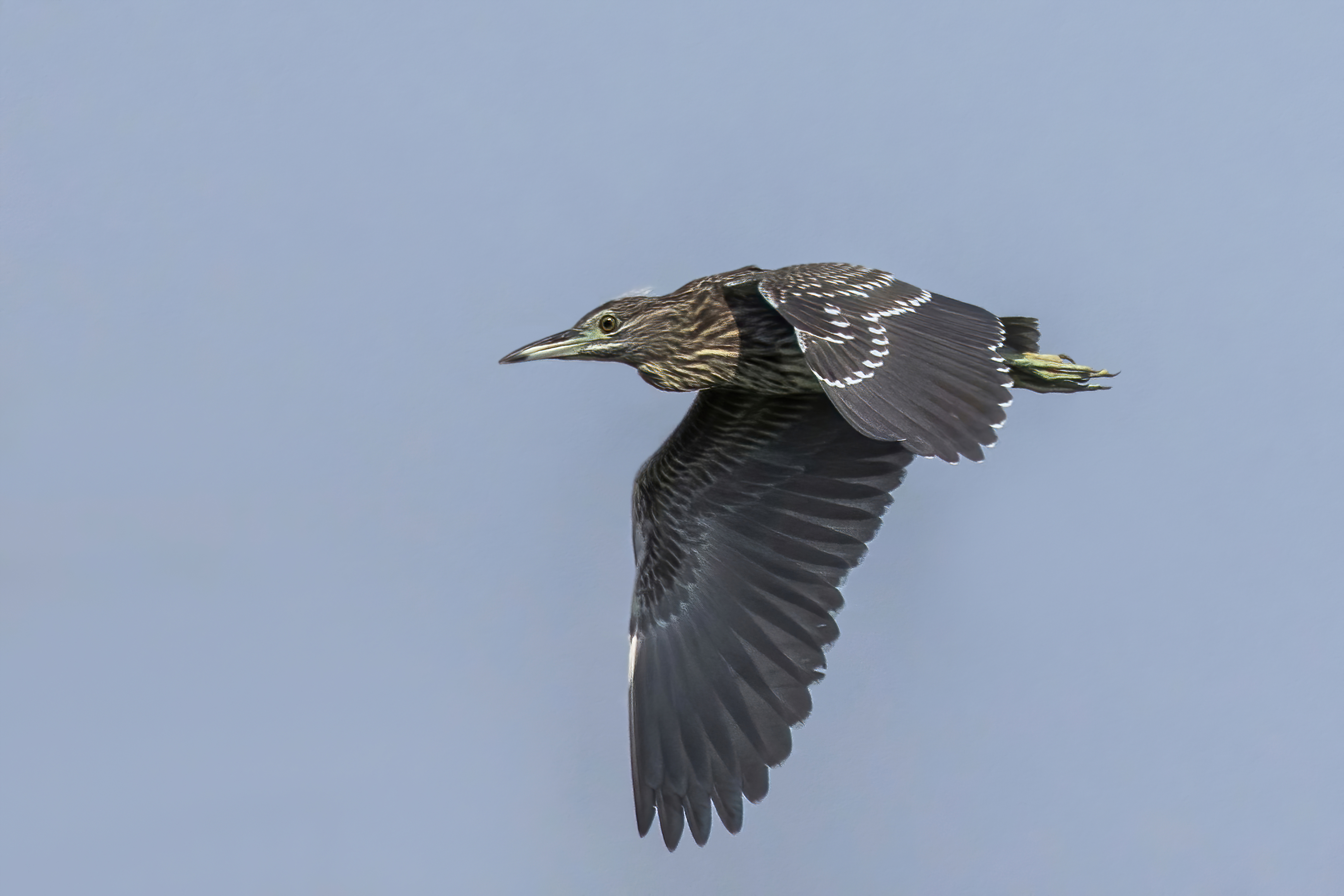
Juvenile in flight, Cyprus

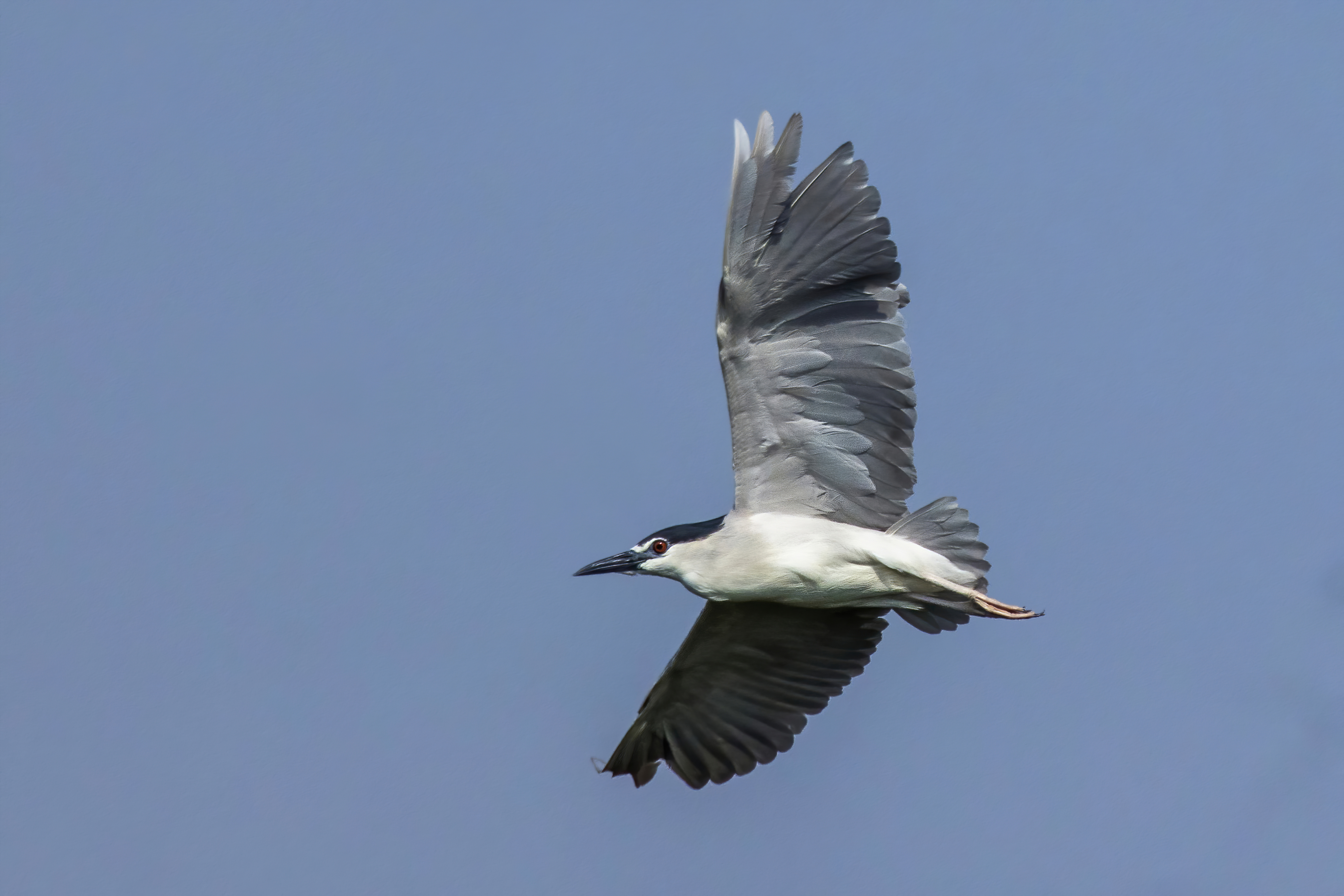
Adult in flight, Cyprus

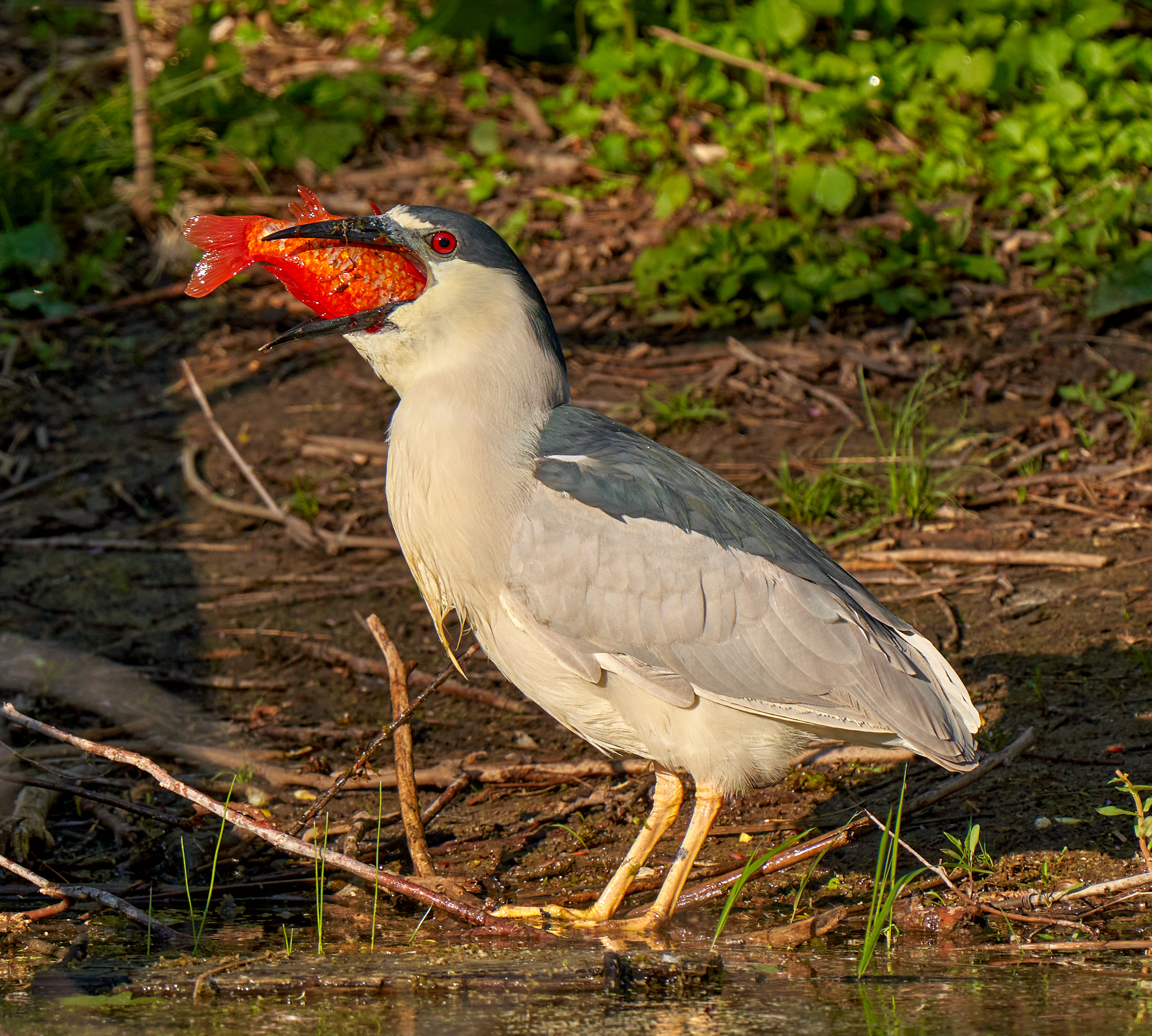
Eating a goldfish, Toronto

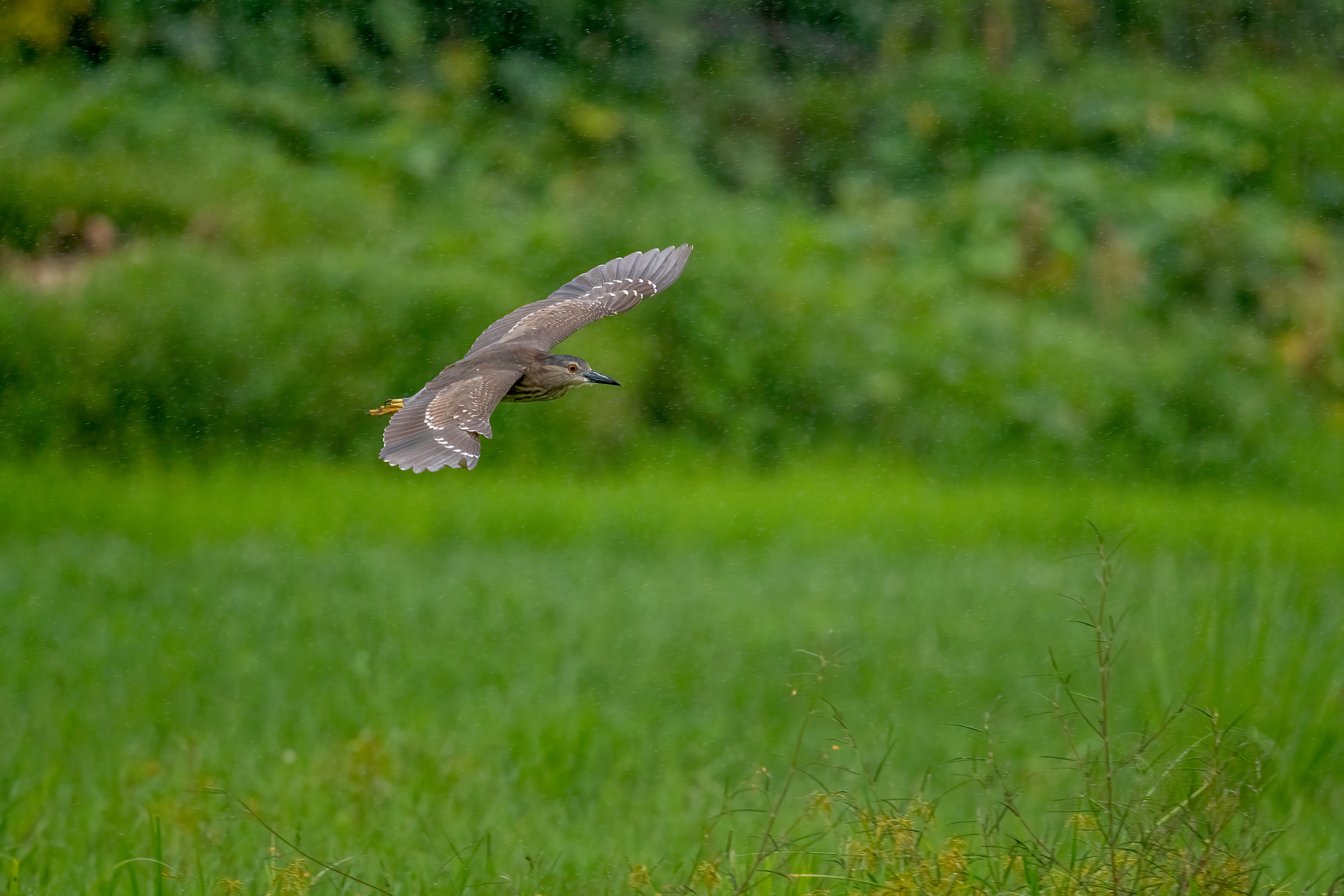
Juvenile in flight, Nepal

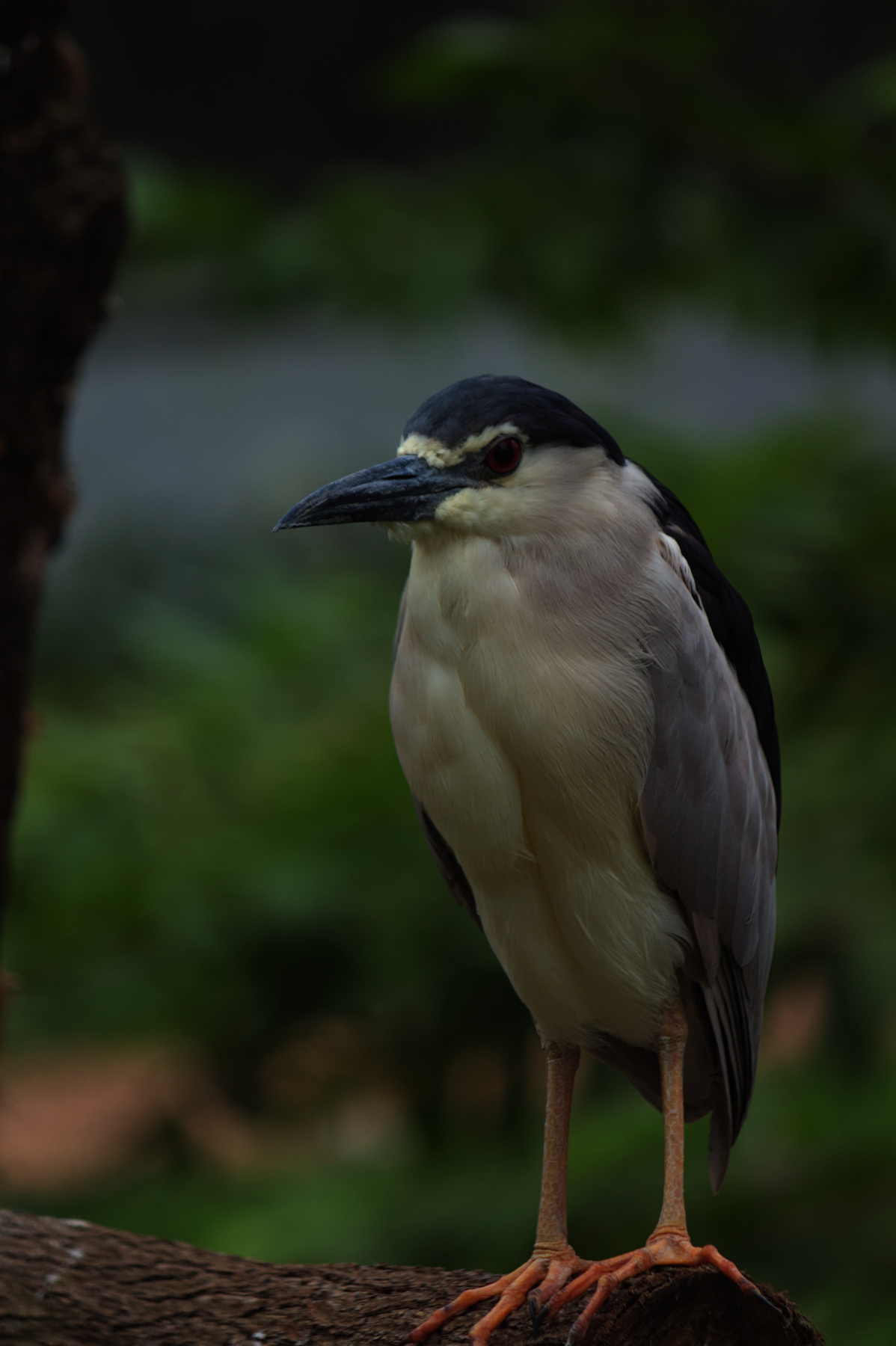
Black-crowned Night Heron, close-up, India

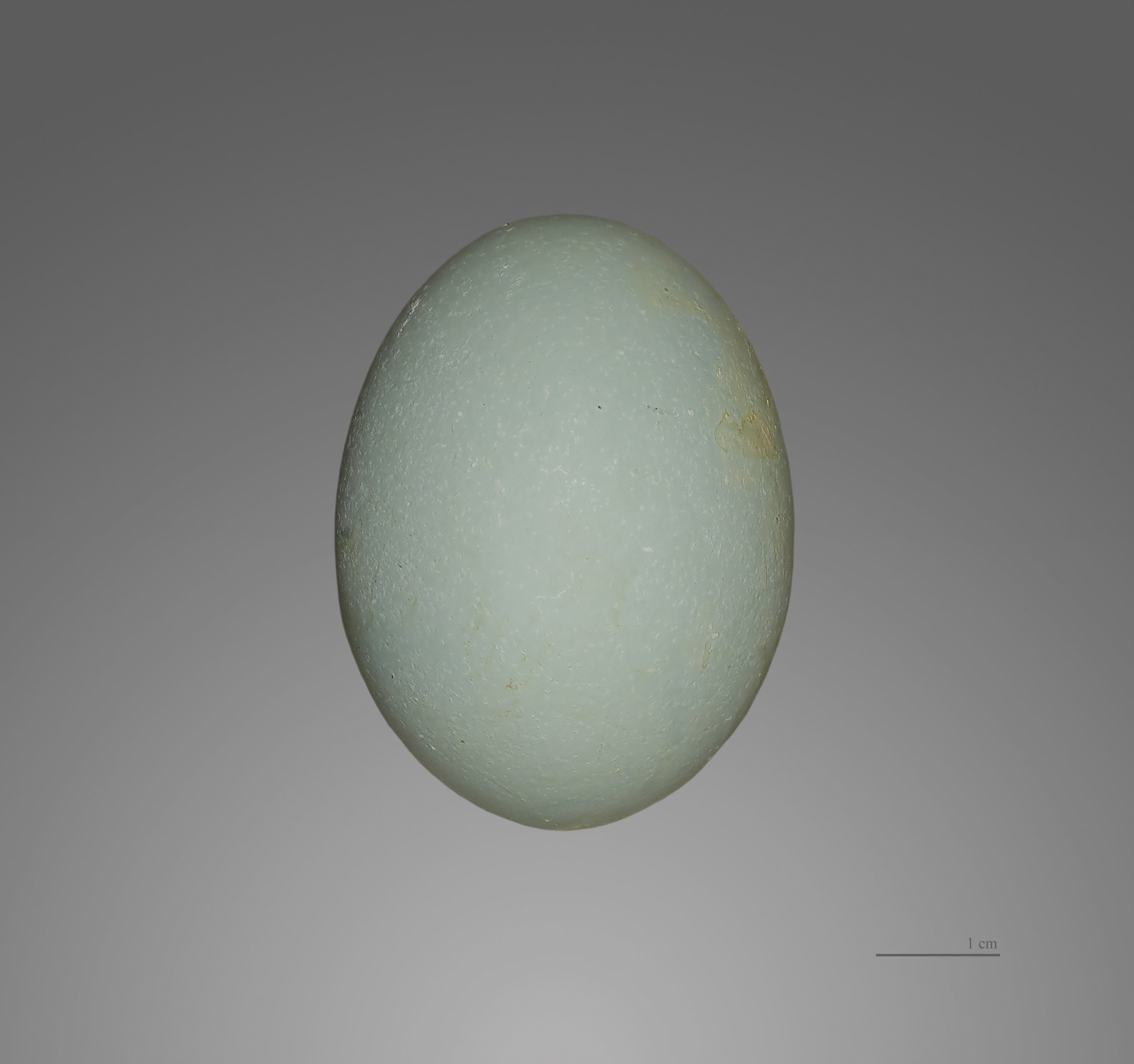
Egg
