= Loricariichthys rostratus =

Conservation status
- Least Concern (IUCN 3.1)

Scientific classification
- Kingdom: Animalia
- Phylum: Chordata
- Class: Actinopterygii
- Order: Siluriformes
- Family: Loricariidae
- Genus: Loricariichthys
- Species: L. rostratus

Binomial name
- Loricariichthys rostratus R. E. dos Reis & E. H. L. Pereira, 2000

Species of fish

Loricariichthys rostratus is a species of freshwater ray-finned fish belonging to the family Loricariidae, the suckermouth armored catfishes, and the subfamily Loricariinae, the mailed catfishes. This catfish occurs in the Paraná River basin in Argentina, Brazil, and Paraguay, with its type locality being designated as the Itaipu Dam's reservoir. This species reaches a maximum standard length of 27.5 cm (10.8 in) and is believed to be a facultative air-breather.
