= Loricariichthys microdon =

Conservation status
- Least Concern (IUCN 3.1)

Scientific classification
- Kingdom: Animalia
- Phylum: Chordata
- Class: Actinopterygii
- Order: Siluriformes
- Family: Loricariidae
- Genus: Loricariichthys
- Species: L. microdon

Binomial name
- Loricariichthys microdon (C. H. Eigenmann, 1909)

Synonyms
- Loricaria microdon C. H. Eigenmann, 1909

Species of catfish

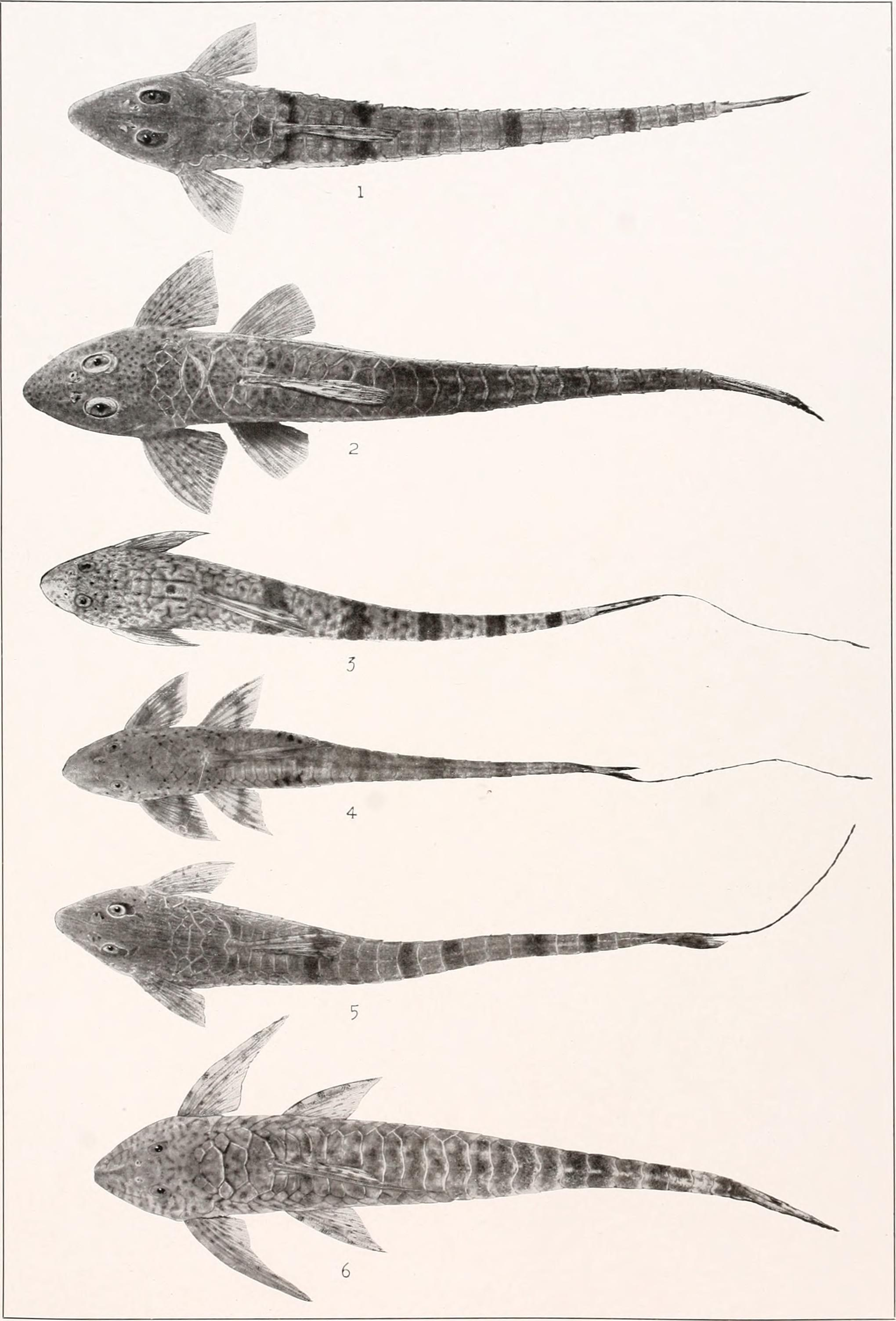
The loricariid labeled with the number 1 in this image is a specimen of Loricariichthys microdon.

Loricariichthys microdon is a species of freshwater ray-finned fish belonging to the family Loricariidae, the suckermouth armored catfishes, and the subfamily Loricariinae, the mailed catfishes. This catfish is endemic to Guyana where it occurs in the basin of the Rupununi. This species reaches a maximum standard length of 17.6 cm (6.9 in) and is believed to be a facultative air-breather.
