= Loricariichthys derbyi =

Conservation status
- Least Concern (IUCN 3.1)

Scientific classification
- Kingdom: Animalia
- Phylum: Chordata
- Class: Actinopterygii
- Order: Siluriformes
- Family: Loricariidae
- Genus: Loricariichthys
- Species: L. derbyi

Binomial name
- Loricariichthys derbyi Fowler, 1915

Species of catfish

Loricariichthys derbyi, is a species of freshwater ray-finned fish belonging to the family Loricariidae, the suckermouth armored catfishes, and the subfamily Loricariinae, the mailed catfishes. This catfish is endemic to Brazil, where it occurs in the northeast of the country, in the states of Ceará, Maranhão, Piauí, Paraíba and Rio Grande do Norte in the basins of the Itapecuru, Jaguaribe, Maracaçumé, Parnaíba and Pindaré-Mearim. This species reaches a maximum standard length of 24.6 cm (9.7 in), a weight of 161 g (5.7 oz) and is thought to be a facultative air breather. The specific name, derbyi, honours the collector of the holotype, a Mr C. F. Derby.
