= Loricariichthys melanocheilus =

Conservation status
- Least Concern (IUCN 3.1)

Scientific classification
- Kingdom: Animalia
- Phylum: Chordata
- Class: Actinopterygii
- Division: Teleostei
- Order: Siluriformes
- Family: Loricariidae
- Genus: Loricariichthys
- Species: L. melanocheilus

Binomial name
- Loricariichthys melanocheilus R. E. dos Reis & E. H. L. Pereira, 2000

Species of fish

Loricariichthys melanocheilus is a species of freshwater ray-finned fish belonging to the family Loricariidae, the suckermouth armored catfishes, and the subfamily Loricariinae, the mailed catfishes. This catfish is found in the lower Paraná River and Uruguay River basins in Argentina, Brazil, Paraguay and Uruguay. This species reaches a maximum standard length of 43 cm (17 in) and is believed to be a facultative air-breather.
