= Loricariichthys cashibo =

Conservation status
- Data Deficient (IUCN 3.1)

Scientific classification
- Kingdom: Animalia
- Phylum: Chordata
- Class: Actinopterygii
- Order: Siluriformes
- Family: Loricariidae
- Genus: Loricariichthys
- Species: L. cashibo

Binomial name
- Loricariichthys cashibo (C. H. Eigenmann & W. R. Allen, 1942)

Synonyms
- Loricaria cashibo C. H. Eigenmann & W. R. Allen, 1942

Species of catfish

Loricariichthys cashibo is a species of freshwater ray-finned fish belonging to the family Loricariidae, the suckermouth armored catfishes, and the subfamily Loricariinae, the mailed catfishes. It is endemic to Peru, where it occurs in the upper Amazon River basin. L. cashibo was first formally described as Loricaria cashibo in 1942 by the American ichthyologists Carl H. Eigenmann and William Ray Allen with its type locality given as Lake Cashiboya. This species reaches a maximum standard length of 13 cm (5.1 in) and is thought to be a facultative air breather.
