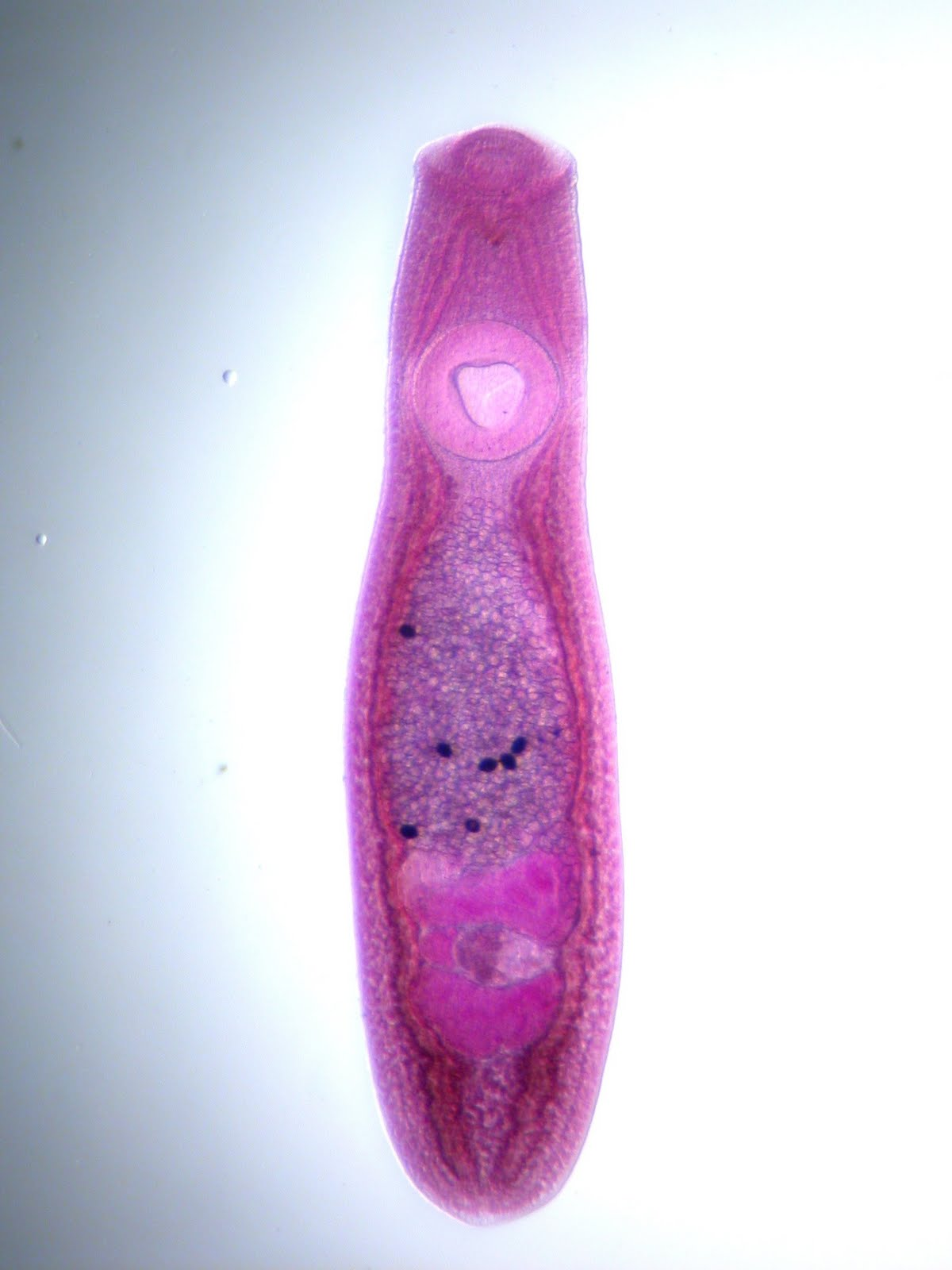
- Clinostomum marginatum

Scientific classification
- Kingdom: Animalia
- Phylum: Platyhelminthes
- Class: Trematoda
- Order: Diplostomida
- Family: Clinostomidae
- Subfamily: Clinostominae
- Genus: Clinostomum; Leidy, 1856

= Clinostomum =

Family of parasitic flatworms

Clinostomum is a genus of trematodes in the order Diplostomida.

== Species ==
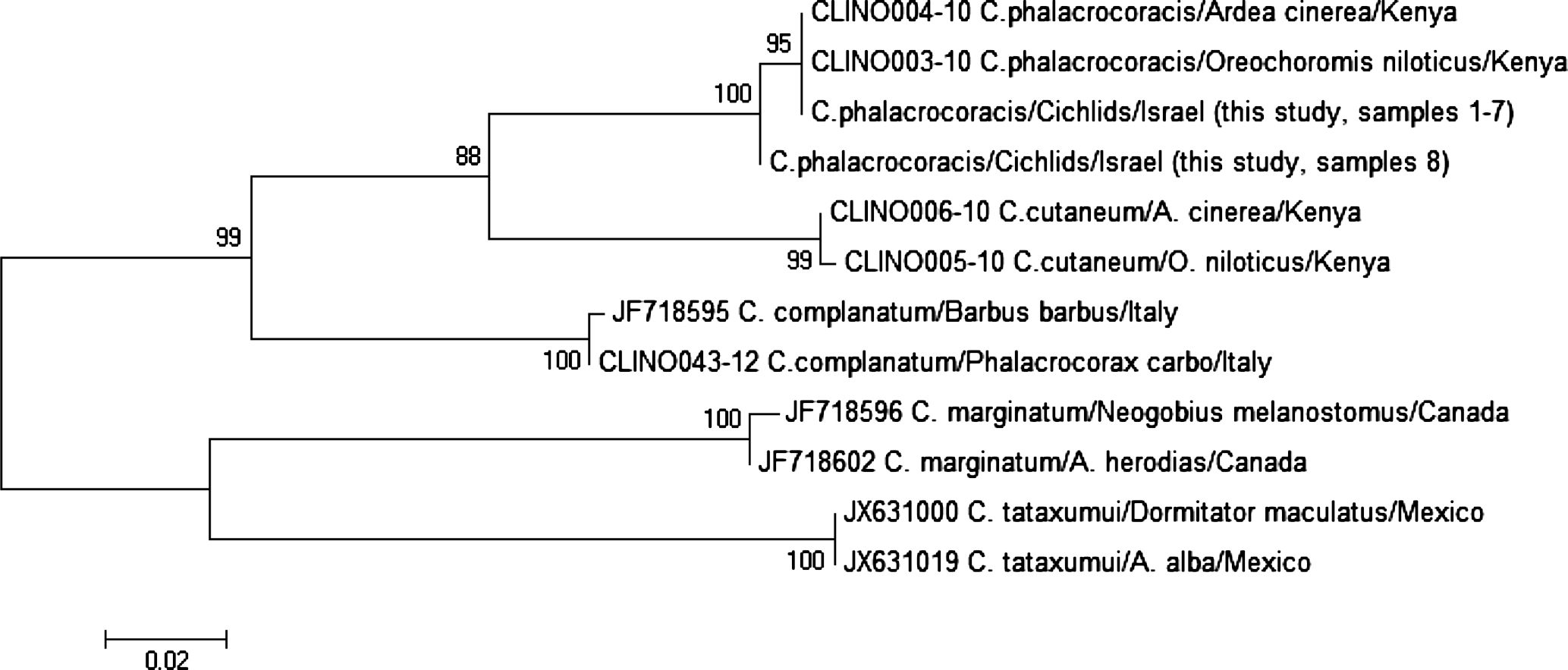
Phylogenetic tree of Clinostomum based on the maximum likelihood estimation method using cytochrome c oxidase subunit I mtDNA sequences

Species include:

- Clinostomum abdoni Tubangui & Garcia, 1939
- Clinostomum africanum Stossich, 1906
- Clinostomum album Rosser, Alberson, Woodyard, Cunningham, Pote & Griffin, 2017
- Clinostomum almaziae Meskal, 1970
- Clinostomum anusi Wesley, 1944
- Clinostomum arquus Sereno-Uribe, García-Varela, Pinacho-Pinacho & Pérez-Ponce de León, 2018
- Clinostomum attenuatum Cort, 1913
- Clinostomum australiense Johnston, 1917
- Clinostomum awadhi Abro, Dharejo, Khan & Birmani, 2016
- Clinostomum caffarae Sereno-Uribe, García-Varela, Pinacho-Pinacho & Pérez-Ponce de León, 2018
- Clinostomum chabaudi Vercammen-Grandjean, 1960
- Clinostomum chrysichthys Dubois, 1930
- Clinostomum cichlidorum Sereno-Uribe, García-Varela, Pinacho-Pinacho & Pérez-Ponce de León, 2018
- Clinostomum complanatum (Rudolphi, 1814) Braun, 1899
- Clinostomum cutaneum Paperna, 1964
- Clinostomum dalagi Tubangui, 1933
- Clinostomum dasi Bhalerao, 1942
- Clinostomum deccanum Jaiswal, 1957
- Clinostomum demiegrettae Jaiswal, 1957
- Clinostomum detruncatum Braun, 1899
- Clinostomum dubium Leidy, 1856
- Clinostomum falsatum Ortlepp, 1963
- Clinostomum fergalliarii Montes, Barneche, Pagano, Ferrari, Martorelli & Pérez-Ponce de León, 2021
- Clinostomum foliiforme Braun, 1899
- Clinostomum gideoni Bhalerao, 1942
- Clinostomum giganticum Agarwal, 1959
- Clinostomum golvani Nassi & Bayssade-Dufour, 1980
- Clinostomum gracile Leidy, 1856
- Clinostomum heluans Braun, 1899
- Clinostomum hornum Nicoll, 1914
- Clinostomum hyderabadensis Jaiswal, 1957
- Clinostomum hylaranae Fischthal & Thomas, 1968
- Clinostomum kalappahi Bhalerao, 1947
- Clinostomum kassimovi Vaidova & Feizullaev, 1958
- Clinostomum lambitans Braun, 1899
- Clinostomum lophophallum Baer, 1933
- Clinostomum lucknowensis Pandey, 1969
- Clinostomum macrosomum Jaiswal, 1957
- Clinostomum magadhatum Singh & Prasad, 1980
- Clinostomum marginatum (Rudolphi, 1819) Braun, 1899
- Clinostomum mastacembeli Jaiswal, 1957
- Clinostomum orientale Mukherjee, 1968
- Clinostomum philippinensis Velasquez, 1960
- Clinostomum piscidium Southwell & Prashad, 1918
- Clinostomum poteae Rosser, Baumgartner, Alberson, Noto, Woodyard, King, Wise & Griffin, 2018
- Clinostomum prashadi Bhalerao, 1942
- Clinostomum progonum Jaiswal, 1957
- Clinostomum pseudoheterostomum Tubangui, 1933
- Clinostomum pusillum Lutz, 1928
- Clinostomum pyriforme Prudhoe, 1957
- Clinostomum schizothoraxi Kaw, 1950
- Clinostomum sindensis Khan & Bilqees, 1986
- Clinostomum sinense Locke, Caffara, Barčák, Sonko, Tedesco, Fioravanti & Li, 2019
- Clinostomum singhi Jaiswal, 1957
- Clinostomum tataxumui Sereno-Uribe, Pinacho-Pinacho, García-Varela & Pérez-Ponce de León, 2013
- Clinostomum tilapiae Ukoli, 1966
- Clinostomum trichogasteri Pandey, 1969
- Clinostomum ukolii Caffara, Locke, Echi, Halajian, Luus-Powell, Benini, Tedesco & Fioravanti, 2020
- Clinostomum vanderhorsti Ortlepp, 1935
- Clinostomum wilsoni Matthews & Cribb, 1998
