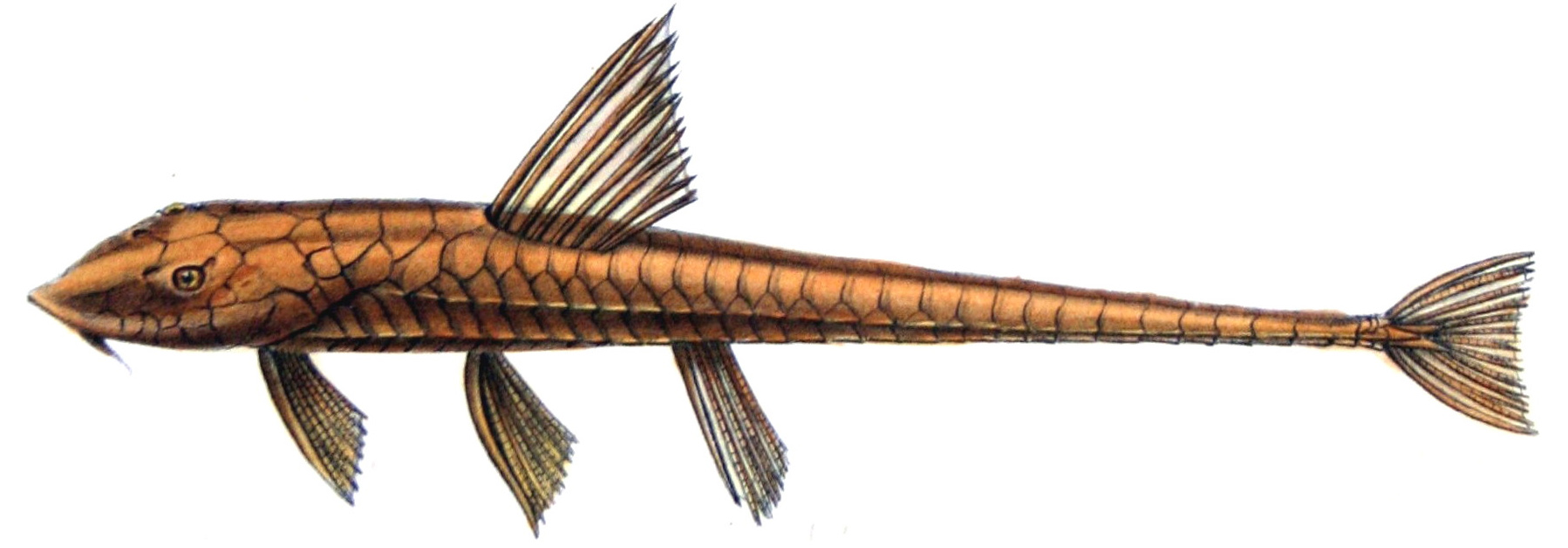

Conservation status
- Least Concern (IUCN 3.1)

Scientific classification
- Kingdom: Animalia
- Phylum: Chordata
- Class: Actinopterygii
- Order: Siluriformes
- Family: Loricariidae
- Genus: Loricariichthys
- Species: L. castaneus

Binomial name
- Loricariichthys castaneus (Castelnau, 1855)

Synonyms
- Loricaria castanea Castelnau, 1855; Loricaria spixii Steindachner, 1881; Loricariichthys spixii (Steindachner 1881)

= Loricariichthys castaneus =

Species of catfish

Loricariichthys castaneus, is a species of freshwater ray-finned fish belonging to the family Loricariidae, the suckermouth armored catfishes, and the subfamily Loricariinae, the mailed catfishes. It is endemic to Brazil, where it occurs in coastal streams in southeastern part of the country, ranging from São Paulo to Espírito Santo, including Minas Gerais, Parańa and Rio de Janeiro, it can also be found in the Paraíba do Sul, Doce and Ribeira de Iguape basins. This species reaches a maximum standard length of 39.6 cm (15.6 in) and is thought to be a facultative air breather.
