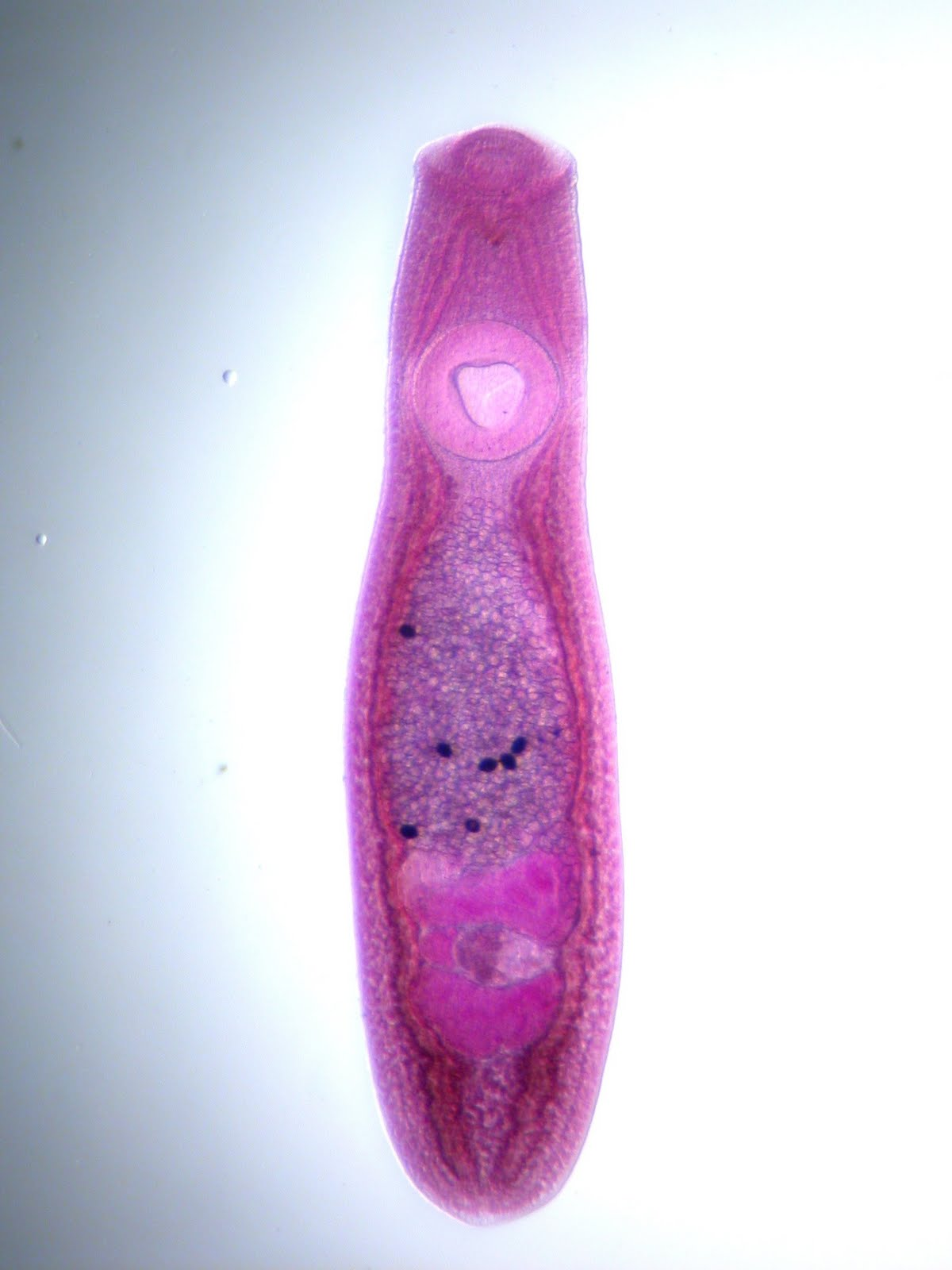
- Clinostomum marginatum

Scientific classification
- Kingdom: Animalia
- Phylum: Platyhelminthes
- Class: Trematoda
- Order: Diplostomida
- Superfamily: Schistosomatoidea
- Family: Clinostomidae; Lühe, 1901

Genera
- Clinostomoides Dollfus, 1950; Clinostomum Leidy, 1856; Euclinostomum Travassos, 1928; Ithyoclinostomum Witenberg, 1925; Nephrocephalus Odhner, 1902

= Clinostomidae =

Family of parasitic flatworms

Clinostomidae is a family of trematodes in the order Diplostomida.
