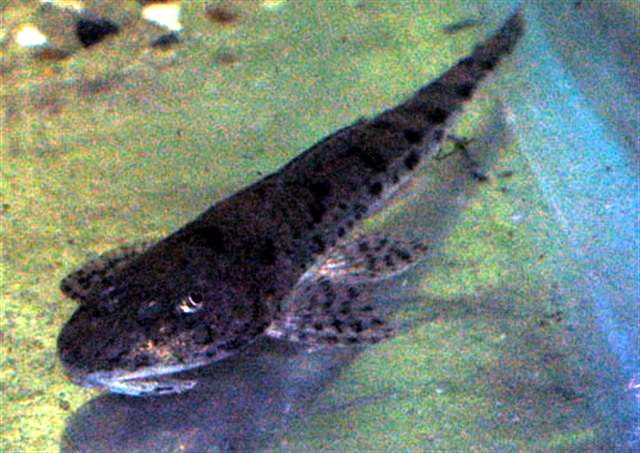

Conservation status
- Least Concern (IUCN 3.1)

Scientific classification
- Kingdom: Animalia
- Phylum: Chordata
- Class: Actinopterygii
- Order: Siluriformes
- Family: Loricariidae
- Genus: Loricariichthys
- Species: L. platymetopon

Binomial name
- Loricariichthys platymetopon Isbrücker & Nijssen, 1979

= Loricariichthys platymetopon =

Species of catfish

Loricariichthys platymetopon is a species of freshwater ray-finned fish belonging to the family Loricariidae, the suckermouth armored catfishes, and the subfamily Loricariinae, the mailed catfishes. This catfish is widespread in South America, where it occurs in the river basins of the Amazon, Paraguay, lower and middle Paraná, and lower and middle Uruguay Rivers in Argentina, Bolivia, Brazil, Paraguay and Uruguay. The species reaches maturity at around 15.7 cm (6.2 in) in length, although it can grow up to a total length of 39 cm (15 in). It can reach at least 311 g (11.0 oz) in weight and is believed to be a facultative air-breather.

Loricariichthys platymetopon is known to have a diploid number of 2n = 54 and a ZW sex-determination system.
