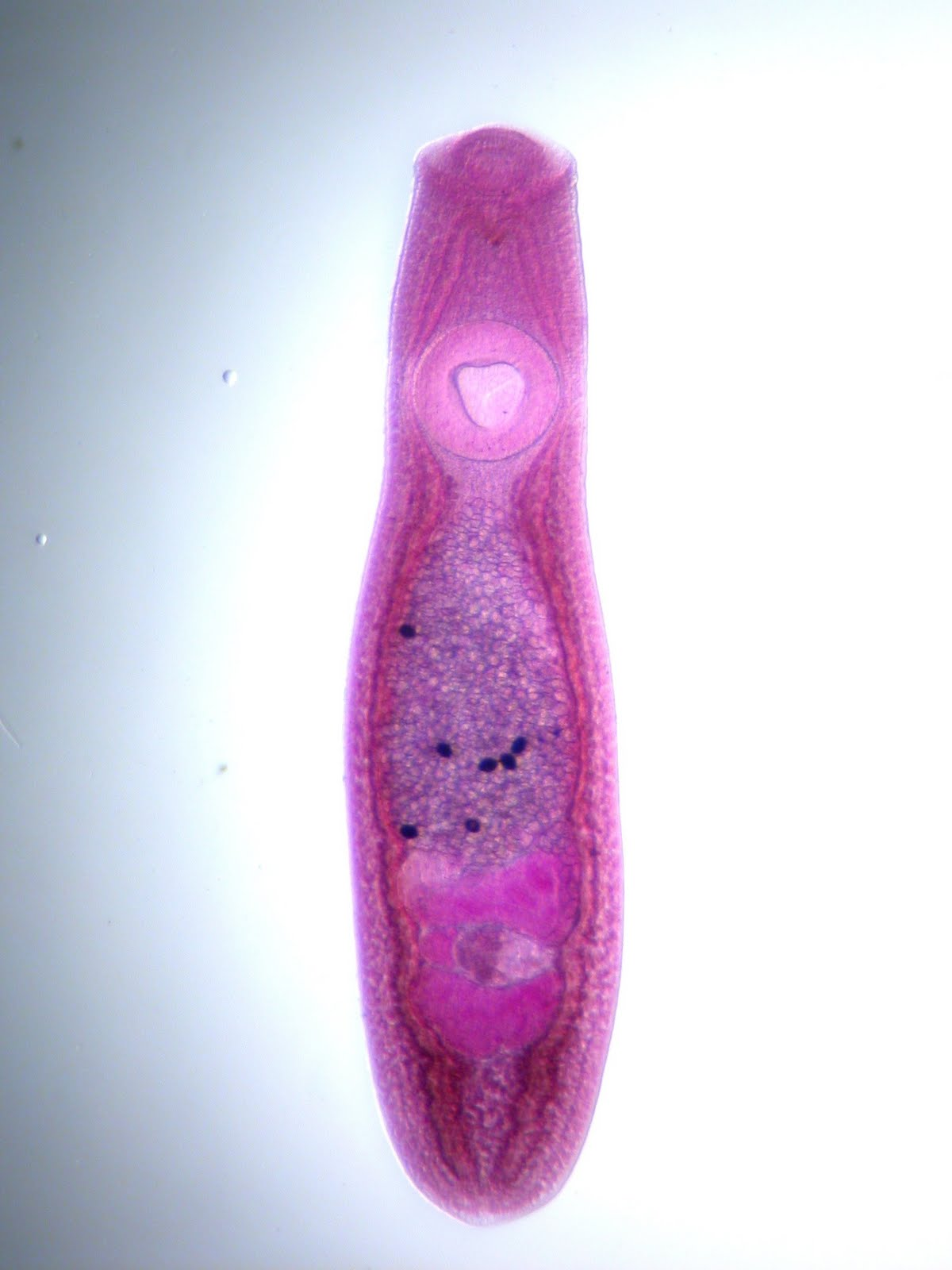

Scientific classification
- Kingdom: Animalia
- Phylum: Platyhelminthes
- Class: Trematoda
- Order: Diplostomida
- Family: Clinostomidae
- Genus: Clinostomum
- Species: C. marginatum

Binomial name
- Clinostomum marginatum (Rudolphi, 1819)

= Clinostomum marginatum =

Species of fluke

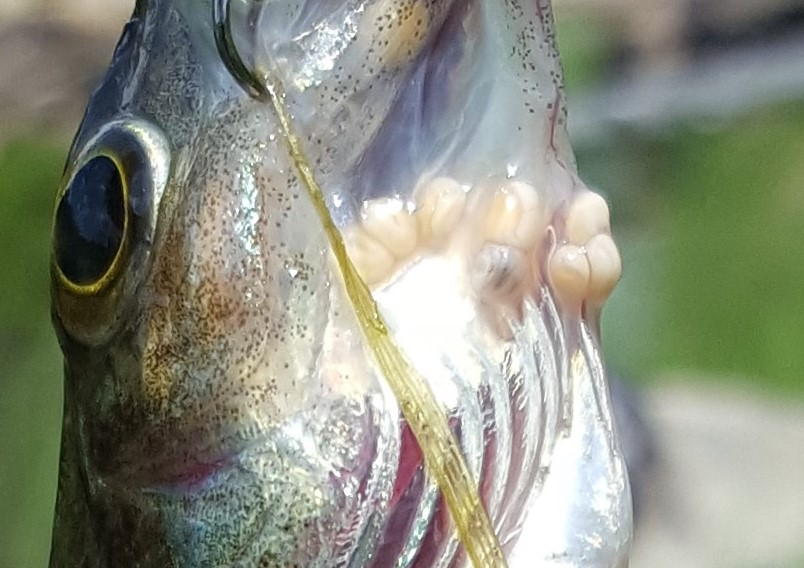
Yellow perch infected with Clinostomum

Clinostomum marginatum is a species of parasitic fluke (class Trematoda). It is commonly called the "Yellow grub". It is found in many freshwater fish in North America, and no fish so far is immune to this parasite. It is also found in frogs. Clinostomum marginatum can also be found in the mouth of aquatic birds such as herons and egrets. They are commonly present in the esophagus of fish-eating birds and reptiles. Eggs of these trematodes are shed in the feces of aquatic birds and released into water. Aquatic birds become hosts of this parasite by ingesting infected freshwater fish. The metacercariae are found right beneath the skin or in the muscles of host fish.

The life cycle of the fluke consists of two intermediate hosts and one definitive host. The parasite's eggs hatch in the water and the miracidium invades the foot of a snail. The cercaria leaves the snail and encysts in the muscle of the connective tissue of fresh-water fish species or in the muscle of frogs. The metacercarial stage is that is formed is then referred to as the “yellow grub”. The encysted metacercariae appear yellow, with a slightly oval-shaped spot, and are about 3 to 6 mm long. Metacercariae are common in the caudal, dorsal, and pectoral fins; on the inside surface of the operculum, and in the flesh. The adult trematode is found in the mouth and esophagus of herons and other fish-eating birds.

== Morphology ==
Clinostomum marginatum is a yellow flatworm that can grow up to 6.4 millimetres (0.25 in) in the flesh of freshwater fish or the muscle of frogs. Distinguishing characteristics of this parasite in the "miracidium" stage are three eyespots located on the mid-dorsal line, posterior of lateral papillae. These eyespots are cup-shaped and contain a lens, forming a triangle-shaped appearance on the parasite. They also contain two pairs of flame cells; one pair located on the anterior between the eyespots and lateral papillae and one pair on the posterior side. In addition, they have pairs of large refractive vacuoles, which are found near the flame cells. They differ in structure and physiological phenotypes depending on its habitat. However, specimens found in herons were smooth, had thick teguments, and absorbed food (such as glucose) through facilitated diffusion.

Along with a thick tegument, these flukes were also found to have bacteria on them. The bacteria may play a role in the absorption and metabolism of glucose.

== Life cycle ==
For its life cycle to be complete, Clinostomum marginatum requires two intermediate hosts (snail and fish or frog) and one definitive host (bird). The life cycle begins when eggs hatch in the water. The miracidia swims and invades the foot of a snail of the genus Helisoma. They will die in several hours if they cannot find the snail host. While inside the snail, the miracidia undergo several asexual reproduction and the larvae eventually become cercariae. The cercariae form exits the snail and is free swimming in water, in search for a fitting fish host. They burrow inside the fish or frog host, and the cercariae encyst and continue its next larval stage, known as "metacercariae", which are the yellow grubs. The grubs can live within the host for several years until eaten by a bird host. When the parasitized host is eaten, the grub matures in the throat of the bird. The eggs of the parasite known as a metacercariae are then released into the water through the bird's mouth when feeding and become adult flukes. This completes the life cycle.

== Food source ==
These parasites may feed on the mucus of organs, food content ingested by the host, blood and tissue from eroding epithelial surfaces.
