= Adonis (disambiguation) =

Adonis is a hero in Greek mythology.

Adonis may also refer to:

== Places ==
- Adonis, Missouri, USA
- Adonis, West Virginia, USA
- Adonis River or Abraham River, a river in Lebanon
- 2101 Adonis, a near-Earth asteroid
- Adonis, Lebanon
- Adonis Baths, a waterfall in Cyprus

== People with the name ==
- Adonis (musician) (born 1963), house music pioneer
- Adunis (born 1930), Syrian poet
- Adonxs (born Adam Pavlovčin in 1995), Slovak singer-songwriter

=== Surname ===
- Adrian Adonis or Keith Franke (1954–1988), American professional wrestler
- Andrew Adonis, Baron Adonis (born 1963), British politician
- Ashante Adonis (born 1992), stage name of Tehuti Miles, American wrestler
- Bernard Adonis, a member of the National Assembly of Seychelles
- Chris Adonis (born 1983), one stage name of Christopher Mordetzky, American wrestler
- Darren Adonis (born 1998), South African rugby player
- Frank Adonis (1935–2018), American actor
- Jerome Adonis (born 1972), Filipino labor activist
- Joe Adonis (1902–1971), New York mobster
- Neil Adonis (born 1969), South African baseball player
- Robert Adonis (born 1948), British Guyanese cricketer
- Rochelle Adonis (born 1972), Canadian-Australian chef and television personality
- Sam Adonis (born 1989), stage name of Samuel Polinsky, American wrestler

=== Given name ===
- Adonis Ajeti (born 1997), Swiss football player
- Adonis Alexander (born 1996), American football player
- Adonis Arms (born 1998), American basketball player
- Adonis Bosso (born 1990), Ivorian-Canadian model
- Adonis Carrasco (born 1993), Dominican football referee
- Adonis Diaz (born 1996), American judoka
- Adonis Durado (born 1975), Filipino poet
- Adonis Filer (born 1993), Rwandan-American basketball player
- Adonis Fotsis (born 1981), Greek basketball player
- Adonis Frías (born 1988), Argentinian football player
- Adonis García (born 1985), Cuban baseball player
- Adonis Georgiadis (born 1972), Greek politician
- Adonis Hilario (born 1965 or 1966), Brazilian football player
- Adonis Jordan (born 1970), American basketball player
- Adonis Kapsalis (born 1980), Greek-American actor
- Adonis Kemp (born 1967), Dutch baseball player
- Adonis A. Kyrou (1923–1985), Greek filmmaker and writer
- Adonis Medina (born 1996), Dominican baseball player
- Adonis Preciado (born 1990), Ecuadorian football player
- Adonis Puentes (born 1974), Cuban-Canadian singer-songwriter
- Adonis Ray (born 1944), Ghanaian boxer
- Adonis Rivas (born 1972), Nicaraguan boxer
- Adonis Rosa (born 1994), Dominican baseball player
- Adonis Rose (born 1975), American drummer
- Adonis Santa Maria (born 1979), Filipino basketball player
- Adonis Sepúlveda (1919–2005), Chilean politician
- Adonis Shropshire, American songwriter
- Adonis Stevenson (born 1977), Haitian-Canadian professional boxer
- Adonis Terry (1864–1915), American baseball player
- Adonis Thomas (born 1993), American basketball player

=== Fictional characters ===
- Adonis Creed, protagonist of the film Creed and its sequel
- Adonis Otogari, singer from Ensemble Stars!
- Adonis, a character from Dyosa
- Adonis, a character in the Teen Titans animated series

== Transportation ==
- USS Adonis, a US Navy ship name
  - USS Adonis (ARL-4), a United States Navy landing craft repair ship
- HMS Adonis, a British Royal Navy ship name
  - HMS Adonis (1806), a British Royal Navy schooner
- Adonis-class schooners, a class of Royal Navy vessels
- Adonis (1874), a wooden brigantine built at Jervis Bay, New South Wales

== Technology ==
- ADONIS (software), a business process analysis tool
- KL-7 or ADONIS, a cipher machine
- ADONIS, an adaptive optics system on the ESO 3.6 m Telescope

== Organisms ==
- Adonis (plant), a genus in the plant family Ranunculaceae
- Adonis blue, a butterfly in the family Lycaenidae
- Adonis opal, a butterfly in the family Lycaenidae
- Asaphodes adonis, a butterfly in the family Geometridae
- Macaria adonis, a butterfly in the family Geometridae
- Adonis tetra, a fish in the family Lepidarchidae
- Acanthicus adonis, a fish in the family Loricariidae
- Atheniella adonis, a mushroom in the genus Cyphellaceae
- Micrixalus adonis, a frog in the family Micrixalidae
- Brettus adonis, a spider in the family Salticidae
- Phidippus adonis, a spider in the family Salticidae
- Psaltoda adonis, a cicada in the family Cicadidae
- Carinodrillia adonis, a sea snail in the family Pseudomelatomidae
- Ancistrobasis adonis, a sea snail in the family Seguinziidae
- Kanamarua adonis, a sea snail in the family Colubrariidae
- Macrocneme adonis, a moth in the family Arciinae
- Fissicrambus adonis a moth in the family Crambidae
- Astrophanes adonis, a bee fly in the family Bombyliidae
- Phanaeus adonis, a dung beetle in the family Scarabaeidae
- Lampropholis adonis, a skink in the family Scincidae
- Suillellus adonis, a fungus in the family Boletaceae
- Evalljapyx adonis, a forcepstail in the family Japygidae

== Other uses ==
- Adonis (musical), an 1884 burlesque musical
- Adonis (cocktail), a cocktail named after the musical
- Marché Adonis, a Canadian grocery store chain
- Adonis (band), a Lebanese indie band
- Adonis Geroskipou, a former Cypriot association football club
- Adonis Idaliou, a former Cypriot association football club
- Adonis Mashhad F.C., a former Iranian association football club
- Adonis (Duquesnoy), 17th-century Flemish statue

== See also ==
- Adonais, an 1821 elegy written by Percy Shelley
- Adonis complex, a muscle dysmorphia
- Adoni (disambiguation), for the singular of Adonis
- Andonis
- Venus and Adonis
- The Birth of Adonis, a painting attributed to Titian
- The Death of Adonis
