= The Death of Adonis =

The Death of Adonis may refer to:

- The Death of Adonis (Mazzuoli), a 1700-1710 marble sculpture by Giuseppe Mazzuoli, in the Hermitage Museum
- The Death of Adonis (Rodin), an 1888 white marble sculpture by Auguste Rodin, in the Musée Rodin
- The Death of Adonis (Rubens), a c. 1614 painting by Peter Paul Rubens, in the Israel Museum
- The Death of Adonis (Sebastiano del Piombo), a 1512 oil on canvas painting, in the Uffizi
