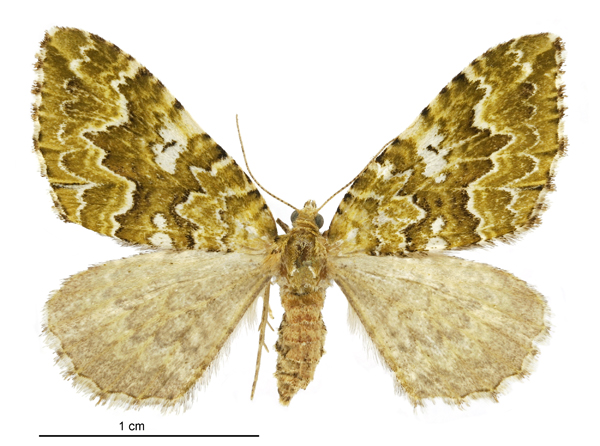
- Female
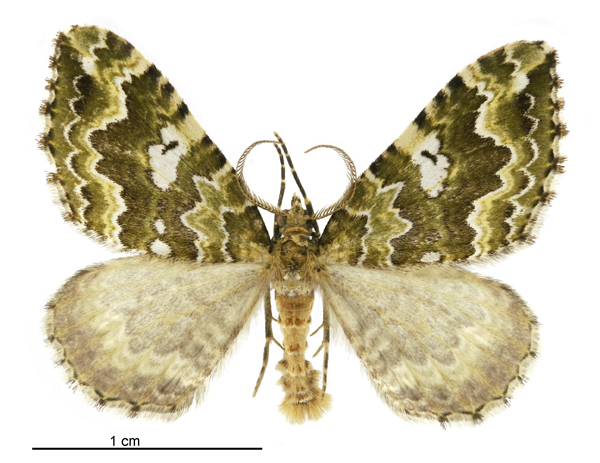
- Male

Scientific classification
- Kingdom: Animalia
- Phylum: Arthropoda
- Clade: Pancrustacea
- Class: Insecta
- Order: Lepidoptera
- Family: Geometridae
- Genus: Asaphodes
- Species: A. beata

Binomial name
- Asaphodes beata (Butler, 1877)

Synonyms
- Cidaria beata Butler, 1877; Xanthorhoe beata (Butler, 1877); Xanthorhoe benedicta Meyrick, 1914; Larentia beata (Butler, 1877)

= Asaphodes beata =

Species of moth endemic to New Zealand

Asaphodes beata (also known as the dotted green carpet moth) is a species of moth in the family Geometridae. It is endemic to New Zealand and is a relatively common species that can be found throughout the country in native forest or scrub habitat, mainly observed in clearings. It can be distinguished from its close relative Asaphodes adonis by the colour of its hindwings. The larvae of this species feeds on watercress but tends to be inactive during the day. If threatened it will mimic a twig dropping to the ground. The adult moths are on the wing commonly from October to March but have been observed in all months of the year. Adults are said to be attracted to white rātā. The white markings on the forewing of the adults are variable in appearance.

== Taxonomy ==
This species was first described by Arthur Gardiner Butler in 1877 as Cidaria beata using a specimen from the collection of J. D. Enys. In 1884 Edward Meyrick placed this species in the genus Larentia. George Hudson discussed and illustrated this species both in his 1898 book under the name Xanthorhoe beata and again in his 1928 publication under the name Xanthorhoe benedicata. In 1927 Louis Beethoven Prout synonymised Xanthorhoe benedicta with Xanthorhoe beata. In 1939 Prout placed this species back in the genus Larentia. However this placement was not accepted by New Zealand taxonomists. In 1971 John S. Dugdale placed this species in the genus Asaphodes. This placement was affirmed by Dugdale in 1988. The male holotype specimen, likely collected at Castle Hill in mid Canterbury, is held at the Natural History Museum, London.

== Description ==
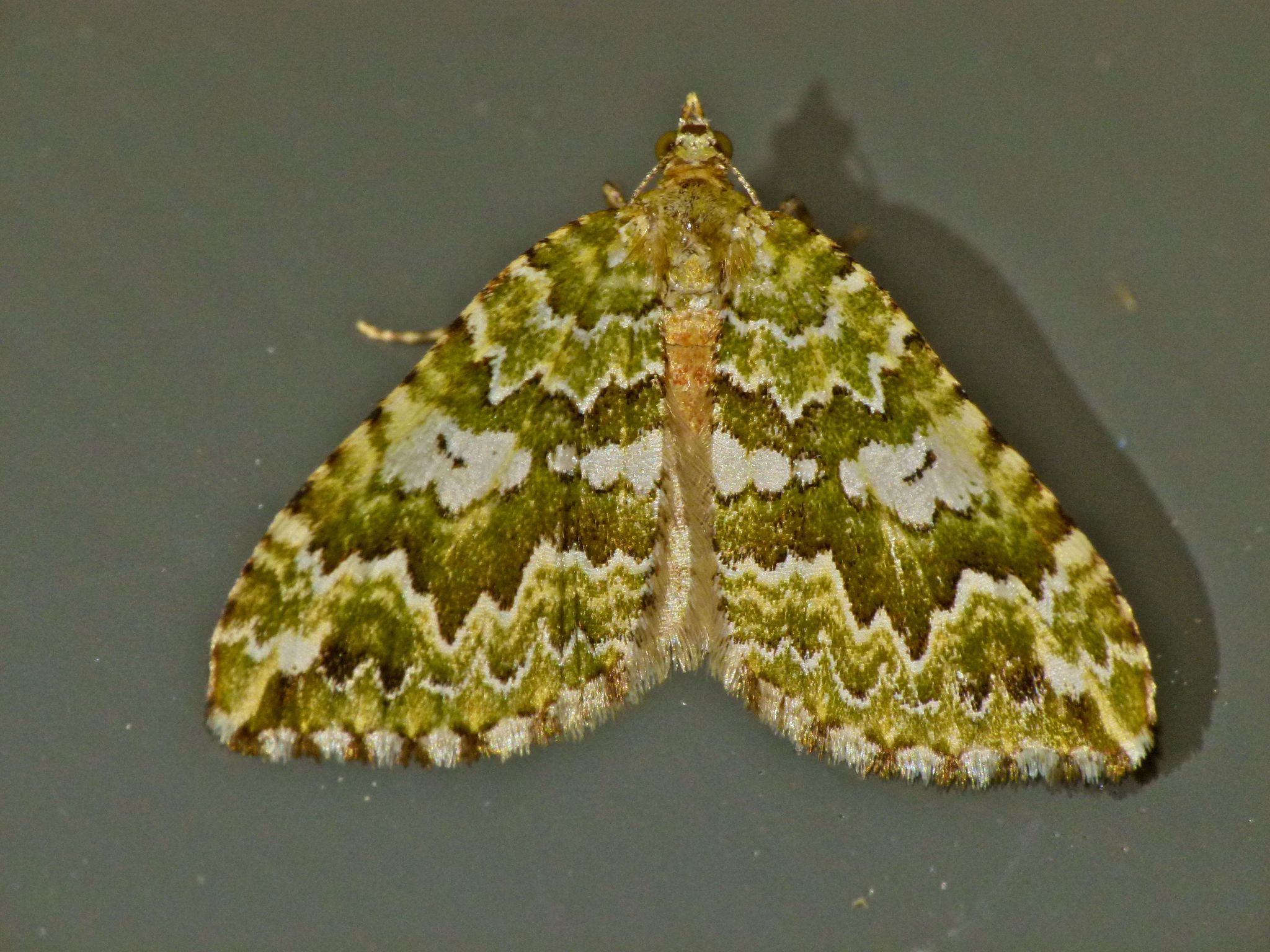
Observation of A. beata.

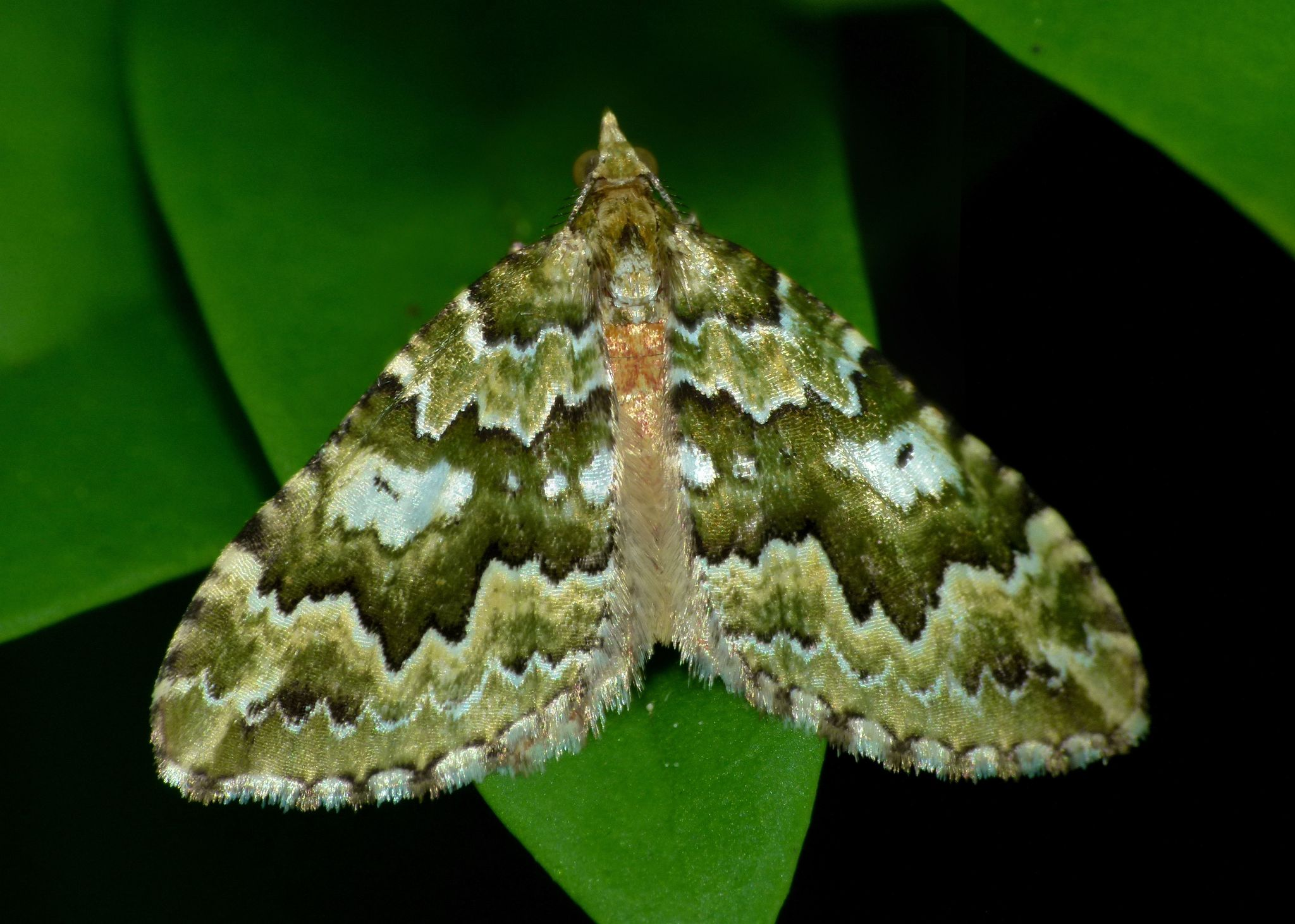
Observation of A. beata.

Hudson described the egg of this moth as being:

about one fiftieth of an inch in length, oval, considerably flattened, with a distinct concavity on each side. It is green, highly polished, with numerous very shallow hexagonal depressions. Its colour changes to greyish-green about two days prior to hatching.

He described the larvae as:

orange-brown, becoming greenish-brown soon after emergence. The full-grown larva is dark brown above and pale brown beneath, the two colours being sharply separated on the sides by a broken white line. A series of V-shaped markings is situated on the back, each mark enclosing a paler area. Several fine black wavy lines traverse the darker portions of the larva, and a dark mark, edged with black beneath, is situated on each segment just above the ventral surface.

The larva forms a frail cocoon on the ground in which it pupates.

Butler originally described the adults of this species as follows:

Above very similar in pattern to the preceding species, but much smaller, and the primaries with all the markings olive-green instead of bronzy brown; the secondaries white instead of yellow, with a pale pinky brown outer border; thorax olive-green; abdomen testaceous : primaries below with the basal area, to the extremity of the dentated central band of the upper surface, madder-brown; costa testaceous, tinted with olivaceous, and crossed by ferruginous bars; disk whitey-brown; apex and outer border shining testaceous, almost golden; a submarginal series of white dots; fringe silvery white, black-spotted; secondaries pale testaceous, increasing in intensity to the outer border, which is golden, crossed by parallel crenate olivaceous lines, three of which form a central band, relieved externally by white lunules; disk crossed by paler olivaceous lines, followed by a submarginal series of white lunules; body below testaceous. Expanse of wings 1 inch.

This species can be distinguished from its close relative A. adonis by the colour of its hindwings. Hudson states that the white markings on the forewings of this moth are variable. It is also very similar in appearance to A. philpotti, to the point where A. philpotti was previously encapsulated within the concept of this species. However A. beata has black marks inside the white discal spots on the forewings which A. philpotti lacks. A. philpotti also distributed in more southerly locations.

== Distribution ==
This species is endemic to New Zealand. This relatively common species can be found in native forest throughout the country. It frequents forest clearings. It can also be found in coastal habitat.

== Behaviour ==
The larvae of this species are inactive during the day and when threatened mimics a twig dropping to the ground. Adult moths are most commonly on the wing from October until March but have been observed in all months of the year. Adults are attracted to light.

== Habitat and hosts ==
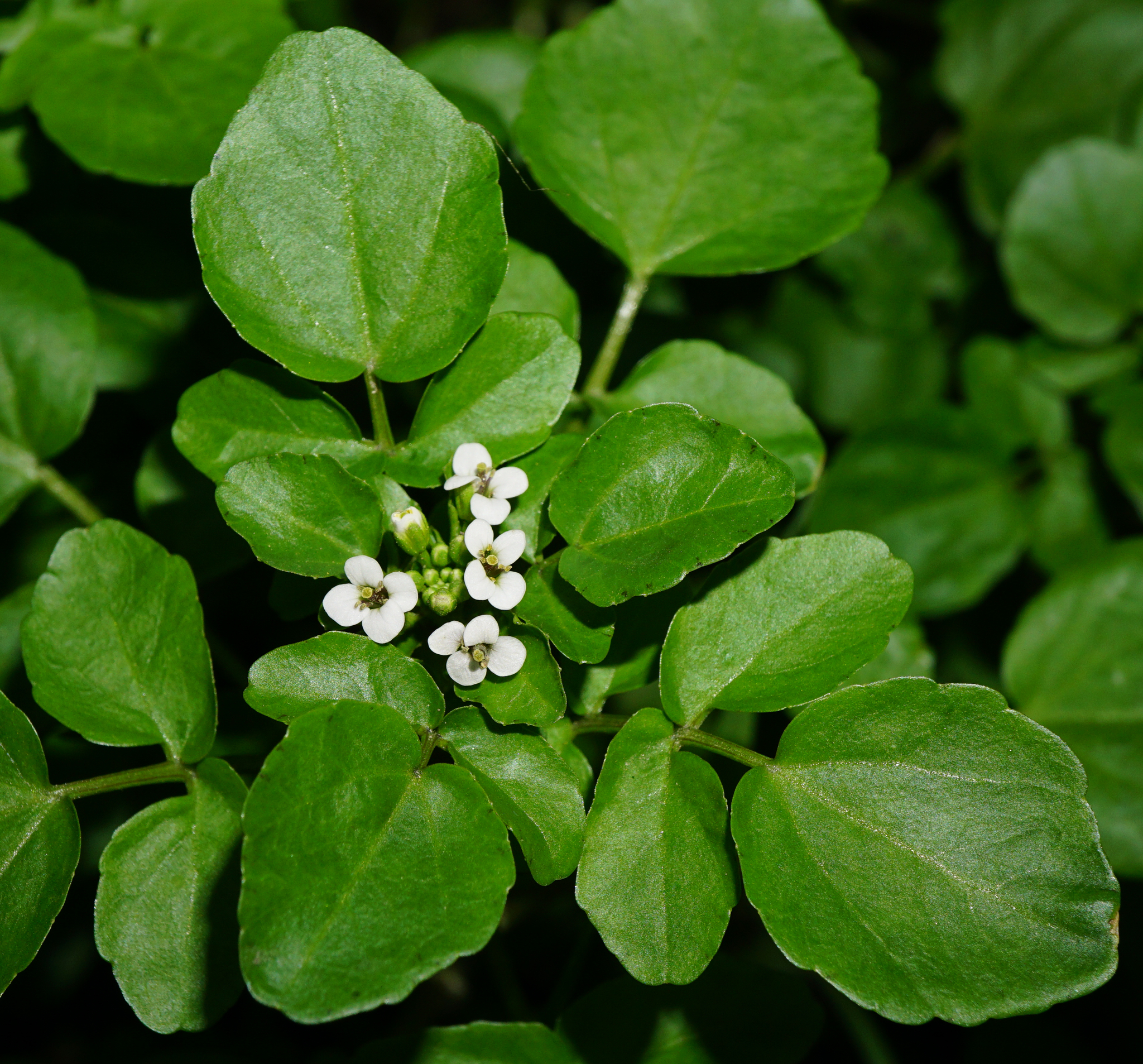
Nasturtium officinale, introduced host species

This species inhabits native forest and scrub. Hudson stated that the larvae of this species feed on watercress. Larvae have also been found feeding on plants on the forest floor including on native herb plants in the genera Epilobium, Cardamine, and Stellaria. Adults are said to be attracted to the flowers of the white rātā.
