= Adony (disambiguation) =

Adony may refer to:

- Adony (also Duna·adony, Duna-Adony), a town in Fejér County, Hungary
- Éradony, a town in Bihor County, now Romania
- Nyíradony, a city in Hajdú-Bihar County, Hungary

== See also ==
- Adoni (disambiguation)
- Adonis (disambiguation)
- Adonai
