= Andonis =

- Andonis George Manganaris-Decavalles, known as Andonis Manganaris-Decavalles (1920 – 2008), whose pen name is Andonis Decavalles), Greek-American poet and professor
- Andonis Michaelides (1958 – 2011), known as Mick Karn, English-Cypriot musician and songwriter

== See also ==
- Adonis (disambiguation)
- Andoni (name)
- Antonis
