= Adoni (disambiguation) =

Adoni is a city in Andhra Pradesh, India.

Adoni may also refer to:

== Religion ==
- Adon from Hebrew Adoni can be translated as "my lord"
- Names of God in Judaism § Adonai for Adonai, the name of God
- Adonis, a central figure in various mystery religions

== Places ==
- Adoni (Bihor), village in Tarcea Commune, Bihor County, Romania
- Adoni (Assembly constituency)
- Adoni Municipality
- Adoni Urban mandal
- Adoni Rural mandal
- Adoni revenue division
- Nuraghe Adoni

== Given names ==
- Adoni Maropis (born 1963), American actor

== Surnames ==
- Zacharias Adoni (born 1999), Cypriot footballer

== See also ==
- Adonis (disambiguation)
- Adony (disambiguation)
