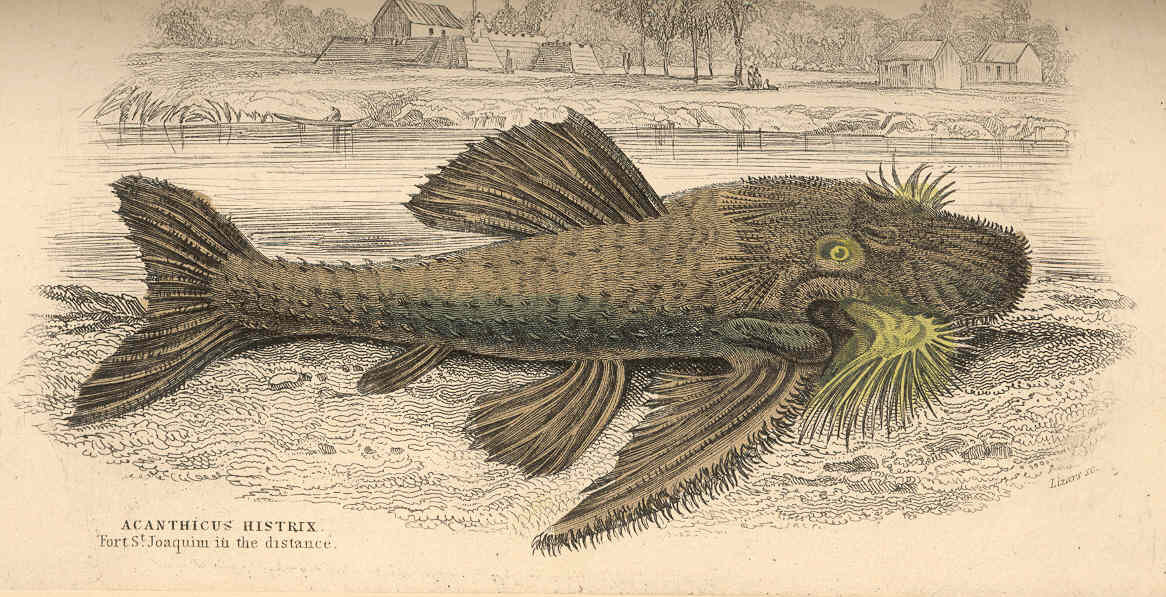
- Acanthicus hystrix

Scientific classification
- Kingdom: Animalia
- Phylum: Chordata
- Class: Actinopterygii
- Order: Siluriformes
- Family: Loricariidae
- Tribe: Ancistrini
- Genus: Acanthicus; Agassiz in Spix & Agassiz, 1829

Type species
- Acanthicus hystrix Agassiz in Spix & Agassiz, 1829

= Acanthicus =

Acanthicus Temporal range: Late Miocene–Present

Genus of fishes

Acanthicus is a genus of large, South American suckermouth armored catfishes native to the Amazon and Orinoco basins, and possibly in Guyana. The name Acanthicus is derived from the Greek, akanthikos meaning thorny, spiny. Fish of this genus are known as lyre-tail plecos. These species are found in large rivers, primarily in areas with a rocky bottom and a moderate or strong current.

== Species ==
There are currently 2 recognized species in this genus:

- Acanthicus adonis Isbrücker & Nijssen, 1988 (adonis pleco, polka dot lyre-tail pleco)
- Acanthicus hystrix Agassiz in Spix & Agassiz, 1829 (lyre-tail pleco)

A. hystrix is also known as L155 by the L-number system. Possibly undescribed species in the genus are L193 (Orinoco basin) and L407 (Branco basin), but these may be variants of A. hystrix.

== Description ==
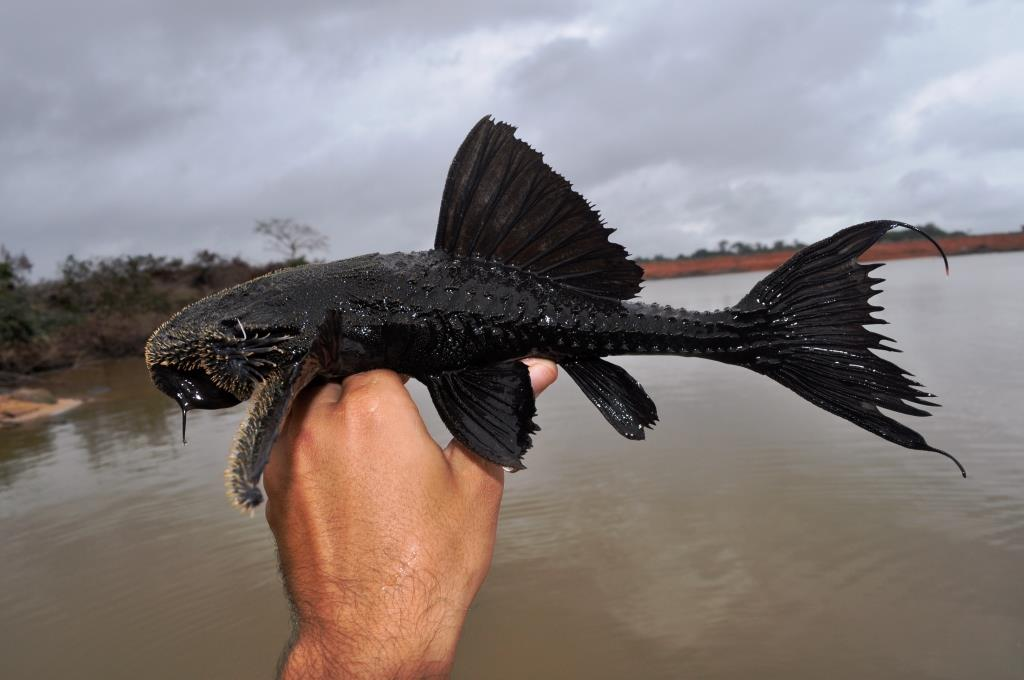
Acanthicus hystrix always lacks white spots

Even in this relatively dark photo, the fine white spots in this medium-sized Acanthicus adonis can be seen (spots far more conspicuous in juveniles)

Acanthicus are among the largest species in the family Loricariidae. The largest officially measured A. adonis is 30.5 cm (12.0 in) in standard length (SL), and the largest officially measured A. hystrix is 62.8 cm (24.7 in) SL, but both appear to reach about 100 cm (39 in) SL.

These fish are relatively slender, spiny Loricariids that lack an adipose fin. The caudal fin possesses long filamentous lobes on the upper and lower margins and is forked. The pectoral fin spines are extremely long. The entire dorsal surface of the head is covered in stout, sharp odontodes. The odontodes form a sharp keel on the lateral plates and, in juveniles, there are few to no odontodes on the plates above and below the keel rows. The cheek odontodes are fairly thin, but numerous. Males may have more and longer cheek odontodes and greatly elongated odontodes on the pectoral fin spine.

The colour of these fish is black, dark gray or medium to dark brown. Unlike A. hystrix, juvenile A. adonis shows white spots; these are reduced with age and large adults may lack them.

== In the aquarium ==
Both A. adonis and A. hystrix are sometimes kept in aquariums, and especially the densely white-spotted juveniles of the former species are regularly seen in the trade. They are opportunistic, omnivorous feeders that require well-oxygenated water. Their massive adult size and territorially aggressive behavior means that a very large tank is required. The territorial behavior is mostly aimed at other suckermouth armored catfishes and during disputes Acanthicus have even been known to kill Pterygoplichthys gibbiceps (itself typically considered a robust species). They have been bred in captivity.
