= Suillellus atlanticus =

Scientific classification
- Kingdom: Fungi
- Division: Basidiomycota
- Class: Agaricomycetes
- Order: Boletales
- Family: Boletaceae
- Genus: Suillellus
- Species: S. atlanticus

Binomial name
- Suillellus atlanticus (Pöder & H.Ladurner) Vizzini, Simonini & Gelardi (2014)

Synonyms
- Boletus atlanticus Blanco-Dios & G.Marques (2013)

Species of bolete fungus

Suillellus atlanticus is a species of bolete fungus in the family Boletaceae. It is only found in coastal sand dunes in Galicia, northwestern Spain, where it fruits under rockrose (Cistus salviifolius) and maritime pine (Pinus pinaster).

== Taxonomy ==
The species was formally described as Boletus atlanticus by Jaime Blanco-Dios and Guilhermina Miguel da Silva Marques in 2012. The epithet atlanticus alludes to its Atlantic-coast habitat. The holotype (LOU-Fungi 19418) was collected on 29 October 2005 in tertiary dunes near Penisqueira Beach (A Coruña, Spain). Subsequent molecular studies have placed this taxon in the genus Suillellus, giving it its current name.

== Description ==
Fruit bodies (basidiocarps) have a cap (pileus) 65–155 mm broad, initially hemispheric before becoming broadly convex. The surface is smooth and slightly viscid when wet, with central tones ranging from pink to orange that fade to light brown, grading into shades of yellow and cream toward an undulate(wavy) margin. On bruising, the cap flesh rapidly turns deep blue or greenish before darkening to a black-blue hue. The pore surface consists of tubes 8–15 mm long, adnate to the stem, yellow at first and slowly blueing when handled. Pores are small (0.4–0.7 mm wide), oval or triangular, ageing from pale orange to rust and staining greenish grey on contact. The stipe measures 60–130 mm × 15–55 mm, is bright yellow except for a reddish-purple basal third, and bears an irregular orange reticulum except in the upper 1–2 cm where the network is finer and yellow. The yellow flesh (context) bruises blue or greyish blue, except near the base where garnet to purple tones dominate. The odour is mild to garlicky and the taste is unremarkable; edibility remains unknown. Microscopically, spores are ellipsoid to fusoid, 10.5–15.5 × 4.5–7.3 μm (mean 12.7 × 6 μm), four-spored basidia measure 20.5–35 × 5.5–14.5 μm, and the cap cuticle (pileipellis) is a trichoderm of interwoven, septate hyphae.

== Habitat and distribution ==
At the time of its original publication, Suillellus atlanticus was known only from its type locality on coastal sand dunes in Galicia, Spain, where it grows in mycorrhizal association with rockrose (Cistus salviifolius) and maritime pine (Pinus pinaster). Fruiting occurs in autumn, chiefly between October and November.
