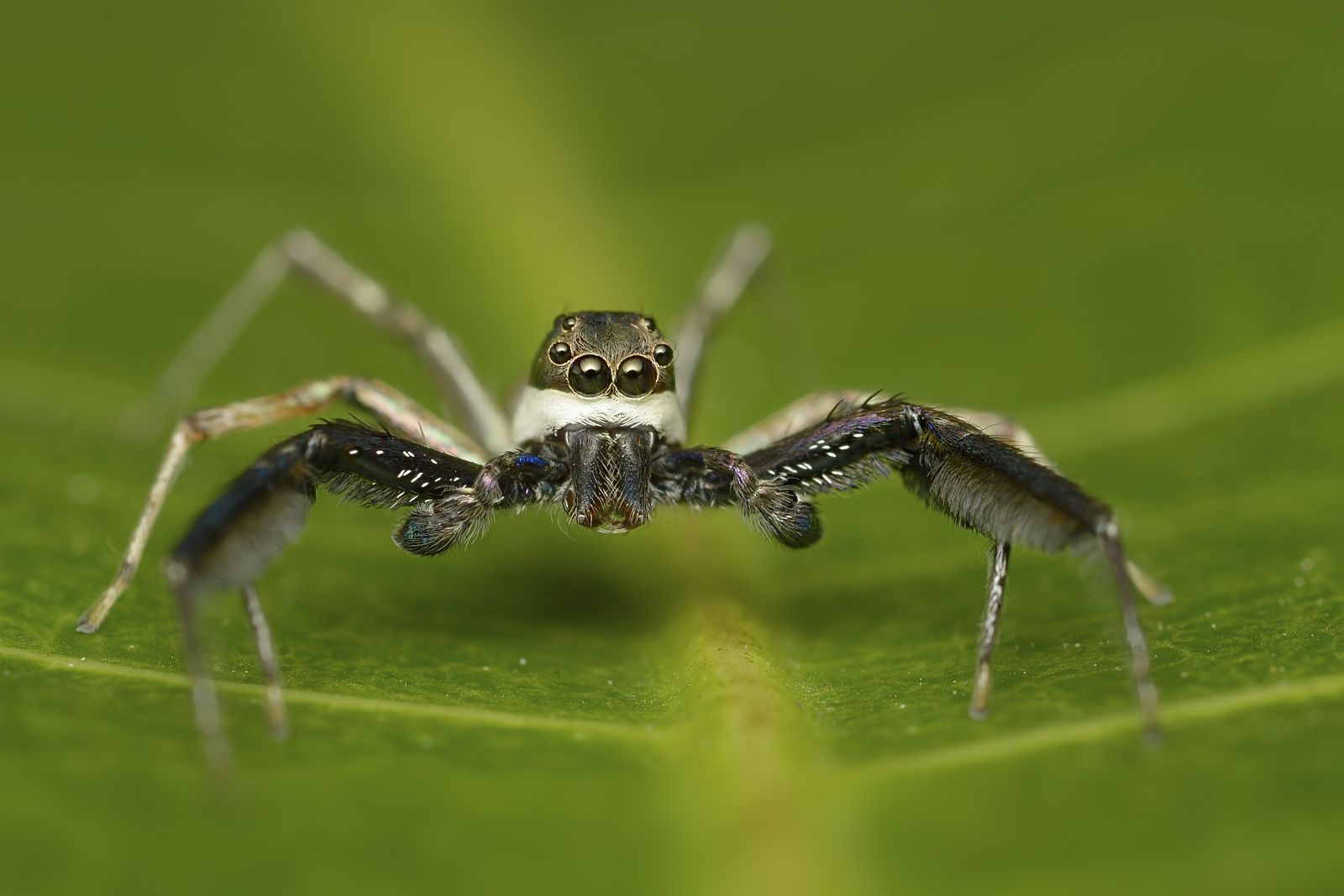
- Male from Kerala, India.

Scientific classification
- Kingdom: Animalia
- Phylum: Arthropoda
- Subphylum: Chelicerata
- Class: Arachnida
- Order: Araneae
- Infraorder: Araneomorphae
- Family: Salticidae
- Genus: Brettus
- Species: B. cingulatus

Binomial name
- Brettus cingulatus Thorell, 1895

= Brettus cingulatus =

Species of spider

Brettus cingulatus is a species of jumping spider of the genus Brettus. It is found in India, Sri Lanka, China, Vietnam, Myanmar, Thailand, Malaysia and Indonesia.

The species was first described in 1895 from a single specimen. The female was originally misidentified as another species, B. albolimbatus. Males and females look very different due to sexual dimorphism. Only in 2017 was the species rediscovered in Nagaon near Mumbai, India, far away from its original discovery in Myanmar.

The epithet "cingulatus" means "wearing a belt" in Latin, "albolimbatus" refers to white limbs.

== Preying behaviour ==
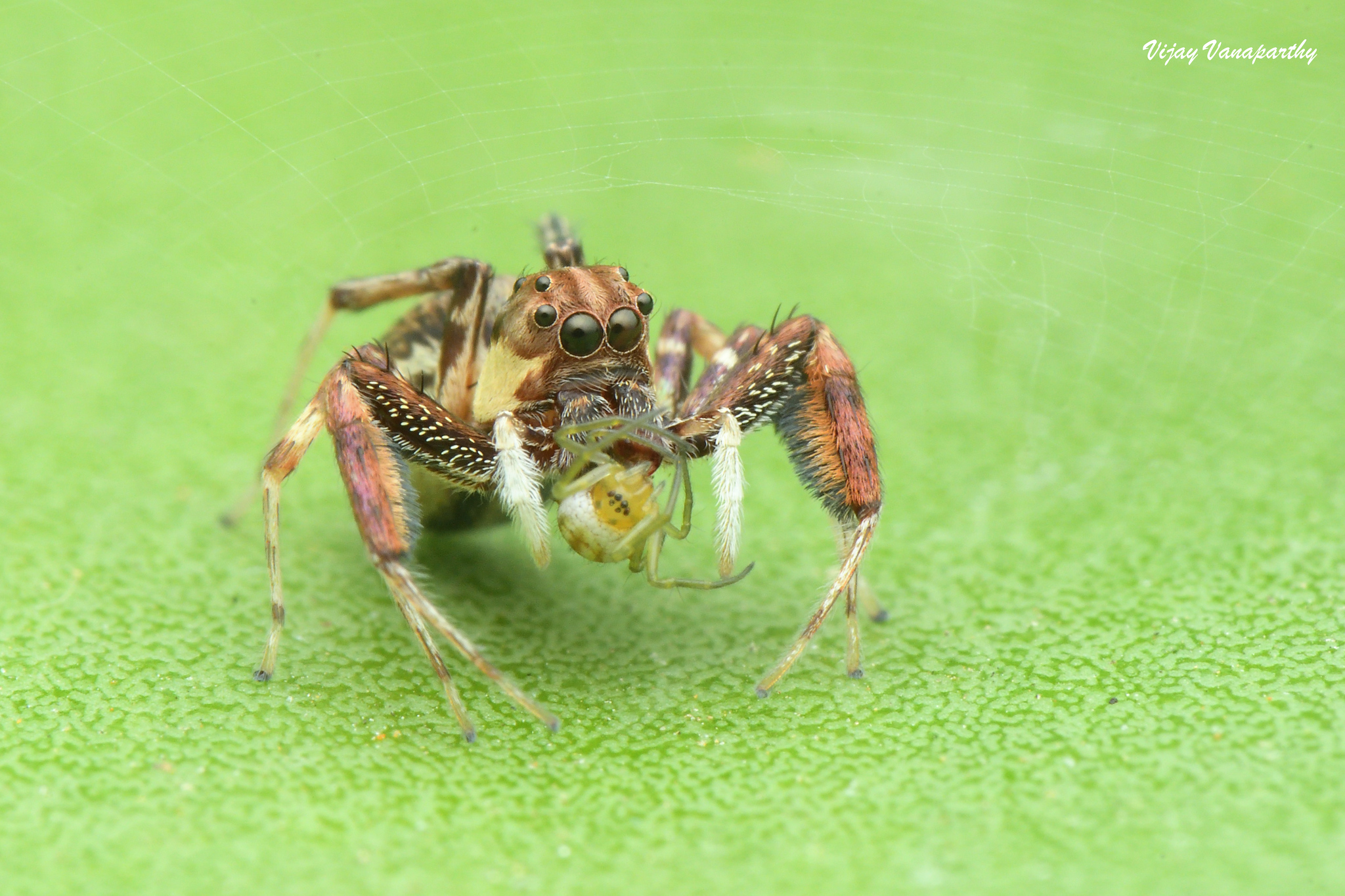
Female feeding on Araneus sp. in Bengaluru, Karnataka, India.

This spider preys upon other spiders. To capture web-building spiders, the typical strategy is to stand at the edge of the web and pluck upon the silken strings with its pedipalps, trying out numerous patterns/rhythms until an effective one is found, then to lunge and capture/stab the spider when it gets lured over(aggressive mimicry). Brettus cingulatus does not adhere to spider silk and can walk on webs with ease, but usually does not go into the webs of other spiders.

In studies, this spider also readily stalked insects, approaching at fast speeds, then slowing down and eventually lunging at the insect to capture it. However, they prefer to eat web-building spiders.

It has also been observed that individuals will also hunt on young individuals of other spiders.

=== Oophagy ===
Oophagy was observed in an individual in Mangalore, India. A female which was missing legs I and II on the left side, was also guarding her egg cluster in her nest. Over the next two days, she remained in place. But after 3 days, around 8:30 AM, a different, intact female had taken over the nest, and the original female was found moving slowly on a lower branch. Later that day, around 3:30 PM, it was observed that the new female had eaten several eggs, with even more eggs consumed by dusk and nearly all eaten by 8:00 PM.

== Maternal care and Mating ==
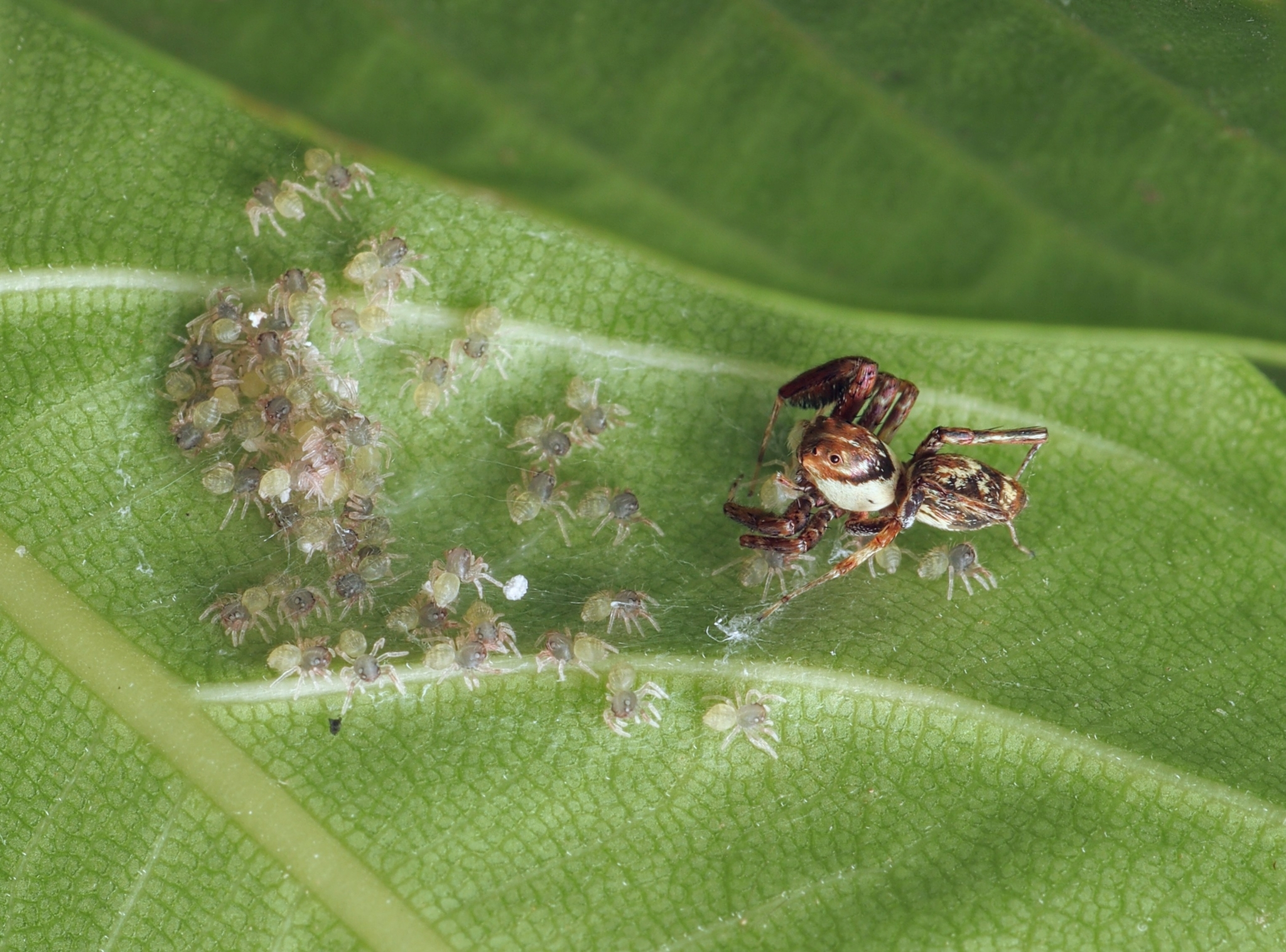
Brooding female.

Brooding by female Brettus cingulatus, including occupation of a single nest site by a series of different females, has been documented.

The quick removal of silk, white flecks, and eggshell fragments after hatching, along with the rapid darkening of the young's body parts, indicates that spiderlings might be eating these materials. While this feeding hasn't been directly observed, it's also possible that the brooding female could be removing or consuming these items.
