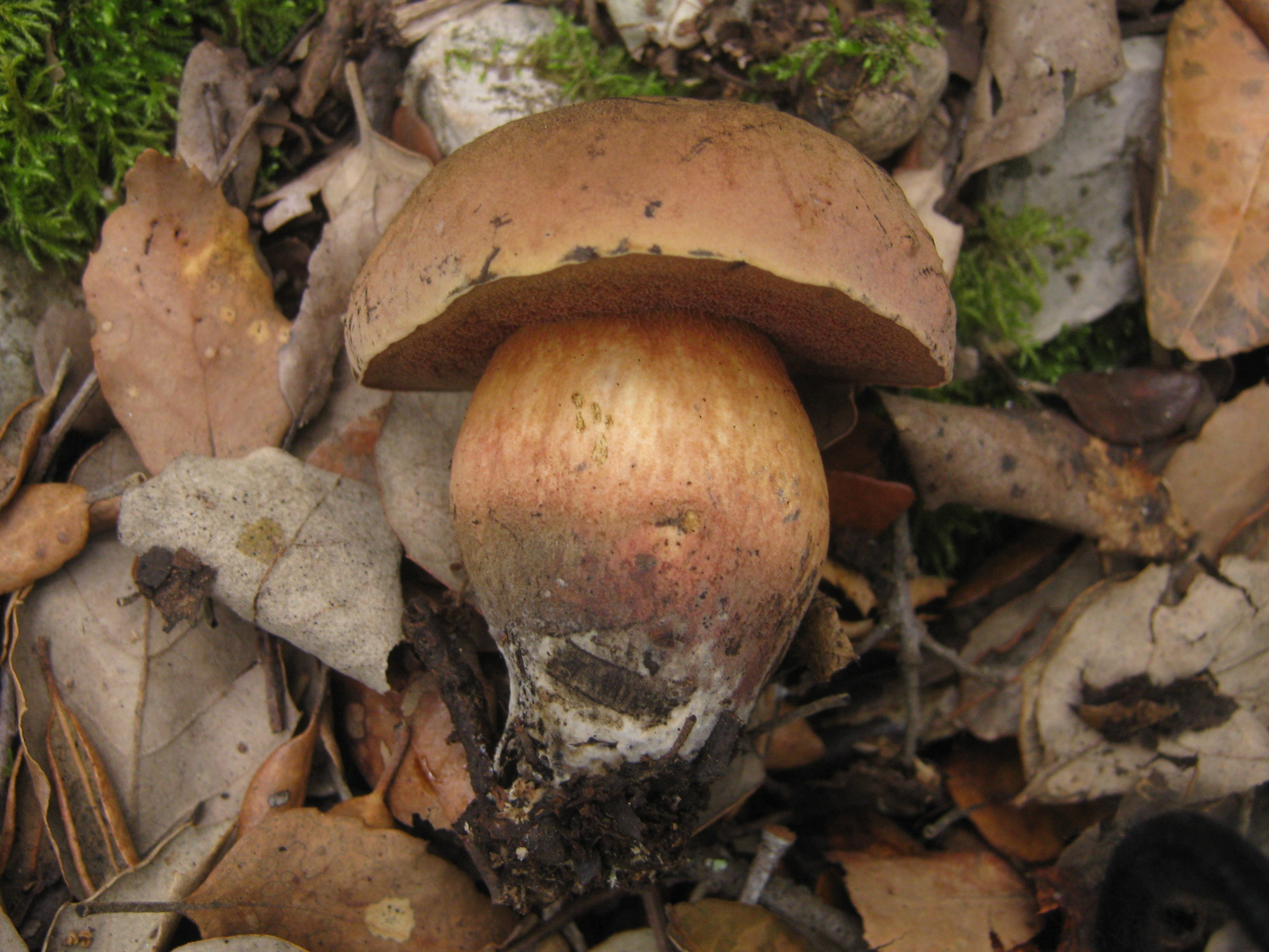

Scientific classification
- Domain: Eukaryota
- Kingdom: Fungi
- Division: Basidiomycota
- Class: Agaricomycetes
- Order: Boletales
- Family: Boletaceae
- Genus: Suillellus
- Species: S. comptus

Binomial name
- Suillellus comptus (Simonini) Vizzini, Simonini & Gelardi (2014)

Synonyms
- Boletus comptus Simonini (1993)

= Suillellus comptus =

Species of fungus

Suillellus comptus is a species of bolete fungus found in Europe. Originally described as a species of Boletus in 1993, it was transferred to Suillellus in 2014.
