= Suillellus hypocarycinus =

Scientific classification
- Domain: Eukaryota
- Kingdom: Fungi
- Division: Basidiomycota
- Class: Agaricomycetes
- Order: Boletales
- Family: Boletaceae
- Genus: Suillellus
- Species: S. hypocarycinus

Binomial name
- Suillellus hypocarycinus (Singer) Murrill (1948)

Synonyms
- Boletus hypocarycinus Singer (1945)

Species of fungus

Suillellus hypocarycinus is a species of bolete fungus found in North America. Originally described as a species of Boletus by Rolf Singer in 1945, it was transferred to Suillellus by William Alphonso Murrill in 1948.
