= Suillellus pictiformis =

Scientific classification
- Domain: Eukaryota
- Kingdom: Fungi
- Division: Basidiomycota
- Class: Agaricomycetes
- Order: Boletales
- Family: Boletaceae
- Genus: Suillellus
- Species: S. pictiformis

Binomial name
- Suillellus pictiformis Murrill (1943)

Synonyms
- Boletus pictiformis (Murrill) Murrill (1943); Boletellus pictiformis (Murrill) Singer (1945)

Species of fungus

Suillellus pictiformis is a species of bolete fungus found in North America. It was originally described by American mycologist William Alphonso Murrill in 1943.
