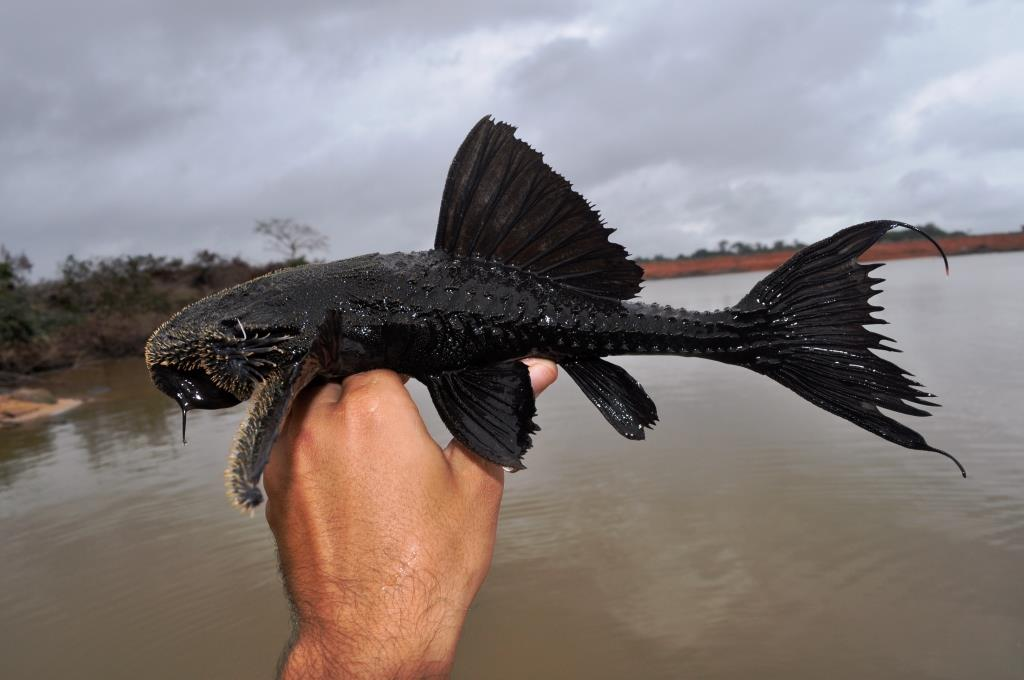
- From the Xingu River (Altamira, Pará, Brazil)

Conservation status
- Least Concern (IUCN 3.1)

Scientific classification
- Kingdom: Animalia
- Phylum: Chordata
- Class: Actinopterygii
- Order: Siluriformes
- Family: Loricariidae
- Genus: Acanthicus
- Species: A. hystrix

Binomial name
- Acanthicus hystrix Spix & Agassiz, 1829

Synonyms
- Rinelepis acanthicus Valenciennes, 1840

= Acanthicus hystrix =

Species of fish

Acanthicus hystrix, the lyre-tail pleco, is a species of freshwater ray-finned fish belonging to the family Loricariidae, the suckermouth armoured catfishes, and the subfamily Hypostominae, the suckermouth catfishes. This species is found in South America.

== Taxonomy ==
Acanthicus hystrix was first formally described in 1829 by the naturalists Johann Baptist von Spix and Louis Agassiz with its type locality given as the Amazon River. When the species was described Agassiz proposed the new monospecific genus Acanthicus, so this species is the type species of that genus by monotypy. A second species, A. adonis was added in 1988 by Isbrücker and Han Nijssen. There arepossibly another two undescribed species in the genus, although these may just be variants of A. hystrix. Eschmeyer's Catalog of Fishes classified the genus Acanthicus in the subfamily Hypostominae, the suckermouth catfishes, within the suckermouth armored catfish family Loricariidae.

== Etymology ==
Acanthicus hystrix is the type species of the genus Acanthicus, which is derived from the Greek akánthinos, meaning "thorny", alluding to entire upper surface of the head of this species, being armed with long erectile odontodes. The specific name, hystrix, means "porcupine", another references to the erectile, long spine-like odontodes on the upper head of this species.

== Appearance ==
Acanthicus hystrix grows to 62.8 cm (2.06 ft) in standard length, but may possibly reach 100 cm (3.3 ft). Its color ranges from medium-brown to near-black (especially those from the Madeira, Branco and Xingu rivers are dark), and the underparts often have a vermiculated pattern. Some of the variants are commonly considered as separate, undescribed species in the aquarium trade (e.g., L193 from the Orinoco basin and L407 from the Branco basin; in the L-number system), but there is extensive overlap in the morphometrics of the different populations. Unlike the polka dot lyre-tail pleco (A. adonis), A. hystrix never has white spots. Adult males are especially spiny with extensive odontodes on the cheeks and opercle.

== Distribution and habitat ==
Acanthicus hystrix is found in South America where it is found in the Amazon basin of Brazil, the Orinoco system in Colombia and Venezuela and the Ucayali River in Peru, it may also occur in Guyana and Suriname. This species is found along shorelines with fallen wood where it feeds on the periphyton growing on submerged wood.

== Utilisation ==
Acanthicus hystrix is occasionally seen in the aquarium trade, but its adult size and territorially aggressive behavior means that a very large tank is required.
