= The Legend of Polydoros =

Painting by Titian

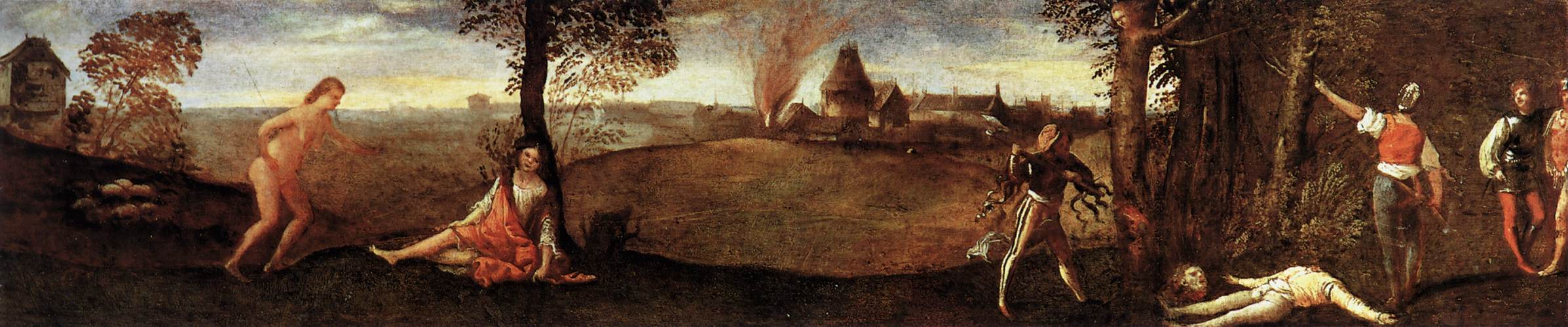
The Legend of Polydoros (c. 1506-1508) by Titian

The Legend of Polydoros or The Forest of Polydorus is an oil on panel painting, attributed to Titian, from c. 1506-1508. It is held in the Musei civici, in Padua. It forms a pair with The Birth of Adonis - they both formed part of a cassone and were left to their present home by Emo Capodilista in 1864. Then attributed to Giorgione, they are now generally attributed to Titian, though a few art historians attribute them instead to Romanino.

The subject is from Ovid's Metamorphoses. Priam ordered his son Polydorus to carry Troy's gold to his step-brother to keep it from the Greeks. At the right of the painting Polydorus is killed en route for the gold, whilst to the left are two women, perhaps Hecuba and a servant. Troy burns in the centre background.
