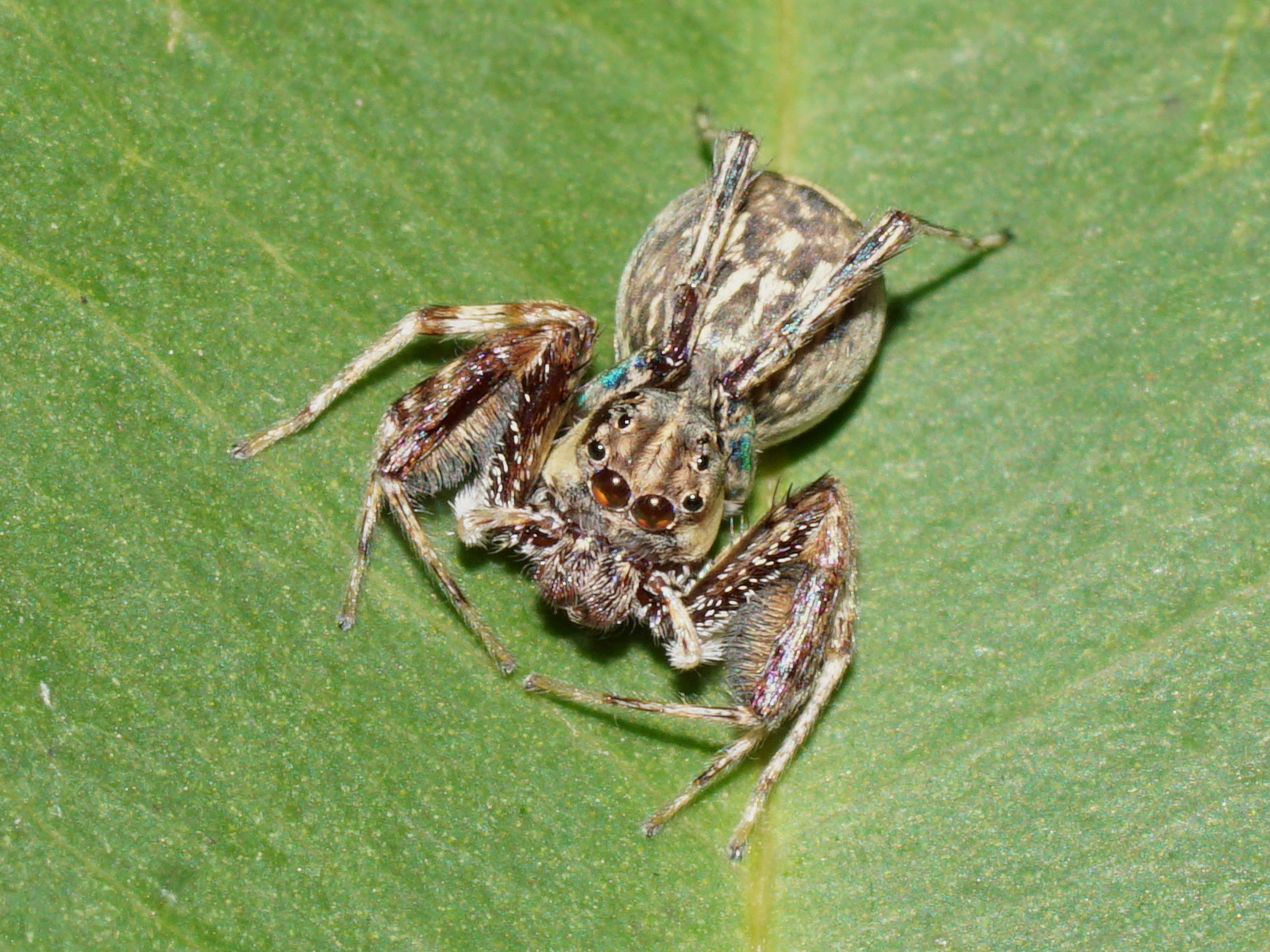
- Brettus sp. in Kerala, India

Scientific classification
- Kingdom: Animalia
- Phylum: Arthropoda
- Subphylum: Chelicerata
- Class: Arachnida
- Order: Araneae
- Infraorder: Araneomorphae
- Family: Salticidae
- Subfamily: Spartaeinae
- Genus: Brettus; Thorell, 1895

Type species
- Brettus cingulatus Thorell, 1895

Species
- See text

Diversity
- 6 species

= Brettus =

Genus of spiders

Brettus is a genus of jumping spiders. Its six described species are found in southern Asia from India to China and Sulawesi, with a single species endemic to Madagascar.

Two species in this genus, B. celebensis and B. madagascarensis, were originally described as members of the genus Macopaeus.

According to Thorell, the genus name is taken from Greek mythology. Brettos (Βρεττος) was a son of Heracles (appears at Stephanus of Byzantium).

== Diet and behaviour ==
At least 2 species, Brettus cingulatus and Brettus adonis, feed on other spiders. Taking advantage of their ability to not adhere to any kind of spider silk, they practise aggressive mimicry and pluck upon the webs of web-building spiders to lure them over to the Brettus at the edge of the web, where they capture/stab their victim. These two spider species also prefer web-building spiders to insects as prey. They are in these regards similar to the other Spartaeinae jumping spiders of genera Portia, Cyrba and Gelotia.

== Species ==
- Brettus adonis Simon, 1900 — Sri Lanka
- Brettus anchorum Wanless, 1979 — India, Nepal
- Brettus celebensis (Merian, 1911) — Sulawesi
- Brettus cingulatus Thorell, 1895 — India, Myanmar
- Brettus madagascarensis (Peckham & Peckham, 1903) — Madagascar
- Brettus storki Logunov & Azarkina, 2008 — Borneo
