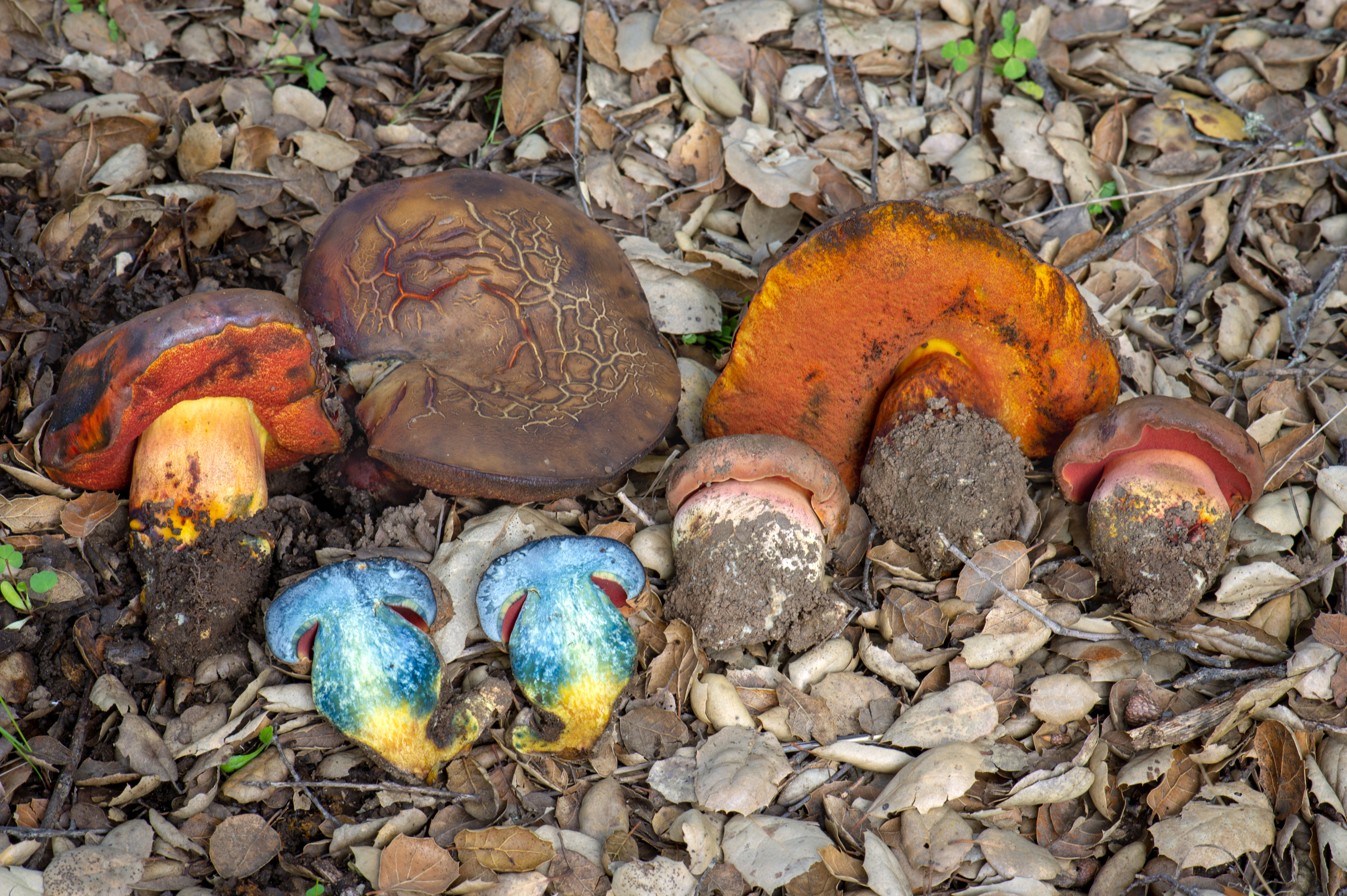
- Suillellus amygdalinus

Scientific classification
- Kingdom: Fungi
- Division: Basidiomycota
- Class: Agaricomycetes
- Order: Boletales
- Family: Boletaceae
- Genus: Suillellus; Murrill (1909)

Type species
- Suillellus luridus (Schaeff.) Murrill (1909)

Species
- S. adonis S. amygdalinus S. atlanticus S. comptus S. hypocarycinus S. luridiceps S. luridus S. mendax S. pictiformis S. queletii

= Suillellus =

Genus of fungi

Suillellus is a genus of bolete fungi in the family Boletaceae. It was originally described by William Alphonso Murrill in 1909 with Suillellus luridus (originally described as a species of Boletus) as the type species. The genus was later merged with Boletus, but was eventually resurrected in 2014, after molecular phylogenetics research demonstrated that Suillellus species comprised a different lineage than Boletus.

== Species ==
Image	Scientific name	Taxon author	Year	Distribution
	Suillellus adalgisae	(Marsico & Musumeci) N. Schwab	2019 (2011)	Italy.
	Suillellus adonis	(Pöder & H. Ladurner) Vizzini, Simonini & Gelardi	2014 (2002)	Cres and Cyprus
	Suillellus amygdalinus	(Thiers) Vizzini, Simonini & Gelardi	2014 (1975)	California and Oregon.
	Suillellus atlanticus	(Blanco-Dios & G. Marques) Vizzini, Simonini & Gelardi	2014 (2013)	Spain (Galicia)
	Suillellus austrinus	(Singer) Murrill	1948 (1945)	
	Suillellus caucasicus	(Singer ex Alessio) Blanco-Dios	2015 (1985/1947)	Europe
	Suillellus comptus	(Simonini) Vizzini, Simonini & Gelardi	2014 (1993)	Europe
	Suillellus gabretae	(Pilát) Blanco-Dios	2015 (1968)	
	Suillellus hypocarycinus	(Singer) Murrill	1948 (1945)	North America
	Suillellus luridiceps	Murrill	1946	
	Suillellus luridus (Netstelige heksenboleet)	(Schaeff.) Murrill	1909 (1774)	Europe
	Suillellus mendax	(Simonini & Vizzini) Vizzini, Simonini & Gelardi	2014 (2013)	Italy, France, and the island of Cyprus.
	Suillellus pictiformis	Murrill	1943	North America.
	Suillellus queletii (Gladstelige heksenboleet)	(Schulzer) Vizzini, Simonini & Gelardi	2014 (1885)	Europe
	Suillellus subamygdalinus	Kuan Zhao & Zhu L. Yang	2016	Pakistan
	Suillellus subvelutipes	(Peck) Murrill	1948 (1889)	
