= Venus and Adonis =

Venus and Adonis may refer to:

== Literary works ==
- "Venus and Adonis", a story from Book X of Ovid's Metamorphoses
- Venus and Adonis (Shakespeare poem)
- Venus and Adonis (Constable poem), a poem by Henry Constable

== Operas ==
- Venus and Adonis (opera), an opera by John Blow
- Vénus et Adonis, an opera by Henry Desmarest
- Venus y Adonis, a pastoral opera by José de Nebra
- Venus und Adonis, an opera by Hans Werner Henze

== Paintings ==
- Venus and Adonis (Titian), of which there are versions from the 1520s onward
- Venus and Adonis (Veronese, Augsburg), 1562
- Venus and Adonis (Veronese, Madrid), 1580
- Venus and Adonis (Poussin), c. 1626
- Venus and Adonis (Rubens, 1614)
- Venus and Adonis (Rubens, 1635)
- Venus and Adonis (Phillips), an 1808 work by Thomas Phillips

== See also ==
- Adonis
- The Death of Adonis (Rubens)
- Venus (mythology)
- Venus, Adonis and Cupid, by Annibale Carracci, c. 1595
