= Adonis Baths =

- Waterfall
- Waterfall in Kili
- Coordinates: 34°52′17″N 32°26′09″E
- Country: Cyprus
- District: Paphos District
- Elevation: 267 m (876 ft)
- Time zone: UTC+2 (EET)
  - Summer (DST): UTC+3 (EEST)

Adonis Baths is a waterfall near Krya Vrysi and Lakkos tou Fragkou. It is located 267 m above sea level. In the north west of Kili village, in the province of Paphos, where Mavrokolympos flows, the waters gather and form a small waterfall. These waters over the centuries eroded the soil and formed a small lake. The recent designation of the site as "Adonis Baths" (distinct from the historically documented "Baths of Aphrodite"), has been introduced by the owner of the surrounding land. This designation does not appear in ancient or medieval sources. The landowner, Charalampos Theodorou, also owns the private company "LOUTRA TOU ADONE LIMITED". While the river itself is considered public land, access to the site is subject to a fee charged by the company.
