= Acanthicus adonis =

Conservation status
- Least Concern (IUCN 3.1)

Scientific classification
- Kingdom: Animalia
- Phylum: Chordata
- Class: Actinopterygii
- Order: Siluriformes
- Family: Loricariidae
- Genus: Acanthicus
- Species: A. adonis

Binomial name
- Acanthicus adonis Isbrücker & Nijssen, 1988

Species of fish

Acanthicus adonis, the adonis pleco or polka dot lyre-tail pleco, is a species of freshwater ray-finned fish belonging to the family Loricariidae, the suckermouth armoured catfishes, and the subfamily Hypostominae, the suckermouth catfishes. This species is found in South America.

== Taxonomy ==
Acanthicus adonis was first formally described in 1988 by the Dutch ichthyologists Isaäc J. H. Isbrücker and Han Nijssen with its type locality given as Cametá on the Tocantins River at 0°14'S, 49°30.5'W in the Brazilian state of Pará. Eschmeyer's Catalog of Fishes classified the genus Acanthicus in the subfamily Hypostominae, the suckermouth catfishes, within the suckermouth armored catfish family Loricariidae.

Individuals resembling the species have also been recorded from Amazonian Peru.

== Etymology ==
Acanthicus adonis is classified in the genus Acanthicus which is derived from the Greek akánthinos, meaning "thorny", alluding to entire upper surface of the head of A. hystrix, the type species, being armed with long erectile odontodes. The specific name, adonis, is from Greek mythology, where Adonis was a handsome young man loved by the goddess Aphrodite, here referring to the attractive spotted juvenile colour pattern.

== Appearance ==
Acanthicus adonis is among the largest armored catfish species and reaches a length of 1 m (3.3 ft).

It is dark brown to black with numerous white spots as a juvenile. As the fish matures, the spots become less numerous and smaller, often disappearing entirely in large adults. Its close relative A. hystrix always lack white spots, regardless of age. In contrast, A. adonis lacks the vermiculated pattern often (but not always) found on the underparts of A. hystrix.

== Distribution and habitat ==
Acanthicus adonis is found in South America where it has been recorded from the Tocantins River basin in Brazil, in the Solimões River at the triple border between Brazil, Colombia and Peru, and in the Yujo River basin, part of the Ucayali River basin, in Peru. This catfish is found in white and clear water rivers where it is a demersal species. These fish are opportunistic omnivores.

== Utilisation ==
Acanthicus adonis is occasionally seen in the aquarium trade, but its massive adult size and territorially aggressive behavior means that a very large tank is required.
