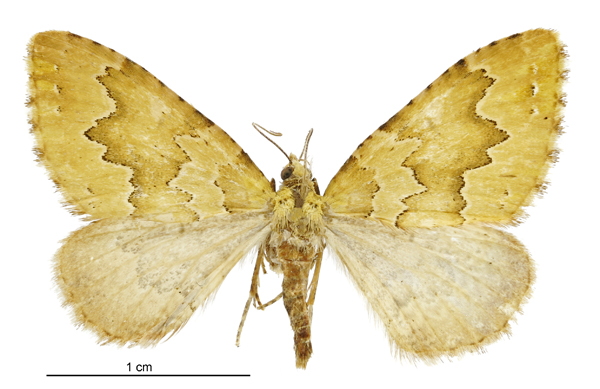
- Female
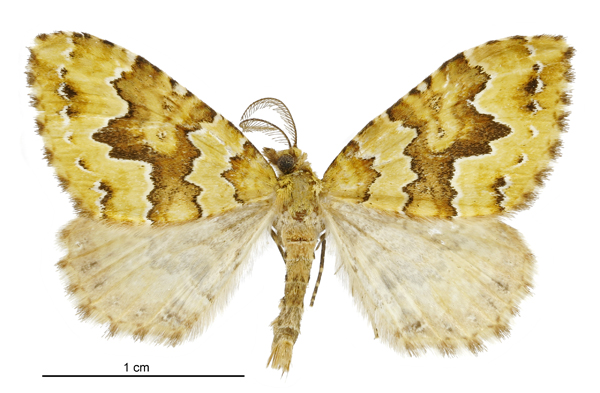
- Male

Scientific classification
- Kingdom: Animalia
- Phylum: Arthropoda
- Clade: Pancrustacea
- Class: Insecta
- Order: Lepidoptera
- Family: Geometridae
- Genus: Asaphodes
- Species: A. philpotti

Binomial name
- Asaphodes philpotti (Prout, 1927)

Synonyms
- Xanthorhoe philpotti Prout, 1927; Larentia philpotti (Prout, 1927)

= Asaphodes philpotti =

Species of moth

Asaphodes philpotti, also known as the bright green carpet moth, is a moth in the family Geometridae. It is endemic to New Zealand and has been found from the central North Island as well as in the South Island. This species inhabits wet native forest and larvae are hosted by species in the genera Hydrocotyle and Cardamine.

== Taxonomy ==
This species was first described by Louis Beethoven Prout in 1927 and named Xanthorhoe philpotti. Prout named this species in honour of Alfred Philpott, the entomologist who recognised that two separate species were mixed as Xanthorhoe beata. In 1939 Prout placed this species in the genus Larentia. This placement was not accepted by New Zealand taxonomists. In 1988 J. S. Dugdale placed this species in the genus Asaphodes. The male lectotype, collected at Lake Wakatipu, is held at the Natural History Museum, London.

== Description ==
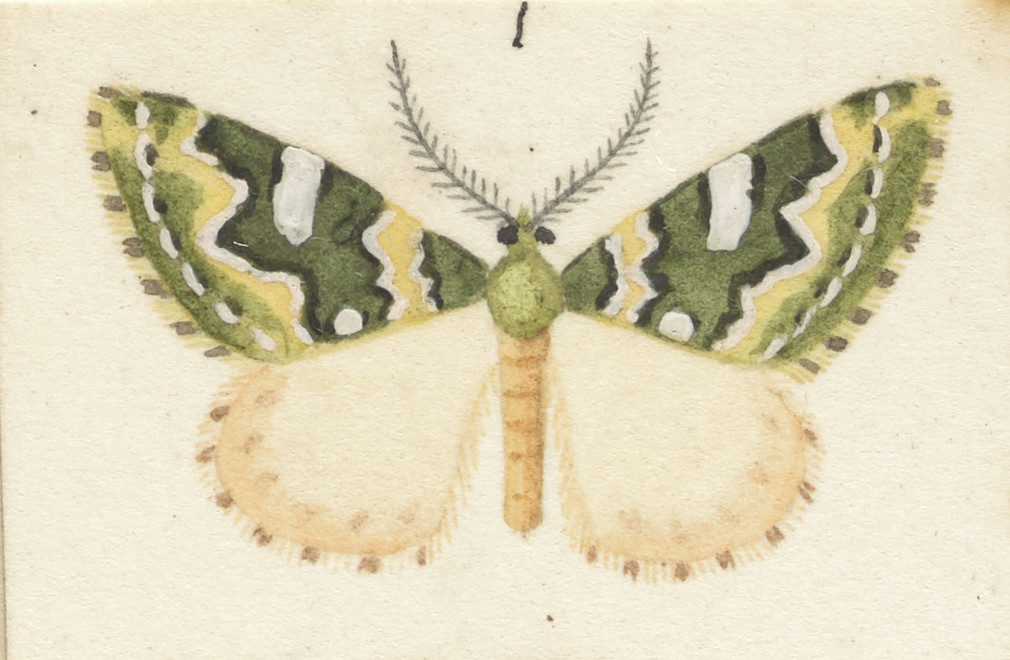
Male A. philpotti illustrated by George Hudson under the name A. beata.

Prout stated that one of the distinguishing features between A. beata and A. philpotti is the black discal spot on the forewings of A. beata which is absent or very faintly present on the forewings of A. philpotti.

== Distribution ==
This species is endemic to New Zealand and can be found from the central North Island and the South Island. This species has been collected at the type locality of Lake Wakatipu as well as in Dunedin, Wairaurahiri River in Southland, and Wainuiomata. It has also been observed on the West Coast as well as in Takaka. The range of this species has undergone contraction and it is now regarded as locally extinct in Invercargill.

== Habitat and hosts ==
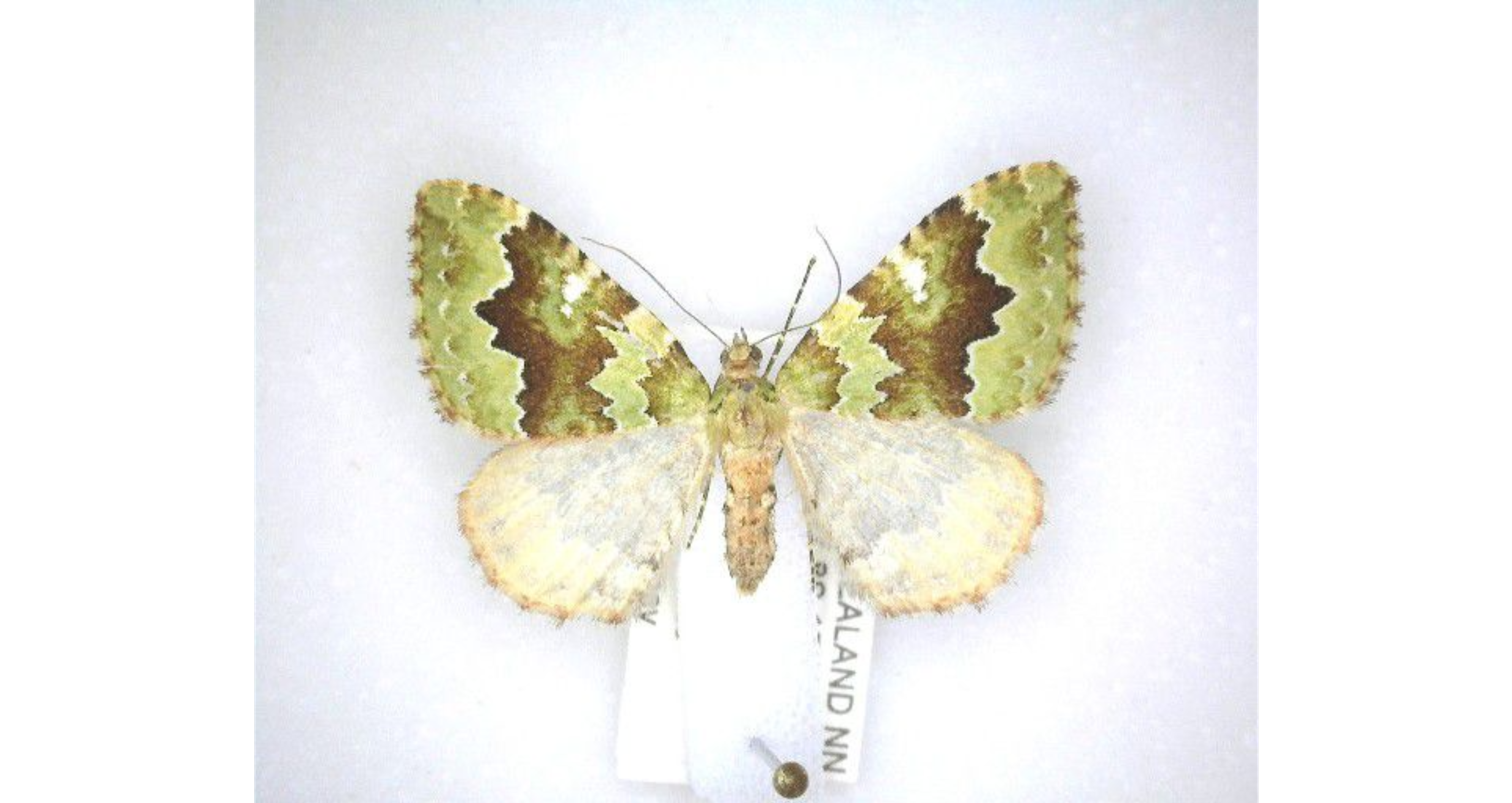
BOLD AEE2265 cf. Asaphodes philpotti

The preferred habitat of this species is native forest preferably with high rainfall. Larvae from this species have been reared on, and have also been observed feeding on, species in the genera Hydrocotyle and Cardamine.

== Behaviour ==
Adults are on the wing from January to March.
