= Andonis Manganaris-Decavalles =

Greek-born American writer (1920–2008)

- Born: Andonis George Manganaris-Decavalles; January 25, 1920; Alexandria, Egypt
- Died: June 9, 2008 (aged 88); Madison, New Jersey, U.S.
- Education: University of Athens; Northwestern University
- Occupations: Poet, professor
- Spouse: Kallioppe Kokinos Decavalles
- Writing career
- Period: 1952–2008

Andonis George Manganaris-Decavalles (Greek: Αντώνης Γιώργιος Μαγκανάρης-Δεκαβάλλες; January 25, 1920 – June 9, 2008), known under his pen name of Andonis Decavalles, was a Greek-American poet and professor of literature. Described by M. Byron Raizis as "the outstanding poet of the Greek diaspora in America," Decavalles published poetry, translations, and literary essays in a wide variety of American and Greek journals and was the author of 5 volumes of original poetry in Greek. A volume of his selected poems was translated into English by Kimon Friar. He authored Greek translations of T. S. Eliot's Four Quartets and the poetry of W. H. Auden, and he translated works of Greek writers into English, including Odysseus Elytis. In 1977 he was awarded the Academy of Athens Poetry Award for his book Armoi, Κaravia, Lytra [Greek: Αρμοί, Καράβια, Λύτρα; Joints, Ships, Ransoms], the first writer of the Greek diaspora to be so honored.

Decavalles is a poet in the modernist tradition. He came to prominence through his translation into Greek of Eliot's Four Quartets. He wrote his doctoral dissertation on another modernist poet who influenced Eliot, Ezra Pound. Among Greek poets, Decavalles was most influenced by Giorgos Seferis and Odysseus Elytis, both identified with the modernist movement. Decavalles's own poetry exhibits many of the main traits of modernism, according to translator and critic Kimon Friar. He plays with, or mixes, genres (as in his self-described "festive elegies"). He offers complex symbols for readers to ponder and interpret—a Greek trireme, a well, an urn. While his poems are deeply personal, in the lyric tradition, he engages the personal with larger issues and contexts. His poems do not confine themselves to formal structures, but in "the organic shape that each particular poem imposes on the poet," which "has more to do with the manipulation of images, meaning, and musicality than with deliberate structure"

== Biography ==
=== Early life ===
Decavalles was born in Alexandria, Egypt, to George Andonis Manganaris and Maria Decavalles, originally from the Cycladic island of Sifnos. Decavalles came from a line of Greek patriots. His paternal great-grandfather George Manganaris and great-granduncle Deacon Avramios received the Prize of Valor for their part in the Greek War of Independence. Nikolaos Chrysogelos (1780–1858), his maternal great-granduncle, was a fighter in the War of Independence in 1821 and, later, was the first Minister of Education in the newly formed independent Greek State. Decavalles spent most of his childhood and adult summers on Sifnos. Decavalles adopted his mother's family name as his nom de plume in honor of his maternal grandfather, a poet of local prominence.

=== Education and early career ===
Decavalles's early education was in the Greek schools in Alexandria. Upon graduating from gymnasium (high school), he began to study law at the University of Athens. From 1940 to 1944, he served as an officer in the Greek Royal Navy with Allied Middle East Forces. After completing his education after the war (he received his master of laws degree [LL.M.] in 1947), he practiced law in Athens and worked as a translator and assistant to the Legal and Economic Advisers of the Economic Administration of the American Economic Mission to Greece.

Beginning in his years at gymnasium and throughout the war, Decavalles wrote formal poetry and short stories, some of which were published in Alexandrian Greek dailies. From 1952 to 1954 he was a reviewer of British literary publications for the British Council on the Greek National Broadcasting Network. He also translated and arranged several British and American plays that were broadcast on the same network.

=== Graduate studies and academic work ===
In 1954, he was awarded a Schaffer fellowship for Graduate English studies at Northwestern University, where he received his M.A. and PhD in 1960. His doctoral dissertation was Ezra Pound and the Mediterranean World. During his doctoral studies, he taught at the University of Massachusetts (1958–1959), The City College of New York (1959), New York University, and Brooklyn College (1959–1960); upon completing his degree he was appointed to the faculty at Fairleigh Dickinson University in Madison, N.J. He taught comparative literature there from 1961 to 1992. He retired as an Emeritus Distinguished Professor. From 1960 to 1983 he was the Executive Editor as well as a contributor of articles and translations to The Charioteer: An Annual Review of Modern Greek Culture.

=== Marriage and children ===
In 1961 Decavalles married Kallioppe Kokinos, a Greek born in Romania. They had three daughters, Anna Nausicaa (b. 1963), Maria Daphne (b. 1964), and Georgia Artemis (b. 1966).

=== Death ===
Decavalles died at home in Madison, N.J. on June 9, 2008, and was buried on Sifnos.

== Published works ==
From 1947 to 1949, with the encouragement of novelist Stratis Myrivilis, he wrote the poems that were published in his two first books: Nimoule-Gondokoro [Νιμούλε-Γοντοκόρο] in 1949 and Akis [Ακίς][a] in 1950. At the same time he was hard at work on the challenge of translating T.S. Eliot's Four Quartets into Greek, a task that took four years. The volume, with a long introduction, essays and extensive commentary, was published in 1952. His volume of poems Okeanides [Ωκεανίδες] appeared in 1970. His Greek poetry appeared in leading Greek quarterlies and, later, his verse in translation was published in journals such as Poetry (Chicago), Saturday Review, and The Literary Review. He contributed essays and translations to Books Abroad, Chicago Literary Review, and Modern Language Journal. His later translations into English included those of fellow Greek poets Elytis, Seferis, and Pandelis Prevelakis and into Greek of W. B. Yeats and W. H. Auden.

His volume Armoi, Karavia, Lytra, which won the Academy of Athens prize, appeared in 1976. In 1984, an English translation of a selection of his poems appeared under the title Ransoms to Time, translated by Greek scholar and translator Kimon Friar. His final volume of Greek poems, An mas plighosi o ilios [Greek: Αν μας πληγώσει ο ηλιος; If the Sun Hurts Us], appeared in 1994.

His poems are included in several major anthologies of Greek poetry: Anthologia Apostolides; Elliniki Piisi: H Proti Metapolemiki Genia [Ανθολογία Η. Ν. Αποστολίδη ελληνίκης πoίησης: Η πρώτη μεταπολεμική γενιά: Anthology of Greek Poetry: The First Post-war Generation; and An Anthology of Modern Greek Poetry, edited by Nanos Valaoritis and Thanasis Maskaleris (2003). A 1994 book honoring his work, Andonis Manganaris-Decavalles and his Poetry, was published in Athens by the Cultural Institute of St. John the Theologian. In 2010, Themata Logotechnias Vol. 41, a quarterly publication, dedicated 80 pages to a brief anthology of Decavalles's poems, translations, and essays.

== Style and subjects ==
While located in the traditions of international modernist verse, Decavalles is also inspired by the traditions of his native Cycladic island. His verse is filled with images of the landscape and with references to the island customs. His poem “The Third Year,” for example embodies a local ritual of exhuming the bones of the dead, washing them in local wine and reburying them. He also is responsive to his adopted homeland in the northeastern United States, its beauties and its dissonances. In "Subway," a poem from his Ransoms to Time volume, Decavalles depicts a violent encounter in the New York subway. According to Anastasia Stefanidou, the violent man in the encounter stands for an aspect of contemporary America: a “contradictory, complicated, and even paranoid person who resorts to violence in order to disguise his anxieties and fears.” His language is rich and allusive.

== Critical reception ==
Kimon Friar included Decavalles in a mini-anthology of post-war Greek poets in Poetry Magazine in 1981, noting Decavalles’ second appearance in that venue. Critic John Taylor describes Decavalles as a member of the "Generation of Anguish," poets of a generation "which saw its “youth taken away," “its dreams destroyed," and its "ideologies betrayed by WWII and the Greek Civil War (1946–49) that followed." According to Taylor, his festive elegies can be situated "alongside so many other European poetic struggles with affirming and negating…. Decavalles explores the ‘dark recesses’ of affection, the deep ‘turnings’ of love, and the ‘unexpected crevices called death."

Another label applied to Decavalles by Anastasia Stefanidou is that of "a Cosmopolitan Exile" Stefanidou describes his "poetic persona" as someone who, having left the security and comfort of his home, "travels back and forth in space and time in order to reach a fuller appreciation and final reconciliation with the faces, places, values, habits, and dreams he had left behind when he embarked on the life of the cosmopolitan exile." Stefanidou posits an absolute opposition between the home island of Sifnos and America, the place of exile; they exist in different categories. For Decavalles, Sifnos is "an imagined, yet powerful, shield against modern America"; it is the poet's "exilic ‘home’" that exists in contrast to urban America and protection from "the harmful effects of modernization on the individual’s life and identity.”

Reviewing Decavalles's collection Ransoms to Time, poet and critic Rachel Hadas noted his "considerable achievement, in this well-arranged collection ... to locate, within the mythical framework, both his own subject matter and his own voice. His later poems combine wryness, modesty, joy and grief. As the book's title suggests, these poems retrieve meaning from exile, loss and death."

== Awards and citations ==
In 1961, he was a contributor to a series of broadcasts on modern American poetry for the Voice of America; in 1969 he served as Temporary Consultant to the Library of Congress for their Modern Greek collections. In 1977 he was awarded the Academy of Athens Poetry Award for his book Armoi, Karavia, Lytra. In 1978 he was visiting professor of Modern Greek literature at Columbia University. On August 4, 2019, Decavalles's memory was honored at the Cultural Center of Sifnos with a symposium, "Love of a Lifetime: From Sifnos to America and Back.” His work for the promotion of Greek literature and letters in the United States was lauded, as well as his extensive writings on the poet Odysseus Elytis. Selected poems by Decavalles were read at the event, which included a photographic record of his life.

== Bibliography ==
=== Books ===
- Nimoule-Gondokoro [Νιμούλε-Γοντοκόρο ποιήματα] (in Greek). Athens. 1949.
- Akis [Ακίς ποιήματα] (in Greek). Athens: Literary Corner [Λογοτεχνική Γωνιά]. 1950.
- T.S.Eliot: Ta Tessera Kouarteta [Τ. Σ. Ελιοτ, Τα Τέσσερα Κουαρτέττα: Απόδοση εισαγογικά δοκίμια και σχόλια: A Greek translation of Eliot's Four Quartets, with Introductory Essays and Commentary] (in Greek) (First ed.). Athens. 1952.
- T.S.Eliot: Ta Tessera Kouarteta [Τ. Σ. Ελιοτ, Τα Τέσσερα Κουαρτέττα: Απόδοση εισαγογικά δοκίμια και σχόλια: A Greek translation of Eliot's Four Quartets, with Introductory Essays and Commentary] (in Greek). Athens: Ekdosis Kastaniotis. 1992.
- The Voice of Cyprus: An Anthology of Cypriot Literature, co-editor and co-translator. New York: October House. 1965. ISBN 978-0935476088.
- Okeanides [Ωκεανίδες: Oceanids) (in Greek). Athens: Ikaros. 1970.
- Armoi, Karavia, Lytra (Αρμοί, Καράβια, Λύτρα: Joints, Ships, Ransoms (in Greek). Athens: Ekdosis ton Philon. 1976.; second edition, 1980
- Pandelis Prevelakis and the Value of a Heritage. Minneapolis: North Central Publishing. 1981.
- Ransoms to Time: Selected Poems by Andonis Decavalles. Translated from the Μodern Greek with an Introduction and Notes by Kimon Friar. Madison, Rutherford and Teaneck, N.J.: Fairleigh Dickinson University Press. 1984. ISBN 978-0838631805.
- Isaghoyi sto logotehnico ergo tou Pandeli Prevelaki [Εισαγογή στό λογοτεχνικό εργο τού Παντελή Πρεβελάκη: Introduction to the Literary Work of Pandelis Prevelakis (in Greek). Athens: Kedros. 1985.
- O Elytis apo to chryso os to asimenio piima [O Ελύτης απο το χρυσό ως το ασημένιο ποίημα] (in Greek). Athens: Kedros. 1988.

English translation: Odysseus Elytis from the Golden to the Silver Poem. New York: Pella. 1994. ISBN 978-0918618610.

- An mas plighosi o ilios [Αν μας ληγώσει ο ηλιος; If the Sun Hurts Us] (in Greek). Dhiatton publishers. 1992.
- W.H. Auden Piimata W.H. Auden Piimata [W. H. Auden Ποιήματα] (in Greek). Athens: Kedros. 2002.

=== Journal articles ===
- "Three Poets (Kazantzakis, Seferis and Elytis): Notes in Passing". The Charioteer: An Annual Review of Modern Greek Culture. 22–23: 16–22. 1980–1981.
- "Lorentzatos's Search for the Lost Center," an essay-review on Zissimos Lorentzatos' The Lost Center and Other Essays in Greek Poetry (Princeton University Press, 1980)". Balkan Studies. 23 (1): 237–255. Spring 1982.
- "Maria Nefeli and the Changeful Sameness of Elytis: Variation on a Theme". The Charioteer. 24–25. 1982–1983.

=== Articles in encyclopedias ===
Entries on Greek Cypriot Literature; Odysseus Elytis; Kostis Palamas; Pandelis Prevelakis; George Seferis; Angelos Sikelianos; and Angelos Terzakis in Encyclopedia of World Literature in the 20th Century. 4 volumes. New York: Frederick Ungar Publishing Co., 1981.

=== Translations ===
Translations into Modern Greek of Kimon Friar's essays “The Stone Eyes of Medusa,” “Myth and Metaphysics,” and “Poets and Politics,” together with translations of ten poems of W.B. Yeats. In Kimon Friar's Ta Petrina Matia tis Medhousas: Dokimia [Τα πέτρινα μάτια τής Μέδουσας: Δοκίμια; The Stone Eyes of the Medusa: Essays], Athens: Kedros Publishers, 1981.

Andonis Decavalles and Kimon Friar. Translations from the original Greek of selected poems from Odysseus Elytis’ Maria Nefeli, The Charioteer 24–25 (1982/1983): 59–78.
