= Venus and Adonis (Rubens, 1614) =

Painting by Peter Paul Rubens

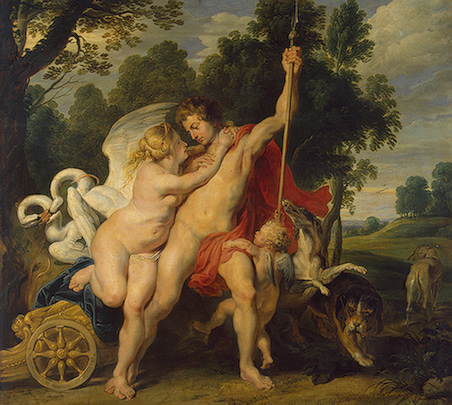
Venus and Adonis (c. 1614) by Rubens

Venus and Adonis is an oil on canvas painting by Peter Paul Rubens and his studio, executed c. 1614, now in the Hermitage Museum, in Saint Petersburg. It is a version of an autograph work from 1609 now in the Museum Kunstpalast in Düsseldorf, replacing its rocky background with Venus's attribute of a golden chariot. A third version was in the Kaiser-Friedrich-Museum in Berlin until being destroyed during World War Two.

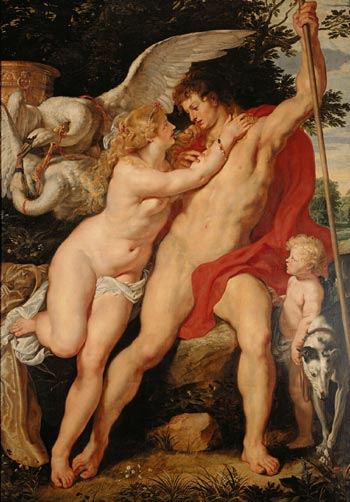
The Kunst Palast version

The main figures are by Rubens himself, whilst other areas were painted by his students, with the landscape now attributed to Lucas van Uden or Jan Wildens and the dogs by Wildens. It was in private collections in Brussels such as that of Carl de Cobenzel until 1768, when a collector sold it to the Hermitage.
