= The Birth of Adonis =

Painting by Titian

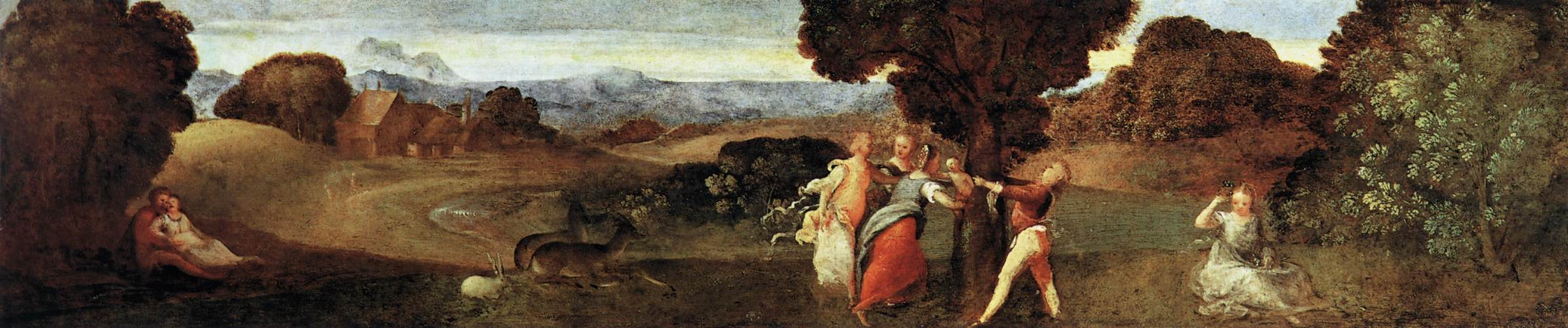
The Birth of Adonis (c. 1506-1508) by Titian

The Birth of Adonis is an oil on panel painting attributed to Titian, from c. 1506-1508. It is held in the Musei civici, in Padua. It shows the birth of Adonis as depicted in Ovid's Metamorphoses, forming a pair with The Legend of Polydoros.

It originated as part of a cassone, which entered its present home as a legacy from Emo Capodilista in 1864. Then attributed to Giorgione, it was later reattributed as an early work by Titian. Some art historians have also suggested an attribution to Romanino. At the centre is a group of figures freeing the child Adonis from his mother, who has just been transformed into a tree. To the left is a pair of lovers (referring to Adonis' conception), whilst on the right is his future lover Venus.
