= Suillellus adonis =

Scientific classification
- Domain: Eukaryota
- Kingdom: Fungi
- Division: Basidiomycota
- Class: Agaricomycetes
- Order: Boletales
- Family: Boletaceae
- Genus: Suillellus
- Species: S. adonis

Binomial name
- Suillellus adonis (Pöder & H.Ladurner) Vizzini, Simonini & Gelardi (2014)

Synonyms
- Boletus adonis Pöder & H. Ladurner (2002)

Species of bolete fungus

Suillellus adonis is a species of bolete fungus described from Croatia in 2002 and named after the Greek mythological figure Adonis for its striking beauty and vibrant red colouration. The mushroom produces fruiting bodies with deep red caps that fade to reddish-orange or yellow-orange at the margins, yellow pores that turn intensely blue when bruised, and stipes with yellow to golden colours with a dark wine-red base and powdery surface. Its flesh quickly turns blue when cut, and it has a distinctive microscopic characteristic of staining deep turquoise to blackish blue with Melzer's reagent. This apparently rare fungus has been found in Mediterranean regions of Croatia, Italy, and Cyprus, where it grows in groups near holm oak and European black pine, suggesting it forms mycorrhizal relationships with these trees.

== Taxonomy ==
The species was first formally described by the mycologists Reinhold Pöder and Heidi Ladurner in 2002 as Boletus adonis, based on specimens collected near Ustrine on the Croatian island of Cres in autumn 1997. The specific epithet adonis refers to the Greek mythological figure Adonis, alluding to the mushroom's striking beauty and vibrant red colouration.

The species was later transferred to the genus Suillellus following molecular phylogenetics studies that reorganised many members of the former genus Boletus. It belongs to what was traditionally classified as section Luridi within Boletus.

Suillellus adonis is distinguished from similar species like S. spretus (formerly Boletus spretus) by microscopic features, most notably its wider spores and strong amyloid reaction to Melzer's reagent. The authors of the species also clarified that Boletus emilei, with which it had been confused, is a nomen dubium (a name of uncertain application).

== Description ==
Suillellus adonis has a striking appearance with its vibrant colouration and distinctive features. The cap ranges from 4.5 to 11 cm in diameter and has a convex shape with an uneven surface. It has a dry, finely velvety-tomentose texture and is predominantly deep red. The colour becomes paler toward the margin, transitioning to reddish orange or yellow orange. Some specimens may display purplish-black streaks or spots across the cap surface. The underside of the cap reveals yellow to olive pores that are about 1 mm wide and distinctly maze-like (labyrinthiform). These pores stain intensely blue when bruised or damaged, a characteristic reaction in many bolete mushrooms. The tubes connected to these pores attach to the stipe (adnate) or are slightly depressed near it, measuring up to 17 mm long near the stipe but becoming shorter (3–5 mm) toward the cap margin.

The stipe measures 3.5–6.5 cm in length and 1–4 cm in thickness. It can be cylindrical or taper toward the base and is solidly constructed. The stipe colouration ranges from pale yellow to golden yellow, sometimes matching the cap colour partially or completely, while the base displays a dark wine-like (vinaceous) colour. The stipe surface is dry and distinctly covered with a powdery bloom (pruinose), which varies in colour from yellow to orange to red. When cut, the mushroom's internal flesh reveals more diagnostic features. In the cap, the flesh is whitish to pale yellow, becoming golden yellow above the tubes. The stipe flesh shows pale yellow to yellow coloration in the upper third, transitioning to dark vinaceous in the lower part. When exposed to air through cutting, the flesh quickly and strongly turns blue. The mushroom lacks any distinctive odour or taste that would aid in field identification.

Under the microscope, Suillellus adonis displays ovate to somewhat elliptic spores measuring roughly 10.5 × 6.2 μm, appearing smooth and ochraceous-brown when viewed in potassium hydroxide solution. The mushroom's cellular structure includes club-shaped basidia (spore-producing cells), scattered cystidia on the tubes, and a cap cuticle composed of interwoven, finely granulated hyphae with specialized terminal cells. A particularly distinctive microscopic feature is the strong reaction with Melzer's reagent, causing all parts of the fruiting body to stain deep turquoise to blackish blue—a characteristic that helps differentiate it from similar-looking species.

== Habitat and distribution ==
Suillellus adonis is found in Mediterranean regions, specifically recorded from Croatia and Italy. The type specimens were collected in Croatia on the island of Cres, growing among grass in a small sheep pasture near holm oak (Quercus ilex) and European black pine (Pinus nigra) at an elevation of 100 metres above sea level. This apparently rare fungus was later reported from Cyprus.

The species grows in groups (gregariously), sometimes in small clusters of two or three fruiting bodies. It appears to form mycorrhizal associations with Mediterranean trees, particularly holm oak.
