= USS Adonis =

1943 Achelous-class repair ship

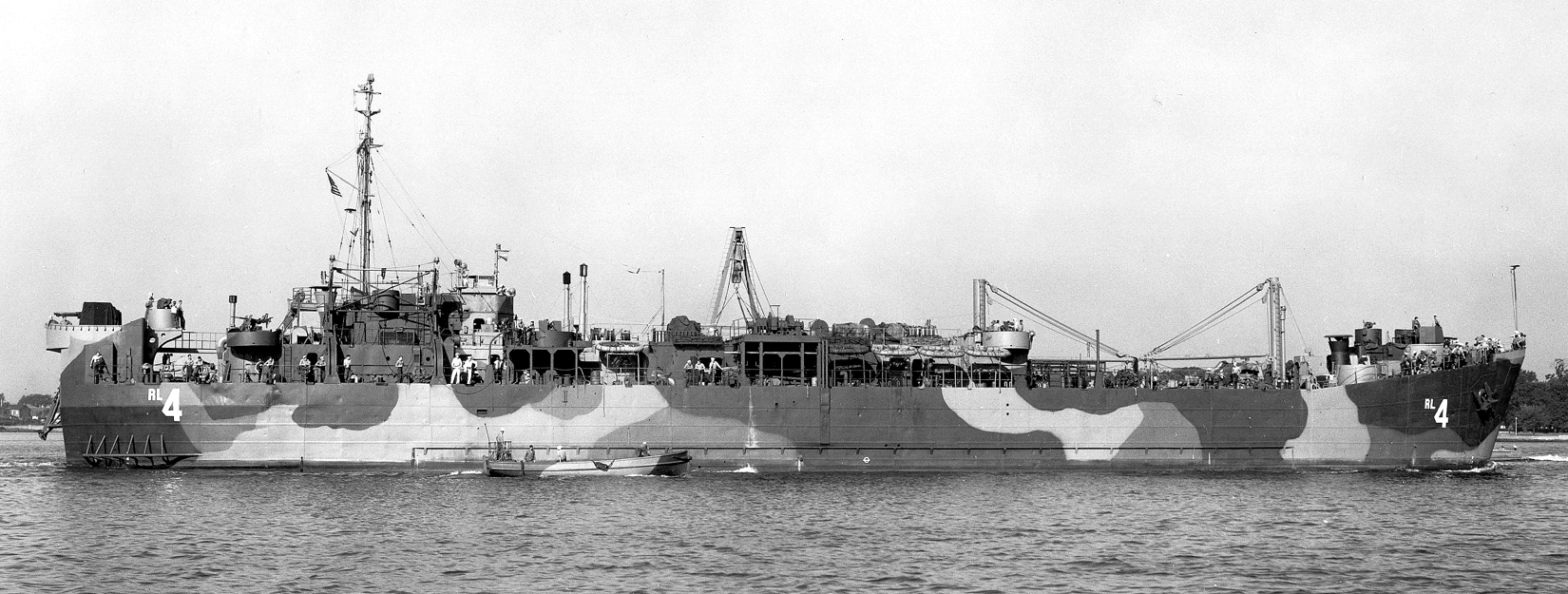
- USS Adonis off the Norfolk Naval Shipyard, 12 July 1945

History

United States
- Name: USS Adonis
- Builder: Jeffersonville Boat & Machine Company, Jeffersonville, Indiana
- Laid down: 31 March 1943
- Launched: 14 June 1943
- Commissioned: 6 August 1943
- Decommissioned: 11 October 1946
- Stricken: 1 January 1960
- Fate: Sold to private interest, 14 October 1960

General characteristics
- Class & type: Achelous-class repair ship
- Displacement: 1,781 long tons (1,810 t) light, 3,960 long tons (4,024 t) full
- Length: 328 ft (100 m)
- Beam: 50 ft (15 m)
- Draft: 11 ft 2 in (3.40 m)
- Propulsion: 2 × General Motors 12-567 diesel engines, two shafts
- Speed: 12 knots (14 mph; 22 km/h)
- Complement: 255 officers and enlisted men
- Armament: 12 × Bofors 40 mm guns (2x4,2x2), 12 × Oerlikon 20 mm cannons (6x2)

Service record
- Operations: Invasion of Normandy
- Awards: 1 Battle stars

USS Adonis (ARL-4) was one of 39 Achelous-class landing craft repair ships built for the United States Navy during World War II. Named for Adonis (a handsome youth in Greek mythology who was loved by Aphrodite), she was the only U.S. Naval vessel to bear the name.

Originally laid down as LST-83 at Jeffersonville, Indiana on 31 March 1943 by the Jeffersonville Boat & Machine Company; launched on 14 June 1943; sponsored by Mrs. Frank R. Akhurst; commissioned on 6 August 1943 at Algiers, Louisiana for transportation to Baltimore, Maryland; decommissioned on 21 August 1943 for conversion by the Bethlehem Steel Company for service as a landing craft repair ship; redesignated ARL-4 on 26 August 1943 and simultaneously named Adonis; and placed in commission on 12 November 1943.

== Service history ==
The new landing craft repair ship soon sailed to Norfolk, Virginia for shakedown training and carried out exercises in Chesapeake Bay. She then made a cruise to New York City and finally ended her training period at Boston, Massachusetts on the last day of the year. Adonis departed Boston on 3 January 1944 with a convoy bound for Halifax, Nova Scotia. The ships arrived in Halifax on the 6th and put out to sea again on 14 January beginning a transatlantic voyage to Great Britain.

The convoy reached Milford Haven, Wales on 31 January. Two days later, Adonis got under way for Devonport, England. She dropped anchor there on 5 February and commenced providing repair services to fleet units. She remained at Devonport until 26 May, and then moved to Portland Harbour. However, only a few days later, she was ordered to proceed to the assault area off the Normandy beachhead in France. Adonis got under way for her trip across the English Channel on 7 June, the day after "D-Day." She arrived off "Omaha Beach" on the 8th and began providing repair services to damaged amphibious vessels. Rough seas made the work difficult, and the repair ship frequently changed her anchorage to avoid shellfire from enemy shore batteries. On 1 August, she cleared the area and headed back to Falmouth for repairs.

The ship returned to the French coast on 25 August, anchored off "Utah Beach," and resumed her repair work. On 1 November, she sailed to Cherbourg, France to pick up stores and equipment and returned to the waters off "Omaha Beach" on the 4th. She remained there for 10 days and was then ordered back to England. Adonis reached Devonport on 15 November, resumed her maintenance work, and remained at that port through 5 May 1945. After a pause at Belfast, Northern Ireland, the ship began her voyage back to the United States and reached her home port, Norfolk, on 31 May. Upon her arrival, the vessel was overhauled and then conducted sea trials and exercises in the Chesapeake Bay. The repair ship made a run to Davisville, Rhode Island on 22 July to take on a load of pontoons and sailed for the Pacific two days later. She transited the Panama Canal on 4 August and, while en route to San Diego received word of the Japanese surrender. After reaching San Diego on the 17th, she unloaded the pontoons at Port Hueneme, California on the 27th, and got under way for Hawaii.

Upon her arrival at Pearl Harbor on 6 September, Adonis set to work converting LSMs and LCIs into troop carriers which could be used to help return military personnel to the United States. She remained in Hawaiian waters through 25 October, when the ship shaped a course for Guam where she operated until early December. She got under way for China on the 3rd, and reached Shanghai on the 12th, remaining there into early 1946. Upon leaving Shanghai on 14 March 1946 Adonis visited the Chinese ports of Taku, Chinwangtao, Hulutao, and Qingdao. She departed the latter city on 25 April and set a course for the west coast of the United States. The ship reached Astoria, Oregon on 18 May and, shortly thereafter, began preparations for her deactivation. Adonis was decommissioned on 11 October 1946 and was assigned to the Columbia River Group, Pacific Reserve Fleet, Portland. The ship remained inactive there until her name was struck from the Naval Vessel Register on 1 January 1960. She was sold to Mr. Virgil Gene Thomas of California on 14 October 1960.

== Awards ==
Adonis won one battle star for her World War II service.
