= Adonis (1874) =

Australian brigantine

Coordinates: 32.1°S 152.8°E

History

New South Wales
- Name: Adonis
- Owner: Patrick Hogan
- Port of registry: Sydney
- Ship registration number: 79/1874
- Ship official number: 71807
- Builder: Dent Jervis Bay, New South Wales, Australia
- Completed: 1874
- Fate: Wrecked 22 December 1889

General characteristics
- Type: Wood Brigantine
- Tonnage: 108 GRT
- Displacement: 104 NRT
- Length: 28.16 m
- Beam: 6.309 m
- Draught: 2.529 m

Adonis was a wooden brigantine built at Jervis Bay, New South Wales. She was wrecked on 22 December 1889, approximately 15 miles (24 km) south of Crowdy Head, when she sprang a leak whilst carrying coal between Wollongong and the Richmond River.
