= The Death of Adonis (Sebastiano del Piombo) =

1512 painting by Sebastiano del Piombo

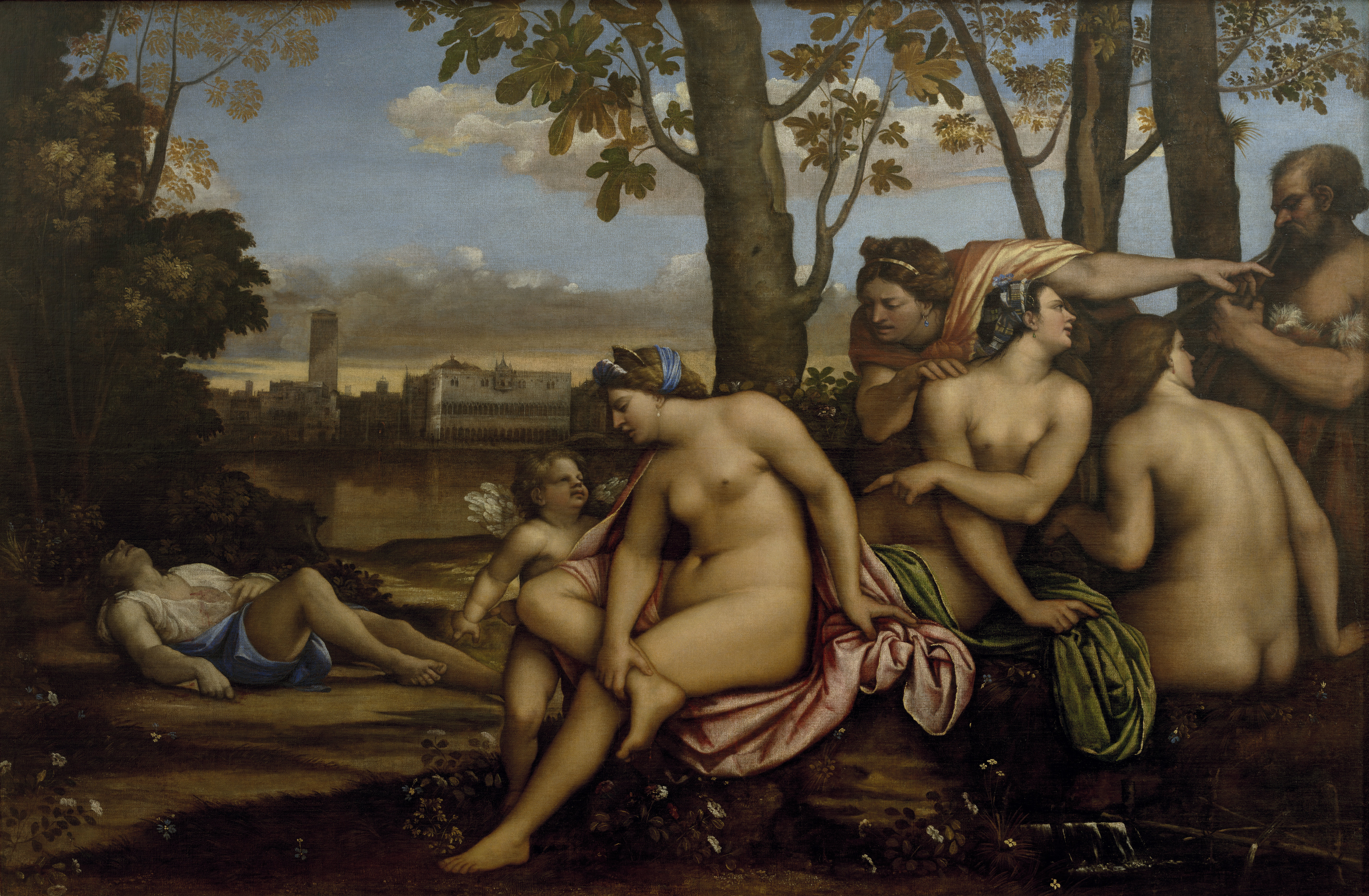
The Death of Adonis (1512) by Sebastiano del Piombo

The Death of Adonis is a 1512 oil on canvas painting by Sebastiano del Piombo, now in the Uffizi in Florence.

It was originally produced for Agostino Chigi just after the artist's arrival in Rome, summoned to assist Chigi in decorating the Villa Chigi. A 1520 inventory of the villa stated it contained "figures of more nude and beautiful women". In the background, a panorama of Venice, the artist's hometown, can be seen, with famous monuments like the Doge's Palace and various churches. The work arrived in Florence in 1587 and was held at the Palazzo Pitti.

In 1675 the painting was mentioned as being in cardinal Leopoldo de' Medici's collection, before passing to the Uffizi with a misattribution to Moretto, though Morelli restored the correct attribution.

During the 1993 Via dei Georgofili bombing, the painting was severely damaged. Its swift restoration made it a sign of the Uffizi's resilience after the tragic event.

== Bibliography ==
- (in Italian) Gloria Fossi, Uffizi, Giunti, Firenze 2004. ISBN 88-09-03675-1
