= The Death of Adonis (Rodin) =

Aphrodite mourning over Adonis's body

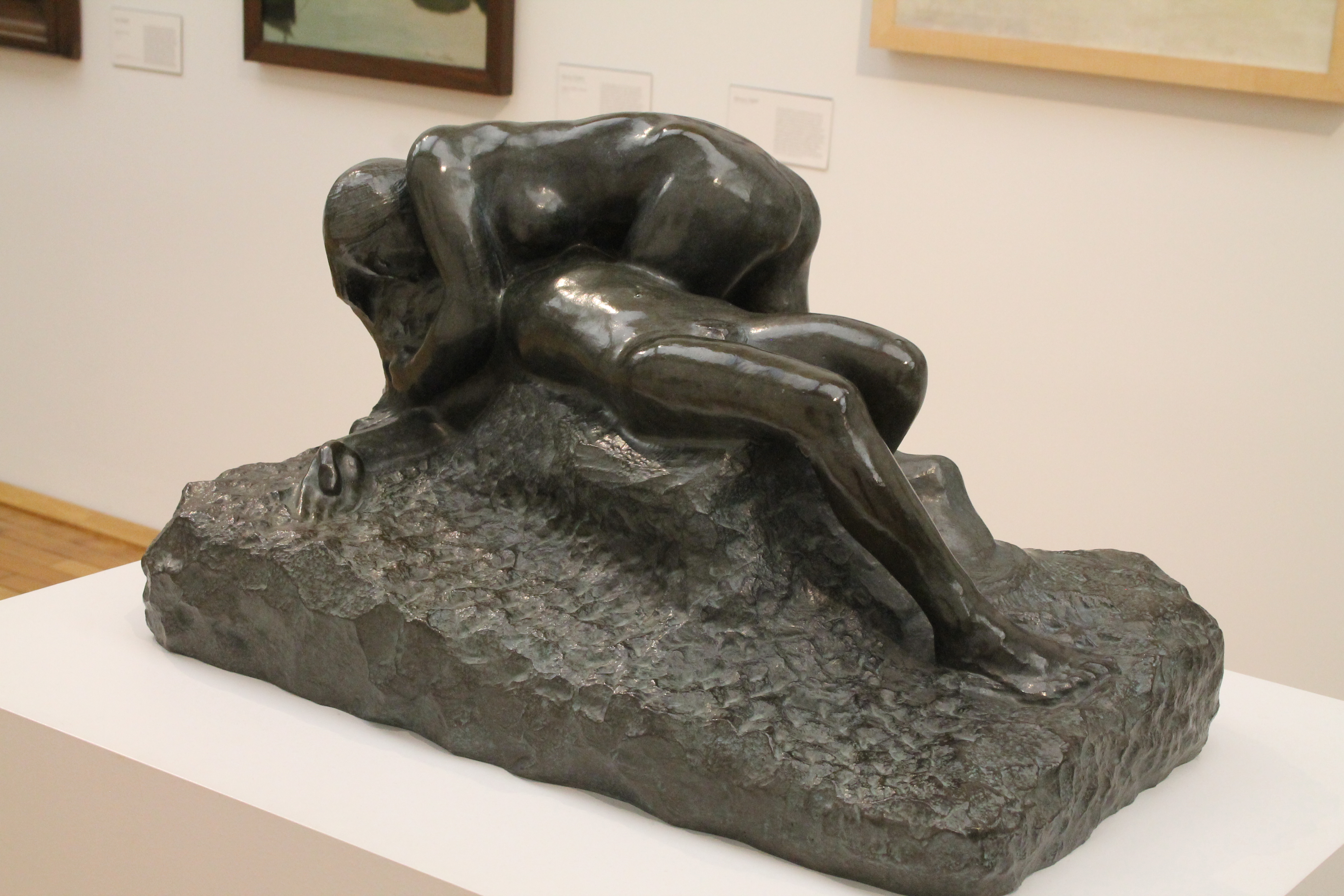
- Artist: Auguste Rodin
- Year: 1888
- Medium: Bronze
- Location: Musée d'arts de Nantes

The Death of Adonis is a white marble sculpture. It was created by Auguste Rodin and signed “A RODIN” on the base. It shows Aphrodite mourning over the body of Adonis. The main version is in the Musée Rodin and another is in the Museo Soumaya.

== History ==
As Rodin's fame grew during the 1880s, the demand for his work increased, so many of his works, which were originally created in a smaller format, began to come out of his studio, which had already grown considerably. Some of these pieces were finished compositions, based on the coupling of figures originally conceived individually; this work is an example of such a composition.

This sculpture has had different names: Idylle (Idyll), Le Printemps (Spring), Le Printemps de la vie (The Spring of Life) and Les Océanides (The Oceánides). It represents the legend of Adonis, showing Aphrodite kissing the lips of the dying youth. The piece was placed in The Gates of Hell and is located on the top, on one of the four corbels, just below The Three Shadows. The pain experienced by the mother of Cupid has its origin in the repentance of the sculptural group in the lower right corner of the portico. In this marble, the finished bodies lie in opposition to the tree with a rough surface. From this moment the artist sought perfection through works that seem unfinished, where the fragment evokes the whole.

The group of characters that make up the work was represented for the first time in the form of a drawing, in the margin of the poem "Poison" of the poet Charles Baudelaire, in the edition of the Flowers of Evil illustrated for the Editorial Gallimard. In the marble of this sculpture these verses appear: Opium increases that which has no limits / [...], delves [...], excavates pleasure and pleasures / blacks and melancholy. / And it fills the soul even more than it fits in it./ It is not worth the poison that your eyes distill / [...] lakes where my soul trembles and looks inverted / and my dreams flow / to be satiated in those bitter vortices.

== Inspiration ==
Rodin made numerous studies of the attitudes of human expressions, inspired by allegories and Greek mythologies. His main sources of inspiration were the literary works of Ovid, Dante and Baudelaire. Myths and characters came to life through different materials and gave them a unique interpretation.

Adonis was born from the Cypriot tree into which the gods converted his mother, and was the fruit of the incestuous union between Myrrha and her father Ciniras, king of Pafos. He was raised by nymphs and when hunting with Venus, a wild boar attacked him.

This work represents the devastating moment that Venus had experienced before the imminent death of her beloved. Agonising, Adonis gives birth to the anemones, a symbol of rebirth that in the Middle Ages were transformed into white roses which, dyed with blood, became the emblem of love. Rodin managed to get the goddess to transmit to the spectator her desire to return her beloved to life, reflected in her face full of despair and at the same time of tenderness. His hair fused to the rock shows the timelessness that the author explored at the beginning of the 1880s.

The position of Pena is that of the desolate Venus of this work. The mythical story of Ovid tells how the goddess of beauty mourns the death of her companion. In this work, the inert hand of Adonis is subject to the trunk that he will water with his own blood, and that in combination with the nectar, will make the anemone sprout. Other stories tell that his blood watered the white roses, which when dyed became the most precious gift of love.

The mythological theme was recurrent in Rodin's production and refers to the myth in which Venus fell in love with Adonis, and after dying under the onslaught of the boar, arrived in the underworld, where Persephone, the wife of Pluto, Lord of the demons, also falls in love with him. Both women request Zeus to resuscitate him, which he grants, but Adonis could not be with both at the same time, since Zeus arranges that during the day he is with Venus and at night with Persephone.

The other work with which Rodin completes the Greek myth of Adonis, is The Awakening of Adonis.

== See also ==
- List of sculptures by Auguste Rodin
