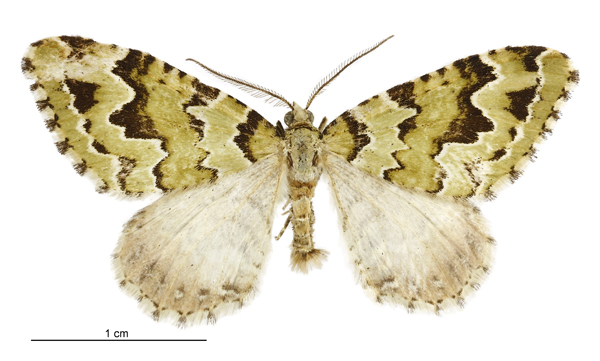
- Male
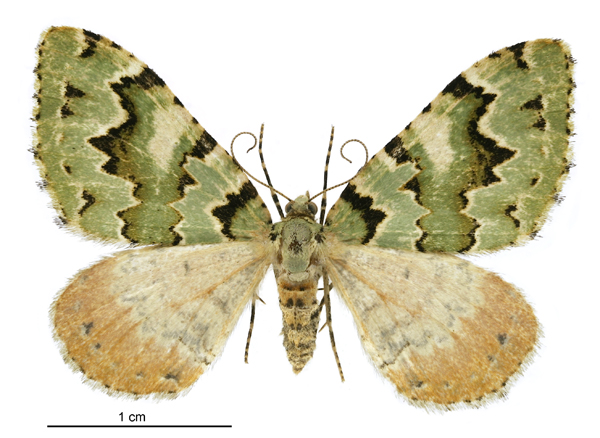
- Female

Scientific classification
- Kingdom: Animalia
- Phylum: Arthropoda
- Clade: Pancrustacea
- Class: Insecta
- Order: Lepidoptera
- Family: Geometridae
- Genus: Asaphodes
- Species: A. adonis

Binomial name
- Asaphodes adonis (Hudson, 1898)

Synonyms
- Xanthorhoe adonis Hudson, 1898; Larentia adonis (Hudson, 1898)

= Asaphodes adonis =

Species of moth endemic to New Zealand

Asaphodes adonis (also known as the exquisite carpet moth) is a species of moth in the family Geometridae. It is endemic to the South Island of New Zealand. It is found in native forest at altitudes of between 300 and 1200 metres. The larvae of A. adonis are extremely sluggish in habit, resting on stems of food plant and feeding on the dead portions. Larvae have been reared on species of Ranunculus. George Hudson stated that a larval food plant of this species is Nasturtium officinale. Adults are on the wing in January and February. It can be found during the day resting on tree trunks, camouflaged against similar coloured lichen growth.

== Taxonomy ==
This species was first described by George Vernon Hudson in 1898 under the name Xanthorhoe adonis using specimens collected at Castle Hill or at the Routeburn. Hudson went on to discuss and illustrate this species in his book The butterflies and moths of New Zealand. He then described the larvae of this species in his 1939 publication A supplement to the butterflies and moths of New Zealand. In 1939 Louis Beethoven Prout placed this species in the genus Larentia. This placement was not accepted by New Zealand taxonomists. In 1971 J. S. Dugdale placed this species in the genus Asaphodes. In 1988 Dugdale affirmed this placement in his catalogue of New Zealand Lepidoptera. The type specimens have not been located at Te Papa. Dugdale presumed that the syntype series of specimens Hudson sent to Meyrick is held in the Natural History Museum, London.

== Description ==
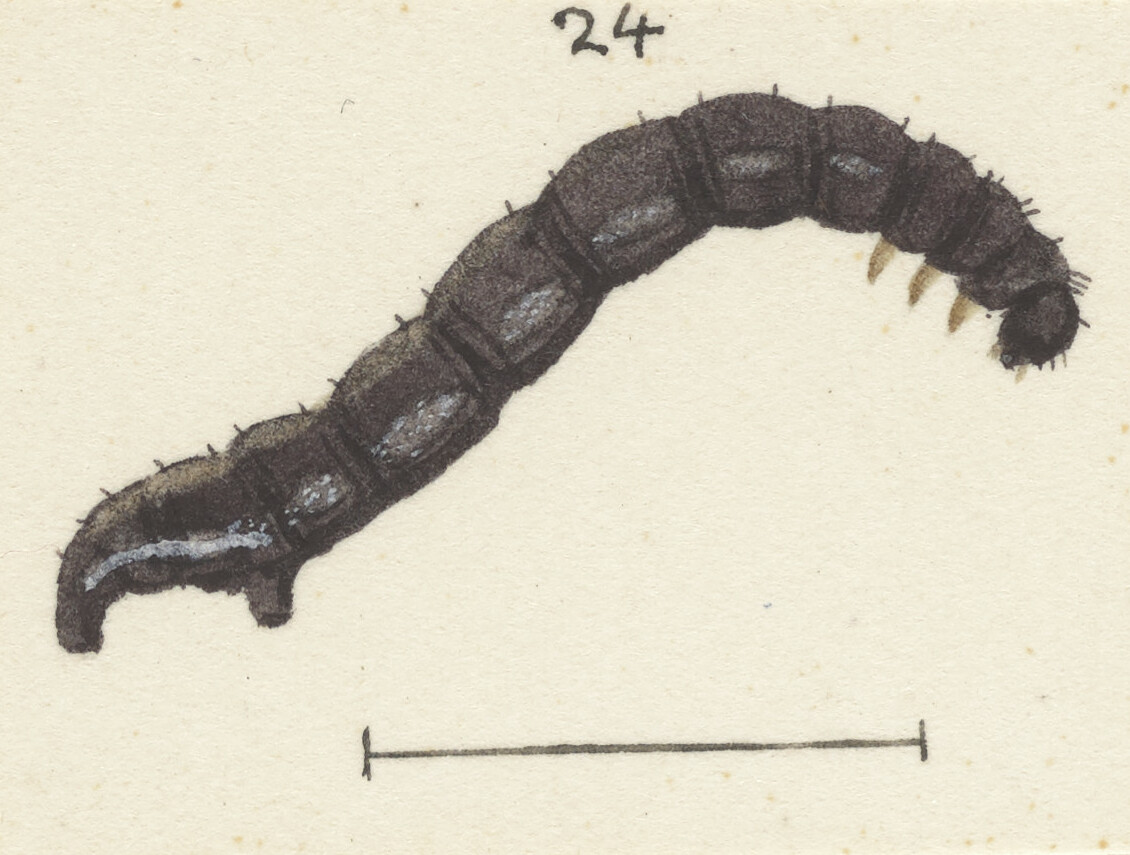
Larva of A. adonis.

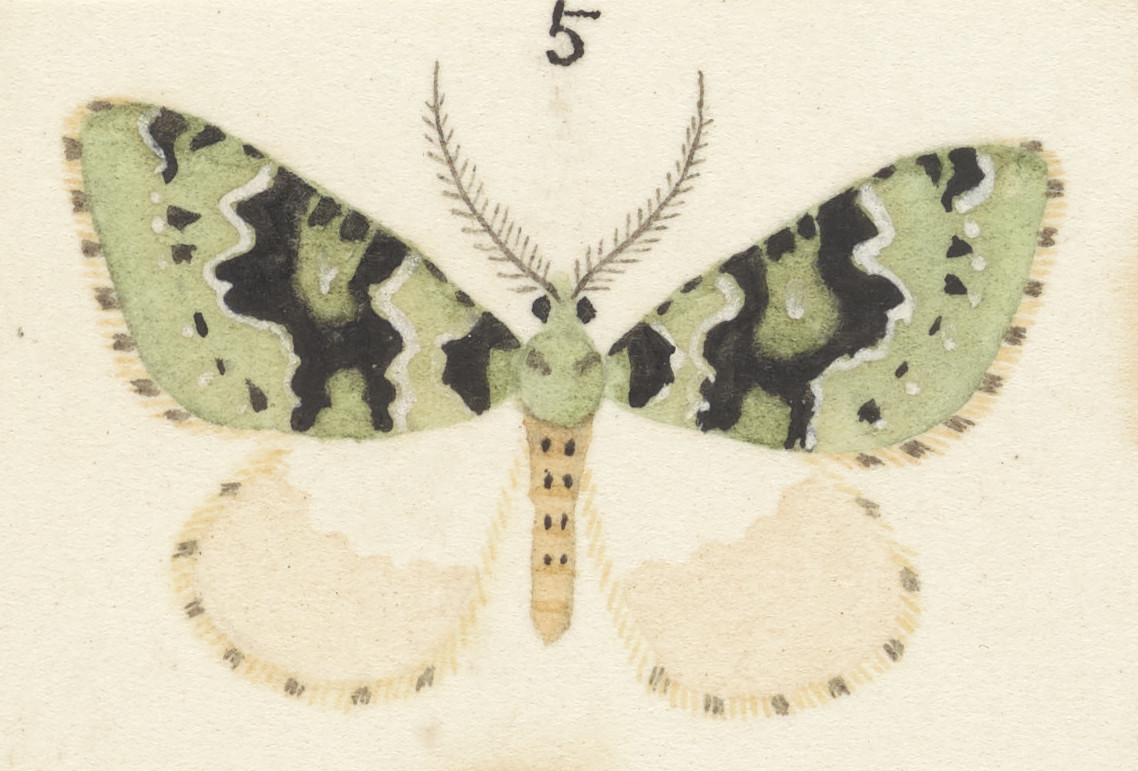
Male A. adonis illustrated by Hudson.

Hudson described the egg and larvae of this species as follows:

The egg, which is laid on its side, is about 1/40th inch in length, oval, not flattened, and without concavity when first deposited; there are a few very shallow, large, hexagonal depressions; the colour is very pale green, turning deep ochreous six days after being laid, and later to dull grey. The length of the larva, when first hatched, is about 1/16th inch; general colour dull ochreous, slightly tinged with green; head very large, brownish-ochreous; a broad, wavy, green lateral line; a very slender indistinct dorsal line, on anterior portion only; a few short stout bristles, most numerous on anal segment; prolegs very large and close together. The larva is very sluggish in habit, mostly standing erect on prolegs, with head and anterior portions rolled up. The egg-shell is not eaten on emergence. Foodplant watercress (Nasturtium officinale.)
When nearly full-grown the larva is about 3/4 inch long, stout, subcylindrical, considerably flattened, slightly tapering at each end, with prominent lateral ridge; black, faintly tinged with claret colour; an indistinct series of paler marks on midback, becoming confluent posteriorly, and forming a more conspicuous, wide, pale, dorsal line; lateral ridge dotted with white posteriorly; general surface somewhat roughened, giving larva very dull appearance; a few very short, thick bristles; legs pale brownish-yellow; prolegs black, moderately, close together.

Hudson originally described the adults of species as follows:

The expansion of the wings is 1 inch. The fore-wings are vivid green : there is a broad, wavy, black transverse line near the base; a somewhat broken line at about one-third, much broader on the costa and edged with white towards the base; a very conspicuous lima// black line at two-thirds, shaded towards the base, and sharply edged with white towards flic termen; between this line and the termen there are several black marks, forming another extremely broken transverse line. The hind-wings arc pale orange-brown, with a faint grey central band.

A. adonis has vivid green forewings with dark coloured broad wavy lines edged with white which form a distinctive pattern. The dark coloured wavy lines can vary considerably in thickness. The hind wings are a pale orange shaded brown. This species can be distinguished from its close relative Asaphodes beata by the colour of its hind wings.

== Distribution and habitat ==
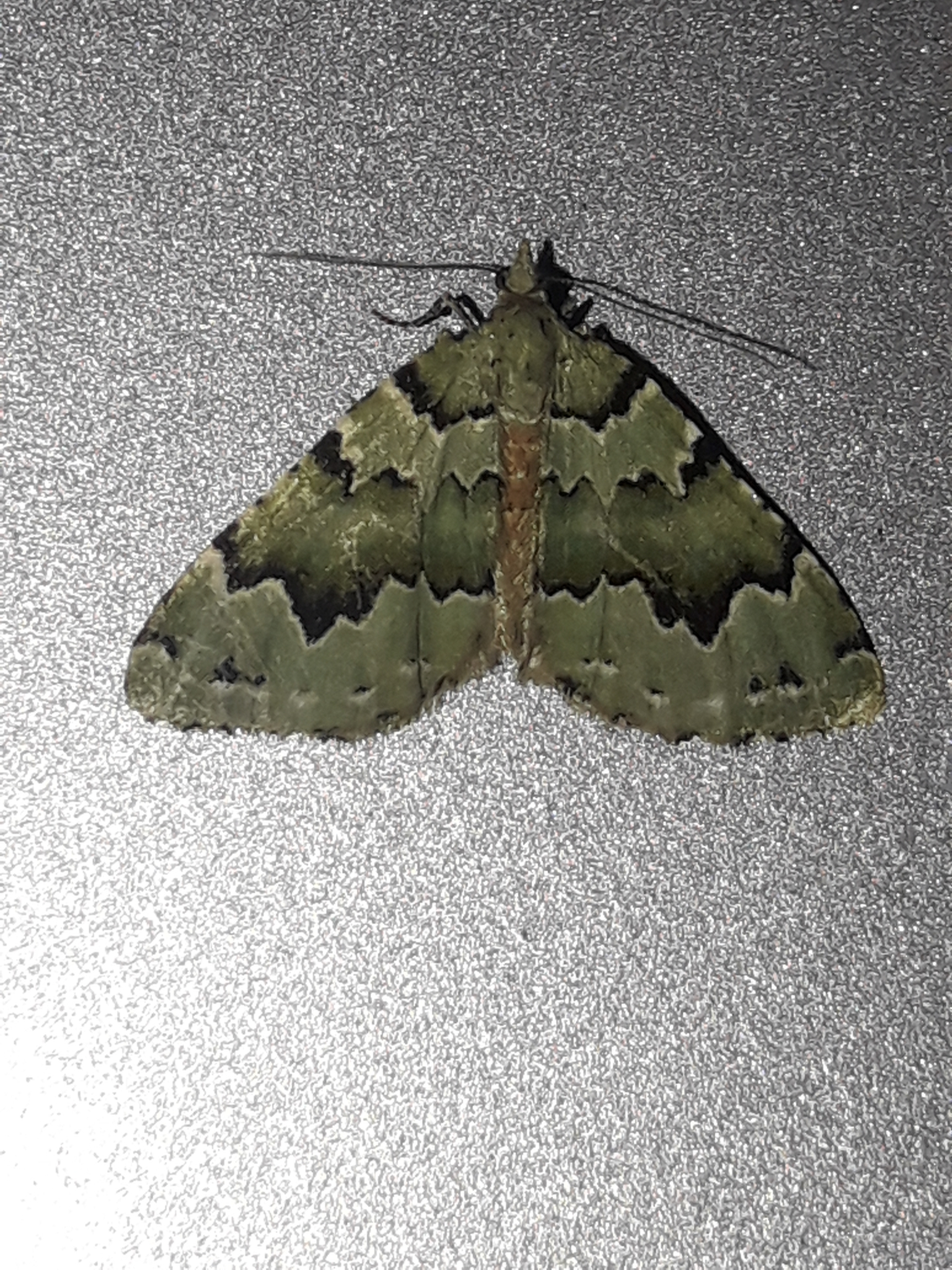
Observation of live moth.

This species is endemic to New Zealand and is found in the South Island only. It is regarded as uncommon and is found in native forest in the South Island at altitudes of between 300 and 1200 metres. A. adonis have been observed at Castle Hill and Lake Wakatipu, Lake Harris track, Bold Peak in Otago, Mt Aspiring Station, and in the Te Anau Ecological District.

== Behaviour ==
The larvae of A. adonis are extremely sluggish in habit, resting on stems of food plant and feeding on the dead portions. In its natural state it evidently lives throughout the winter probably feeding during the milder periods. None of the larvae kept in captivity reached the pupa state. Adults of this species are on the wing in January and February. It can be found during the day resting on tree trunks, camouflaged against similar coloured lichen growth.

== Host plant ==
Larvae of A. adonis have been reared on species of Ranunculus. Hudson stated that the larval food plant of this species was Nasturtium officinale.
