= Brettus adonis =

Scientific classification
- Kingdom: Animalia
- Phylum: Arthropoda
- Subphylum: Chelicerata
- Class: Arachnida
- Order: Araneae
- Infraorder: Araneomorphae
- Family: Salticidae
- Genus: Brettus
- Species: B. adonis

Binomial name
- Brettus adonis Simon, 1900

Species of spider

Brettus adonis, is a species of spider of the genus Brettus. It is endemic to Sri Lanka.

== Diet and behaviour ==
Brettus adonis preys upon other spiders, mainly web-building ones. Members of this species do not stick to any kind of spider silk, and will invade the webs of other spiders to feed on them. To capture a web-building spider, they typically pluck upon the silken strings at the edge of the web with their pedipalps, varying how they pluck until an effective rhythm is found. Then, they repeat this manner of plucking and lure the spider over(aggressive mimicry), capturing or stabbing their prey in a lunging attack.

Apart from spiders, Brettus adonis will also prey on insects, although they prefer to eat web-building spiders. They usually capture insects via close range lunging attacks.
