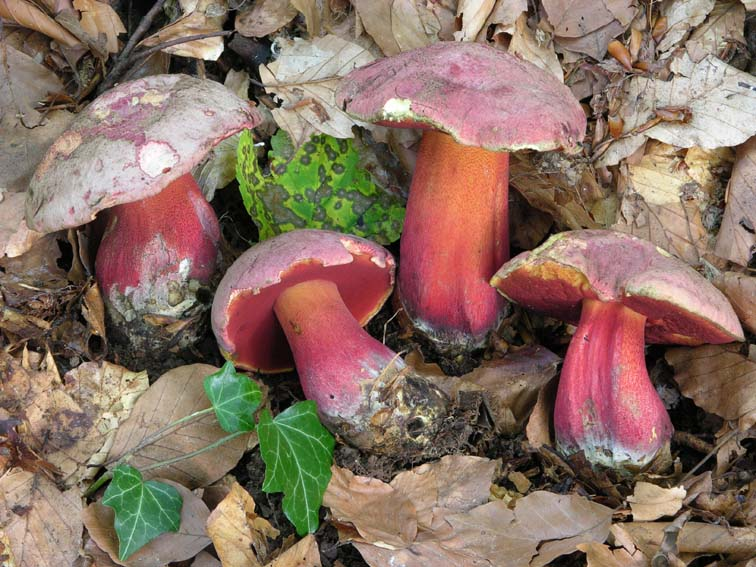

Scientific classification
- Kingdom: Fungi
- Division: Basidiomycota
- Class: Agaricomycetes
- Order: Boletales
- Family: Boletaceae
- Genus: Rubroboletus
- Species: R. rubrosanguineus

Binomial name
- Rubroboletus rubrosanguineus (Cheype) Kuan Zhao & Zhu L.Yang (2014)

Synonyms
- Boletus splendidus subsp. moseri Singer & Kuthan (1976); Boletus rubrosanguineus Cheype (1983)

= Rubroboletus rubrosanguineus =

Species of fungus

Rubroboletus rubrosanguineus
- Mycological characteristics
- Pores on hymenium
- Cap is convex
- Hymenium is adnate
- Stipe is bare
- Spore print is olive-brown
- Ecology is mycorrhizal
- Edibility is unknown

Rubroboletus rubrosanguineus is a species of bolete fungus in the family Boletaceae that is found in Europe.

== Taxonomy ==
The bolete was first described from the former Czechoslovakia as a subspecies of Boletus splendidus (now Boletus legaliae), and later promoted to species status (as Boletus rubrosanguineus) by Jean-Louis Cheype in 1983. Its species name comes from the Latin words ruber "red" and sanguineus "bloody". It was transferred to the new genus Rubroboletus in 2014 along with several allied reddish, blue-staining bolete species. Molecular analysis of eight of the member species found it was most closely related to Rubroboletus sinicus and formed a larger clade with R. satanas and R. pulchrotinctus

== Description ==
The large stout fruit bodies have light to dark grey or grey-brown caps, often with pinkish margins, that may reach 15 cm (6 in) in diameter. Initially hemispherical (dome-shaped), they become convex to flat as they mature. The pores are red, the tubes yellow and the flesh is pale yellow, and all become blue when bruised. The stout stipe is bulbous or cylindrical at the base and yellow at the top and pink- to orange-red at its lower parts, and patterned in a fine darker orange or red reticulation. The mushrooms smell of hay when fresh or dried. It closely resembles R. legaliae, though the latter species grows in deciduous forests.

== Habitat and distribution ==
Rubroboletus rubrosanguineus is found in eastern Europe, east to the Caucasus. It is mycorrhizal, forming associations with spruce (Picea) and fir (Abies), and generally found in montane habitats. The fungus is classified as "critically endangered" in a Redlist of fungi of the Czech Republic.
