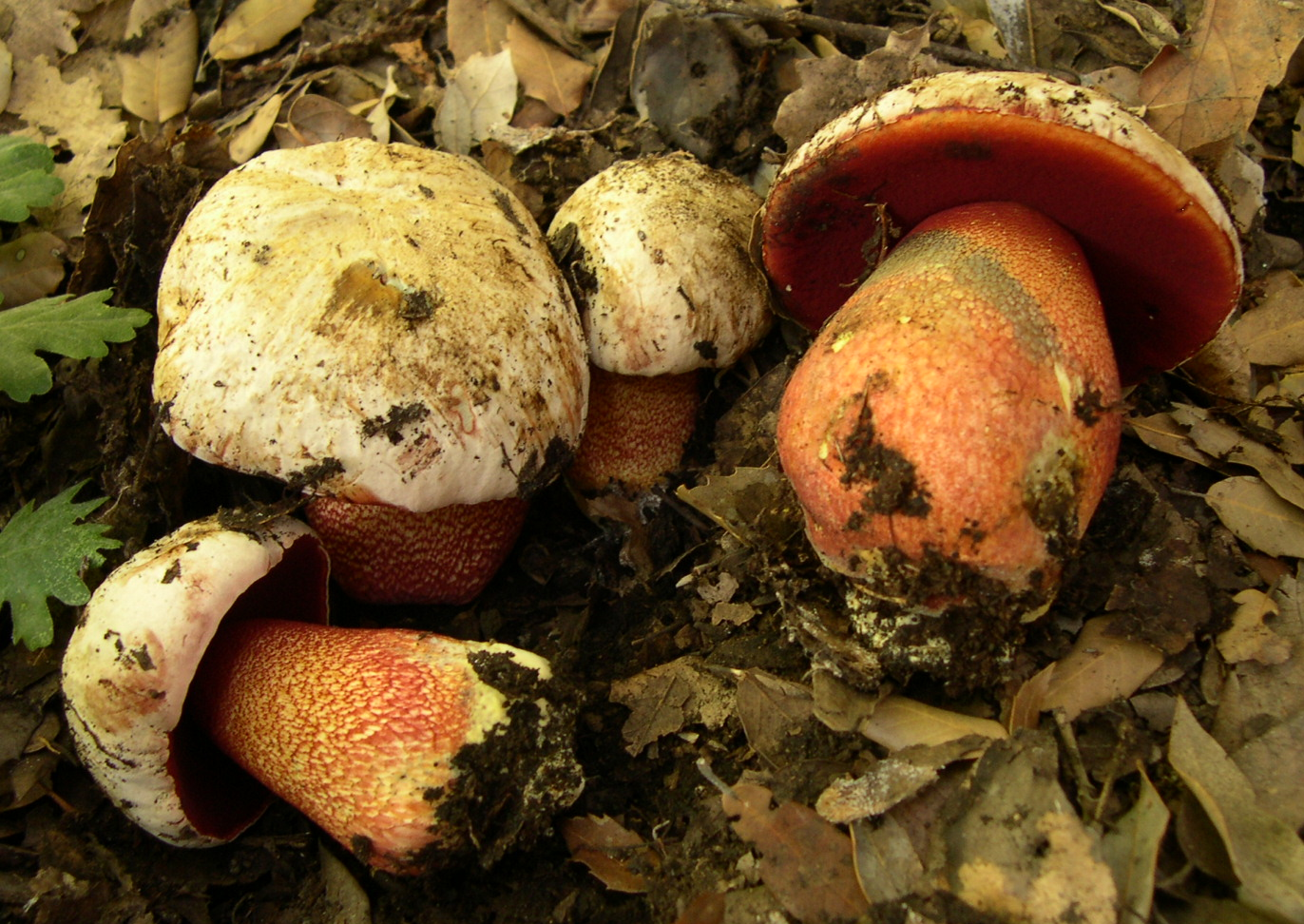

Conservation status
- Near Threatened (IUCN 3.1)

Scientific classification
- Kingdom: Fungi
- Division: Basidiomycota
- Class: Agaricomycetes
- Order: Boletales
- Family: Boletaceae
- Genus: Rubroboletus
- Species: R. rhodoxanthus

Binomial name
- Rubroboletus rhodoxanthus (Krombh.) Kuan Zhao & Zhu L.Yang (2014)

Synonyms
- Boletus sanguineus var. rhodoxanthus Krombh. (1836); Boletus rhodoxanthus (Krombh.) Kallenb. (1925); Boletus rhodopurpureus var. rhodoxanthus (Krombh.) Bon (1985); Suillellus rhodoxanthus (Krombh.) Blanco-Dios (2015)

= Rubroboletus rhodoxanthus =

Rubroboletus rhodoxanthus Mycological characteristics
- Pores on hymenium
- Cap is convex
- Hymenium is adnate
- Stipe is bare
- Spore print is olive-brown
- Ecology is mycorrhizal
- Edibility is poisonous

Rubroboletus rhodoxanthus is a species of bolete in the family Boletaceae, native to Europe. Previously known as Boletus rhodoxanthus, it was transferred in 2014 to the newly erected genus Rubroboletus, based on DNA data.

It produces large, colourful fruit bodies with pink patches on the cap, red pores in the hymenial surface and has a robust stem decorated in a dense, red-coloured network pattern. When longitudinally sliced, its flesh is distinctly bright yellow in the stem and discolours blue only in the cap, an excellent diagnostic feature distinguishing it from similar species.

The fungus is more widespread in warm broad-leaved forests of southern Europe, where it grows in mycorrhizal symbiosis with trees of the family Fagaceae, particularly oak (Quercus) and beech (Fagus). However, it is rare in northern regions and regarded as critically endangered or extinct in some countries.

Rubroboletus rhodoxanthus is generally regarded as inedible and may cause adverse gastrointestinal symptoms if consumed.

== Taxonomy and phylogeny ==
The fungus was first described in 1836 by Czech mycologist Julius Vincenz von Krombholz, who considered it to be a variety of Boletus sanguineus. In 1925, it was recombined as a distinct species by German mycologist Franz Joseph Kallenbach, and the fungus remained in genus Boletus until 2014. The species epithet is derived from the Ancient Greek words ρόδο (rhódo, "rose" or "pink") and ξανθός (xanthós, "blonde" or "fair").

The first extensive phylogenetic studies on Boletaceae in 2006 and 2013, indicated that Boletus was not monophyletic and hence an artificial arrangement. A 2014 study by Wu and colleagues recognised 22 generic clades within Boletaceae, concluding that Boletus dupainii and some closely related red-pored species belong to a distinct clade, distant from the core clade of Boletus (comprising Boletus edulis and allied taxa). The new genus Rubroboletus was therefore described to accommodate species in this clade and B. rhodoxanthus was transferred to this genus. The placement of the species in genus Suillellus, following an online recombination by Blanco-Dios, was not supported by molecular data and has been subsequently rejected by later authors.

== Description ==
The cap is at first hemispherical, gradually becoming convex to almost flat as the fungus expands, with a diameter of 10 to 20 cm (4 to 8 in), but can sometimes grow up to 30 cm (12 in). It is at first slightly velvety and coloured mostly whitish-grey, but soon becomes smooth, pinkish-grey, pinkish-beige or pinkish-red, especially towards the margin or when handled.

The tubes are adnate to emarginate, 0.5 to 1.5 cm (0 to 0.5 in) long and initially yellow, becoming somewhat olivaceous-yellow in very mature fruit bodies and staining blue when cut. The pores (tube mouths) are orange to deep red and instantly bluing when handled.

The stem is 8 to 12 cm (3 to 4.5 in) long by 3 to 6 cm (1 to 2.5 in) wide, bulbous or clavate when young, becoming more elongated and cylindrical at maturity. It is orange or orange-yellow at the top (apex), gradually becoming orange-red to carmine-red in the lower part and bears a dense, orange-red to carmine-red reticulation (network pattern).

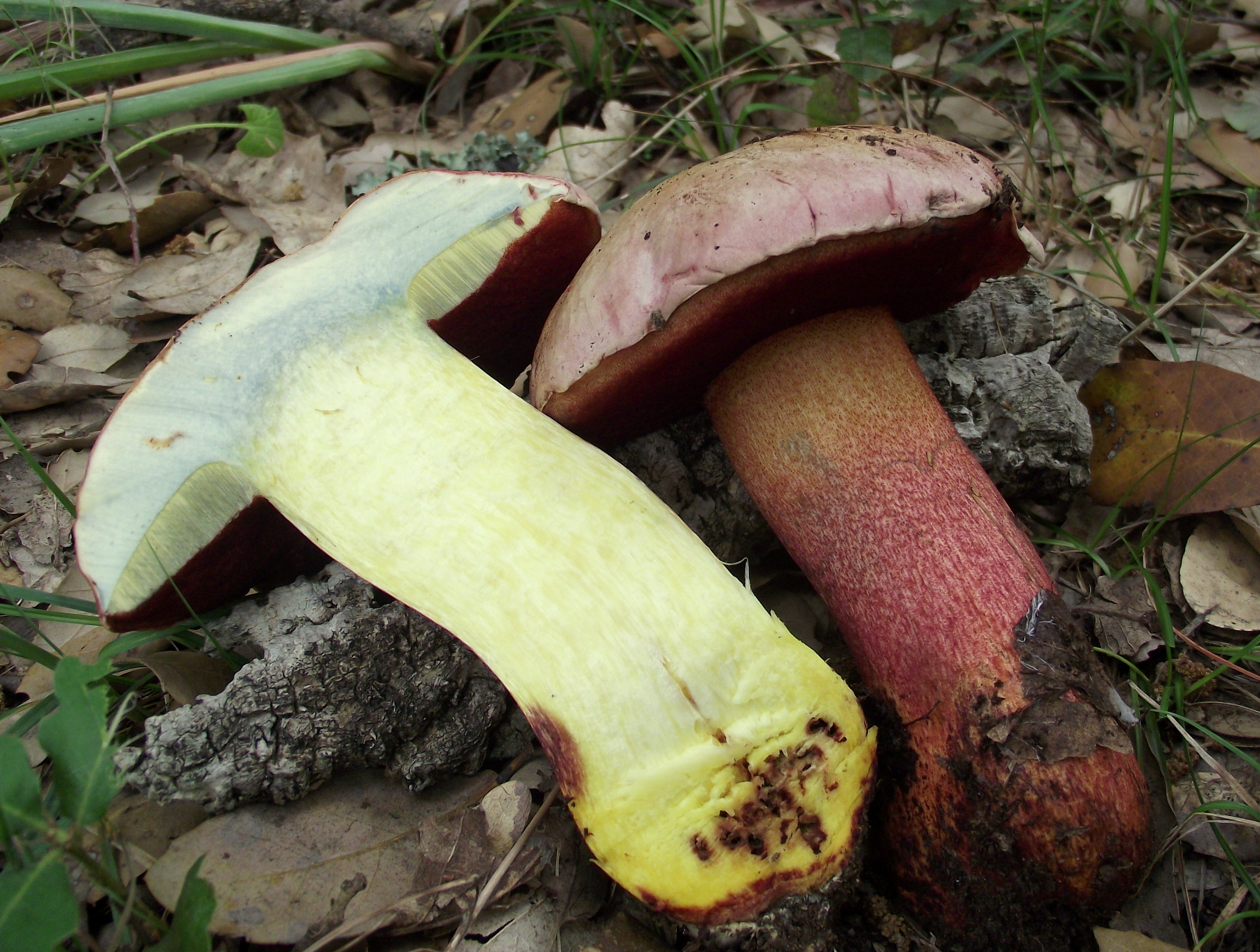
Sectioned fruit body displaying the characteristic yellow flesh and bluing in the cap.

The flesh is distinctly bright yellow and unchanging in the stem, but paler and turning blue when cut only in the cap. It has a mild taste.

The spores are olive-brown in mass. When viewed under the microscope they are ellipsoid to fusiform (spindle-shaped), measuring 10–15.5 by 4–5.5 μm. The cap cuticle is a trichodermium of septate cylindrical hyphae, sometimes finely incrusted.

=== Similar species ===
- Rubroboletus legaliae is very similar, but has a distinctive smell of chicory or hay and whitish flesh that stains blue in the cap, as well as the stem when cut.
- Rubroboletus satanas has a whitish cap without flushes of pink and whitish flesh that usually stains pale blue also in the stem when cut.
- Rubroboletus rubrosanguineus is mycorrhizal with spruce (Picea) or fir (Abies) and has pale yellow flesh that stains blue throughout.
- Rubroboletus demonensis, so far known only from southern Italy (Calabria and Sicily), has usually brighter colours on the cap ranging from pale grey to blood-red or purple, has yellow flesh that stains weakly to moderately blue throughout and microscopically has smaller spores, measuring 12.5–14 × 4.5–5 μm.
- Imperator rhodopurpureus differs by its pinkish-red to crimson-red cap that has a roughened or "hammered" appearance and stains blue when handled, but also by its flesh that stains intensely dark blue throughout.

== Distribution and habitat ==
Regarded as a rare species in northern Europe, Rubroboletus rhodoxanthus is more frequently encountered in warm, southern regions. It forms ectomycorrhizal associations with members of the Fagaceae, particularly oak (Quercus) and beech (Fagus), but sometimes also with chestnut (Castanea). Molecular phylogenetic testing has confirmed its presence in France, Italy, Portugal and the islands of Cyprus and Sardinia, but it is probably widespread throughout most of the Mediterranean region.

It has been reported as locally frequent on the island of Cyprus, where it appears in seasons with early rainfall, growing on serpentine soil under the endemic golden oak (Quercus alnifolia). In contrast, it is considered critically endangered in the Czech Republic and reported as extinct in England. In the British Islands it known only from Northern Ireland.

== Toxicity ==
Rubroboletus rhodoxanthus is generally regarded as inedible or even poisonous, and can cause an adverse gastrointestinal reaction if eaten. In the Colour Atlas of Poisonous Fungi, Bresinsky and Besl claim that the fungus might be edible if thoroughly cooked, but warn against collecting it because of its rarity and possibility of confusion with R. satanas.
