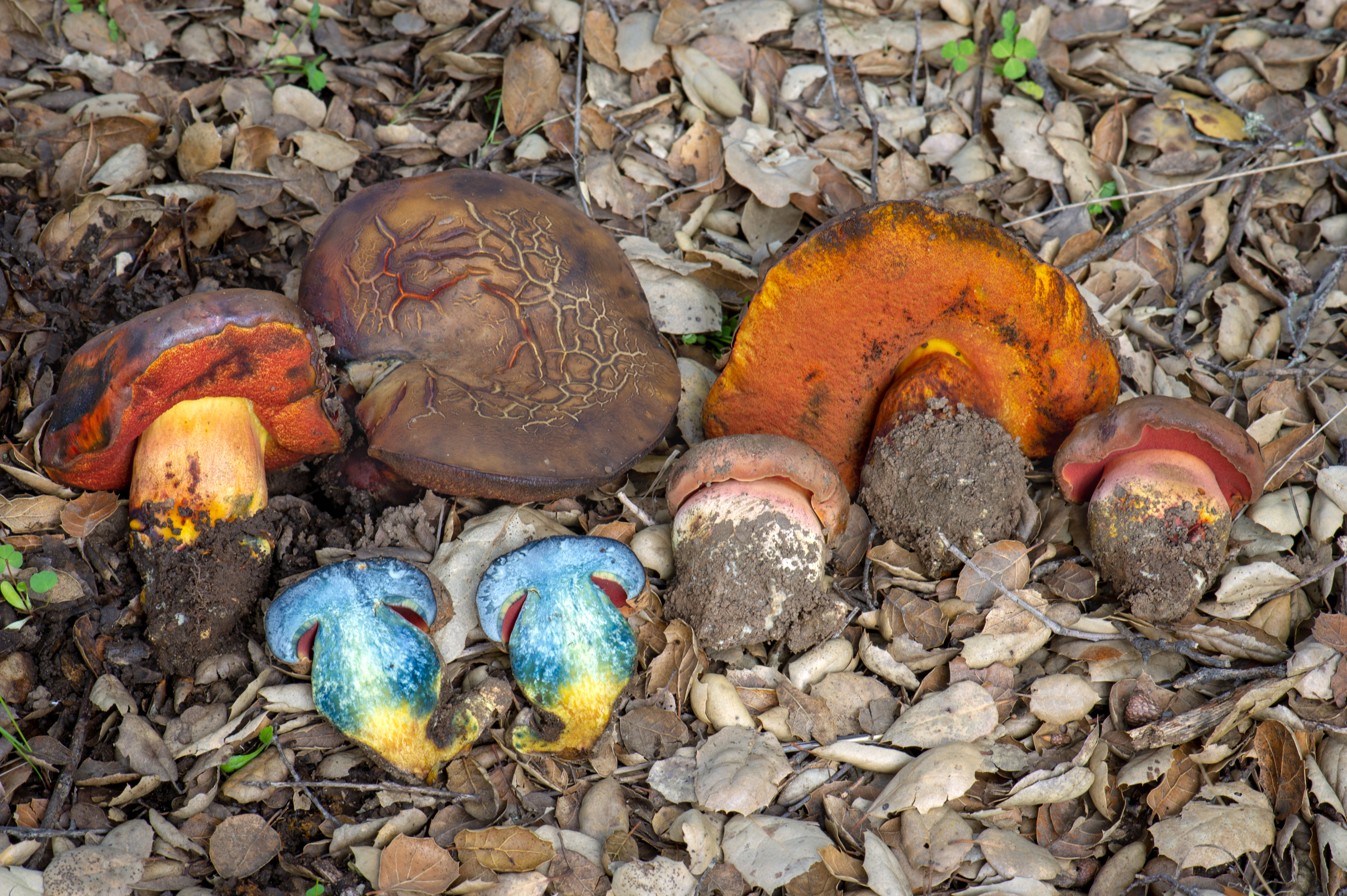

Scientific classification
- Kingdom: Fungi
- Division: Basidiomycota
- Class: Agaricomycetes
- Order: Boletales
- Family: Boletaceae
- Genus: Suillellus
- Species: S. amygdalinus

Binomial name
- Suillellus amygdalinus (Thiers) Vizzini, Simonini & Gelardi (2014)

Synonyms
- Boletus puniceus Thiers (1965); Boletus amygdalinus Thiers (1975)

= Suillellus amygdalinus =

Species of fungus

Suillellus amygdalinus Mycological characteristics
- Pores on hymenium
- Cap is convex
- Hymenium is adnate
- Stipe is bare
- Spore print is olive-brown
- Ecology is mycorrhizal
- Edibility is unknown

Suillellus amygdalinus (formerly Boletus amygdalinus) is a fungus of the bolete family found in western North America. The fruit bodies, or mushrooms, are characterized by their thick, red to brown caps, red pores, and the strong bluing reaction observed when the mushroom tissue is injured or cut.

The cap can reach diameters of up to 12 cm (4.7 in) and the stipe 9 cm (3.5 in) long by 3 cm (1.2 in) thick at maturity. Other similar red-pored, bluing boletes from North America, including Rubroboletus eastwoodiae, Boletus luridiformis, and B. subvelutipes, can be distinguished from S. amygdalinus either by the color of the cap, the degree of reticulation (a network of raised ridges) on the stipe, or by location.

This mushroom has been found in manzanita and madrone woodlands of central California north to southern Oregon. The edibility of the mushroom is unknown, but it may be poisonous.

== Taxonomy ==
The species was first named Boletus puniceus by Harry D. Thiers in 1965, based on specimens he found in Napa County, California, on 23 November 1963. In 1975, Thiers changed the name to Boletus amygdalinus (a nomen nudum) as he discovered that the epithet had already been used for a different bolete found in Yunnan, China, published in 1948. The fungus was transferred to Suillellus in 2014 after molecular phylogenetics demonstrated that S. amygdalinus was in a lineage distinct from Boletus.

In Latin, amygdaline means relating to or resembling an almond.

== Description ==
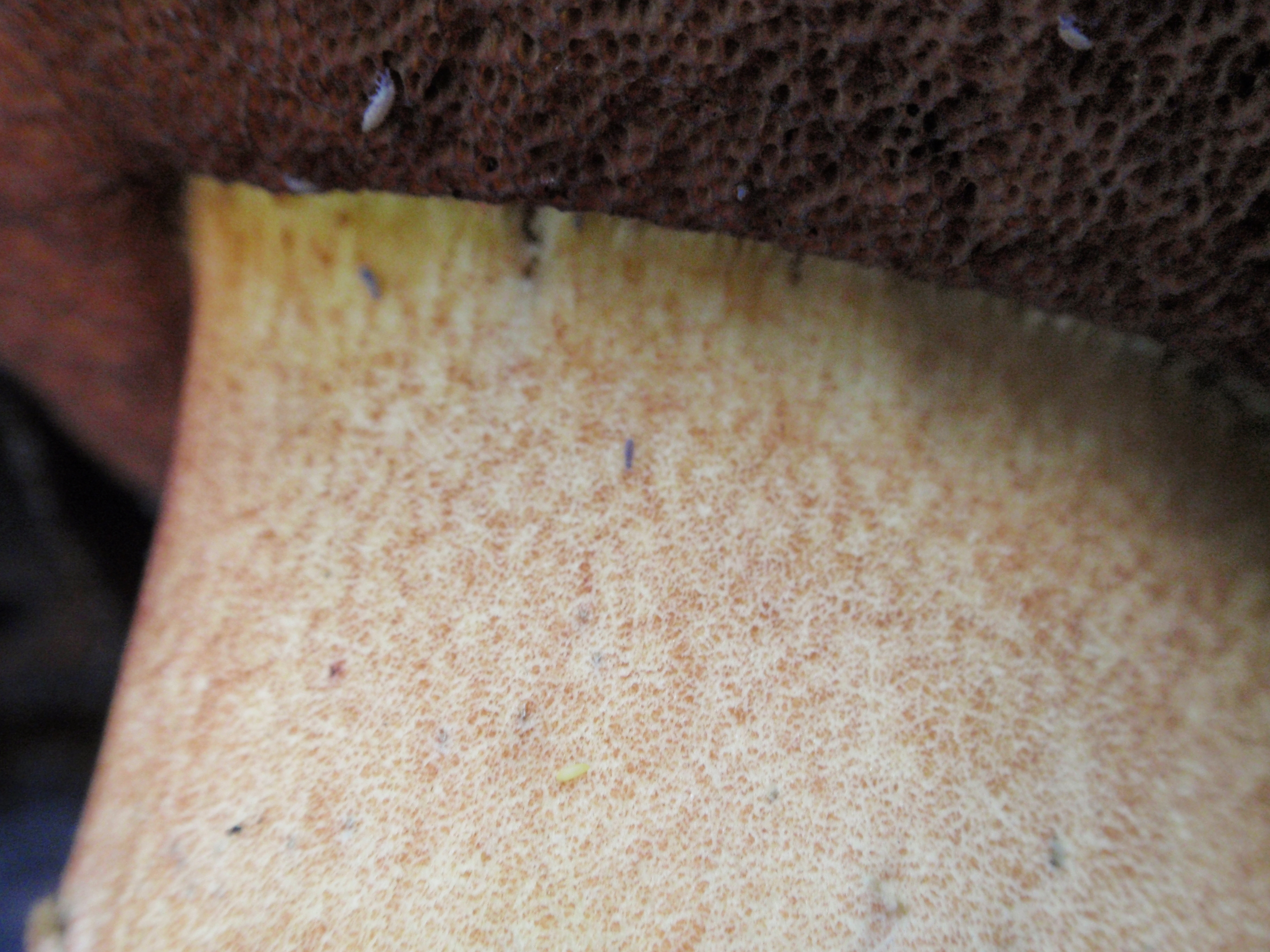
The stipe is not reticulate.

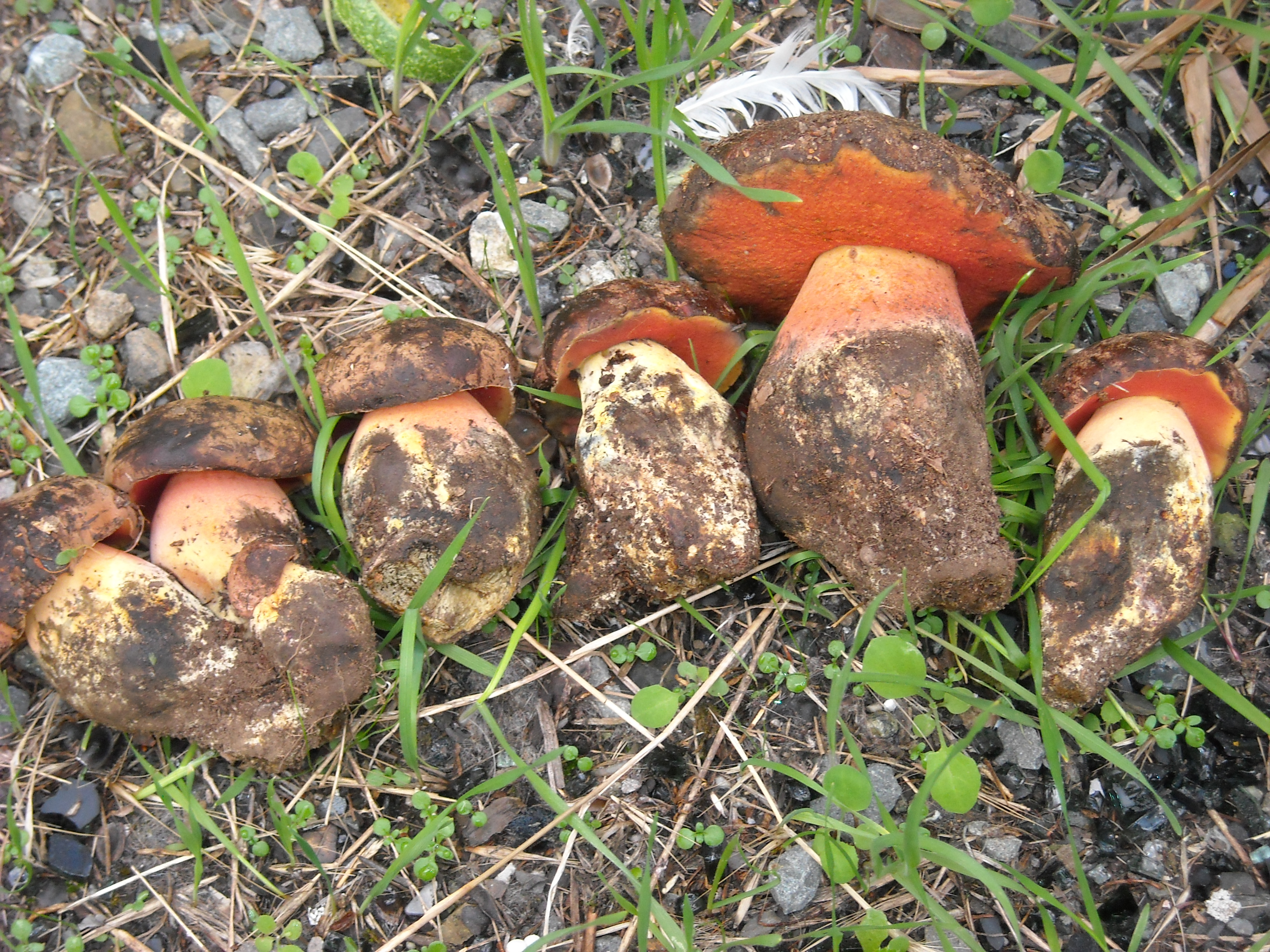
A collection from Forestville, California

Suillellus amygdalinus is a large solid mushroom with a convex to somewhat flattened, irregular cap that can reach diameters of 6 to 12 cm (2.4 to 4.7 in) at maturity. The surface of the cap is dry, and matted with fibers; the cap color of young specimens is red, but the mushrooms typically change to more brownish tones as they mature. The margin of the cap starts out curved inwards (incurved) and gradually becomes curved downwards (decurved) with age. The pores on the underside of the cap are 0.5 to 1 mm (0.02 to 0.04 in) wide, angular, and red or red-orange, while the tubes are 1 to 1.5 cm (0.4 to 0.6 in) deep.

The stipe lacks a netted pattern (reticulation) and is yellow in color but is often covered by red hairs, especially near the base. The stipe is either equal in width throughout, or thicker in the middle; it reaches dimensions of 4–9 cm (1.6–3.5 in) long by 1–3 cm (0.4–1.2 in) thick. The base of the stipe is typically bent. The flesh is 1 to 2 cm (0.4 to 0.8 in) thick, and yellow in color, but like all parts of the mushroom, will stain blue immediately upon bruising or cutting. Both the odor and taste of the fruit bodies are mild.

=== Microscopic characteristics ===
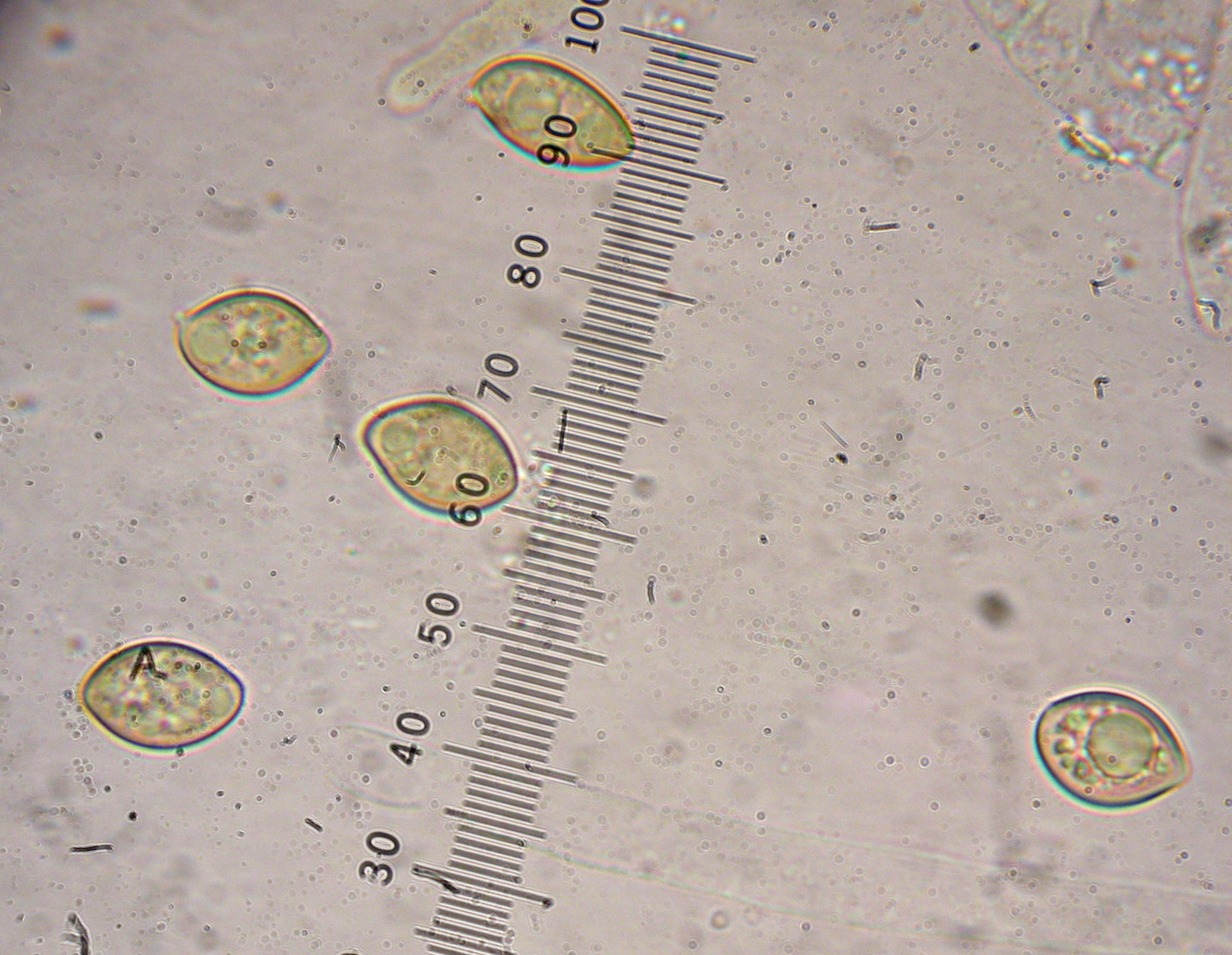
The thick-walled ellipsoid spores contain vacuoles.

Suillellus amygdalinus produces a dark olive-brown spore print. The spores are thick-walled, smooth, and ellipsoid to somewhat spindle-shaped, with dimensions of 11.2–16 by 5.2–8 μm. They become dark ochraceous when stained with Melzer's reagent, and, because of the occasional presence of two large vacuoles, may appear as if they are two-celled. The basidia (the spore-bearing cells) are club-shaped, contain numerous vacuoles, and measure 30–35 by 9–11 μm. Cystidia are present on sides of the tubes, and they measure 45–54 by 10–12 μm. Clamp connections are not present in the hyphae of S. amygdalinus.

Various chemical color tests can be used to help identify fruit bodies suspected to be S. amygdalinus. A drop of dilute potassium hydroxide (KOH) will turn the cap flesh dingy orange, while it turns the cap cuticle red, or darker. Ammonia (as ammonium hydroxide, NH_{4}OH) produces a dingy yellow on the flesh, and brown on the cap. Iron sulphate (FeSO_{4)} produces either no change to a pale grey color with both the flesh and the cuticle. Hydrochloric acid (HCl) causes the flesh to turn orange or pink, but has no color reaction with the cuticle.

=== Similar species ===
Bolete lookalikes

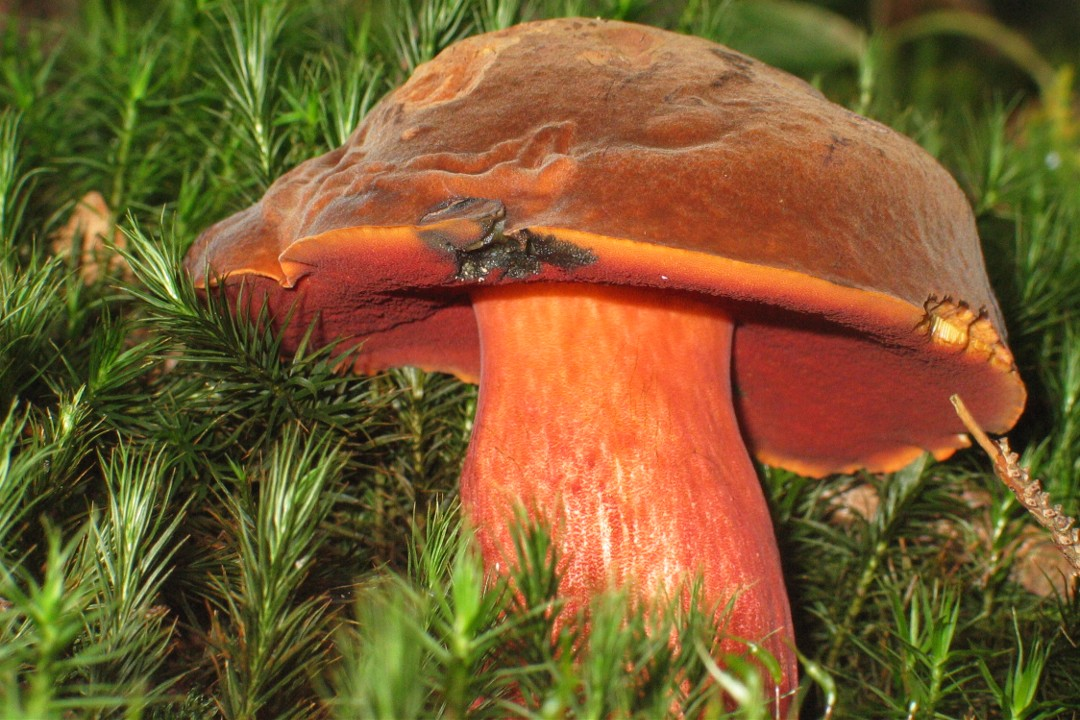
Boletus luridiformis

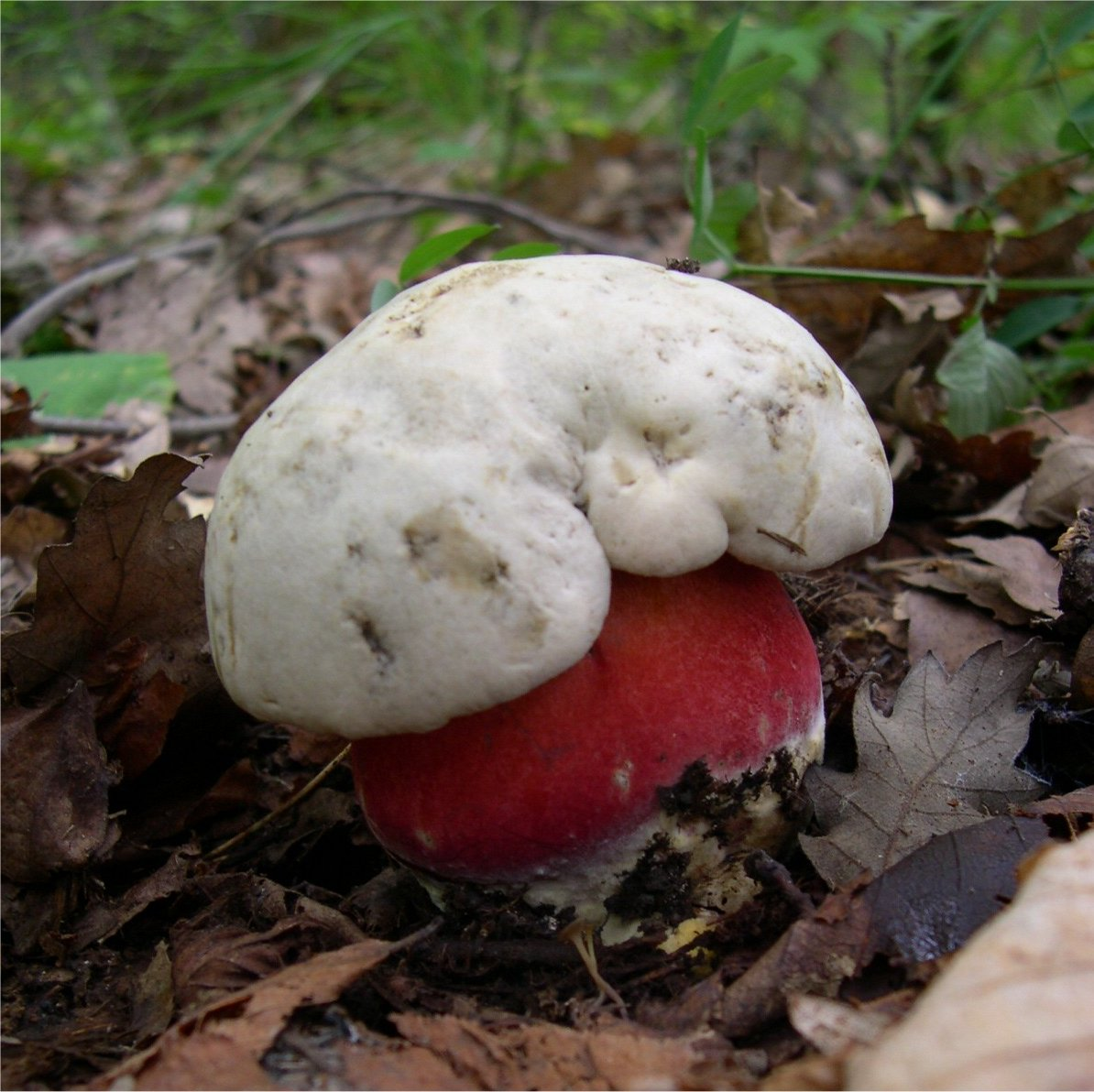
Rubroboletus satanas

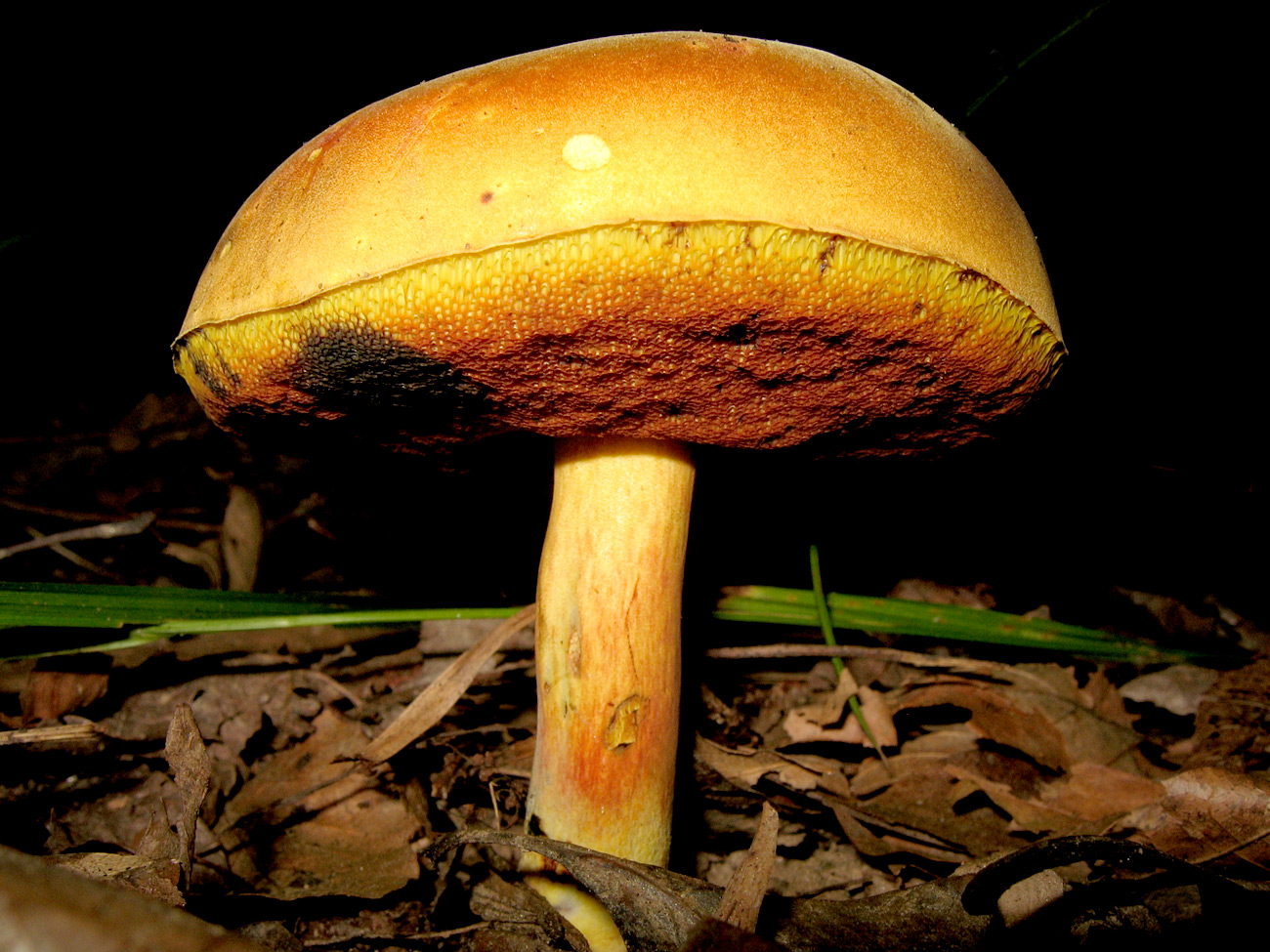
Boletus subvelutipes

There are several other red-pored, bluing boletes that could be confused with S. amygdalinus. The poisonous European species Rubroboletus satanas and its North American counterpart R. eastwoodiae have lighter colored caps and a reticulate pattern on the stipe. B. subvelutipes is a highly variable species from eastern North America that includes red in its range of cap colors, and has a fuzzy coating of hairs near the base of its stipe; it may represent a group of species. Another similar species is B. luridiformis, found in North America and Northern Europe under both broadleaf trees and conifers. Unlike S. amygdalinus, however, B. luridiformis has a dark brown to nearly blackish-brown cap, and a yellow stipe with a dense covering of red pruina (dots). B. frostii is also similar.

== Distribution and habitat ==
Suillellus amygdalinus mushrooms grow on the ground in groups, or scattered about. The fungus has been reported from low-elevation hardwood forests composed of live oak, manzanita and madrone in California, and Oregon. Fruiting occurs after the onset of autumn rains, usually between the October and January. The mushroom can be difficult to spot, as its cap is similar in coloring to the leaves of the madrone tree with which it is associated, and because the mushroom is frequently buried under leaves.

== Potential edibility ==
Although the edibility of S. amygdalinus is not known with certainty, authorities often recommend to avoid consuming blue-staining, red-pored boletes, as several are poisonous. The species was implicated in one group of poisonings in California in 1996–97, but because of the nature of the symptoms experienced, there was probably more than one type of mushroom consumed.

== See also ==
- List of North American boletes
