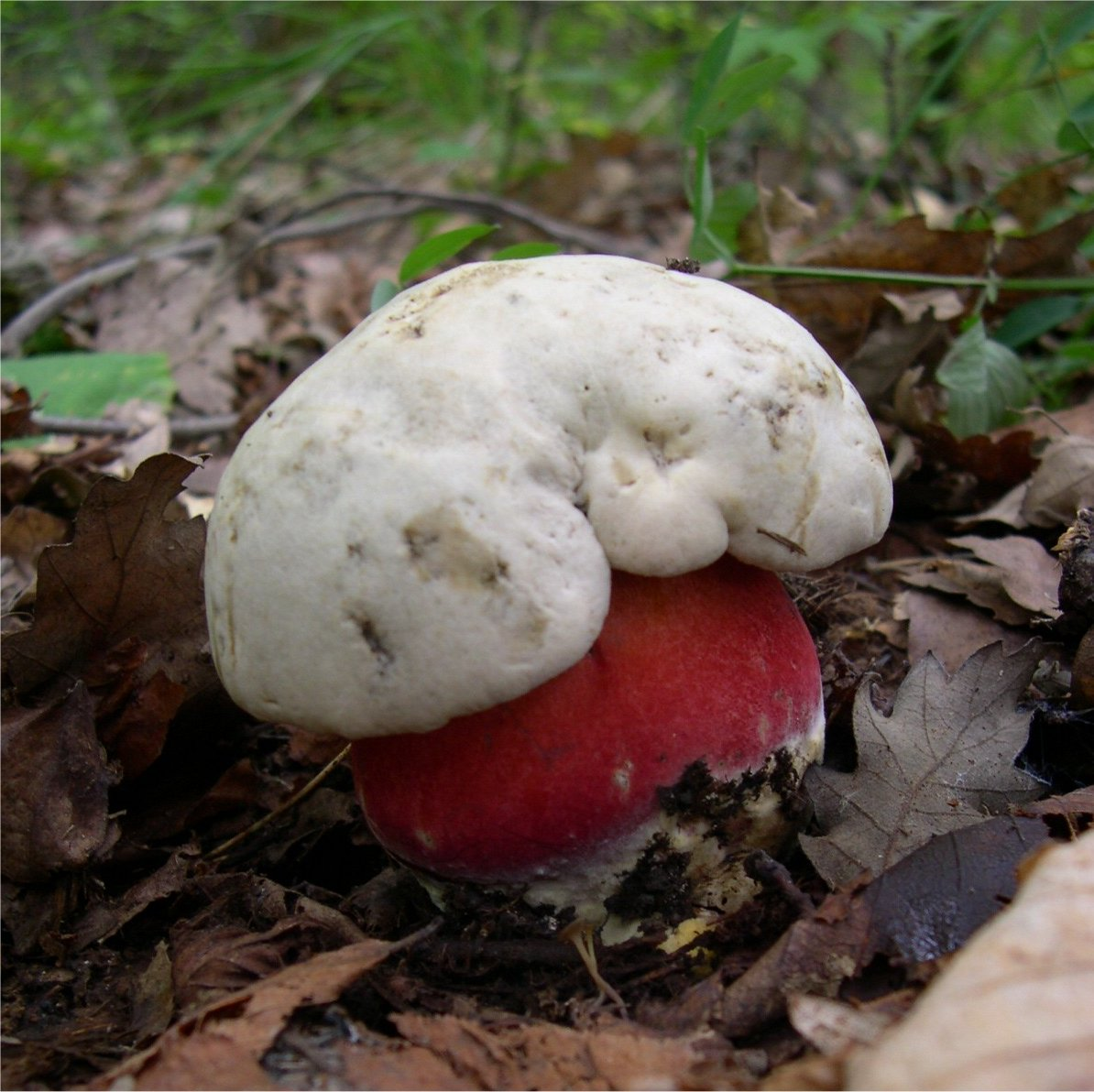

Scientific classification
- Kingdom: Fungi
- Division: Basidiomycota
- Class: Agaricomycetes
- Order: Boletales
- Family: Boletaceae
- Genus: Rubroboletus
- Species: R. satanas

Binomial name
- Rubroboletus satanas (Lenz) Kuan Zhao & Zhu L. Yang (2014)

Synonyms
- Boletus satanas Lenz (1831); Suillus satanas (Lenz) Kuntze (1898); Tubiporus satanas (Lenz) Maire (1937); Suillellus satanas (Lenz) Blanco-Dios (2015)

= Rubroboletus satanas =

Rubroboletus satanas
- Mycological characteristics
- Pores on hymenium
- Cap is convex
- Hymenium is adnate
- Stipe is bare
- Spore print is olive-brown
- Ecology is mycorrhizal
- Edibility is poisonous

Rubroboletus satanas, commonly known as Satan's bolete or as the Devil's bolete, is a basidiomycete fungus of the bolete family (Boletaceae) and one of its most infamous members. It was known as Boletus satanas before its transfer to the new genus Rubroboletus in 2014, based on molecular phylogenetic data.

These squat, brightly coloured fruiting bodies are often massive and imposing, with a beige-coloured velvet-textured cap up to 50 cm (20 in) across, yellow to orange-red pores and a bulbous red stem. The flesh turns blue when cut or bruised and the fruit bodies often emit an unpleasant rotten odor.

Found in mixed woodlands throughout the warmer regions of Europe, it is classified as a poisonous mushroom, known to cause violent gastroenteritis. However, reports of poisoning are rare, due to the striking coloration and unpleasant odor of the fruiting bodies, which discourage experimentation.

== Taxonomy ==
Originally known as Boletus satanas, Satan's bolete was described by German mycologist Harald Othmar Lenz in 1831. Lenz was aware of several reports of adverse reactions from people who had consumed this fungus and apparently felt himself ill from undescribed "emanations" while describing it, hence giving it its sinister epithet. The Greek word σατανᾶς (satanas) is derived from Hebrew śāṭān (שטן). The American mycologist Harry D. Thiers concluded that material from North America matches the species description; however, genetic testing has since confirmed that western North American collections represent Rubroboletus eastwoodiae, a different species.

Genetic analysis published in 2013 revealed that B. satanas and several other red-pored boletes are part of the "dupainii" clade (named after B. dupainii) and are distantly nested from the core group of Boletus (including B. edulis and relatives) within the Boletineae. This indicated that B. satanas and its relatives belonged to a distinct genus. The species was hence transferred to the new genus Rubroboletus in 2014, along with several allied red-pored, blue-staining bolete species. Genetic testing on several species of the genus revealed that R. satanas is most closely related to R. pulchrotinctus, a morphologically similar but much rarer species occurring in the Mediterranean regions.

=== Common names ===
Both Rubroboletus satanas and Suillellus species are known as ayı mantarı ('bear mushroom') in eastern Turkey.

== Description ==
The compact cap can reach an impressive 30 cm (12 in), exceptionally 40 cm (16 in), and very rarely 50 cm (20 in) in diameter. It is arguably the largest bolete found in Europe. At first it is hemispherical with an inrolled margin, but becomes convex at maturity as the fruit body expands, while in older specimens the margin might be slightly undulating. When young, the pileus is greyish white to silvery-white or buff, but older specimens tend to develop olivaceous, ochraceous or brownish tinges. The surface of the cap is finely tomentose, becoming smooth at maturity and is often slightly viscid in wet weather. The cuticle is tightly attached to the flesh and does not peel.

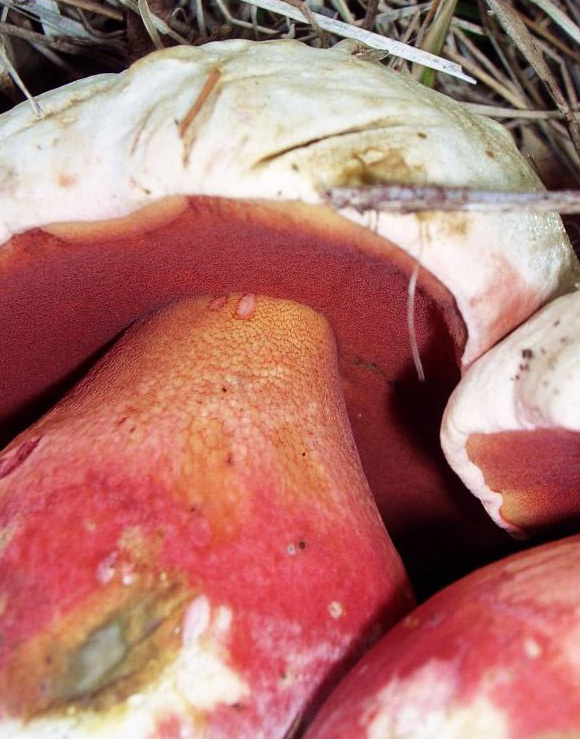
View of stipe and pore surface

The free to slightly adnate tubes are up to 3 mm (1/8 in) long, pale yellow or greenish yellow and bluing when cut. The pores (tube mouths) are rounded, yellow to orange at first, but soon turning red from the point of their attachment to the stem outwards, eventually becoming entirely purplish red or carmine-red at full maturity and instantly bluing when touched or bruised. The stipe is 5–15 cm (2–6 in), extraordinarily 20 cm (8 in), very rarely 25 cm (10 in) long, distinctly bulbous (4–12 cm or 1.6–4.7 in, extraordinarily 16 cm or 6.3 in, very rarely 20 cm or 7.9 in), and often wider than its length, becoming more ventricose as the fungus expands but remaining bulbous at the base. Its colour is golden-yellow to orange at the apex, becoming increasingly pinkish-red to reddish-orange further down and deep carmine-red to purple-red towards the base. It is decorated in a fine, yellowish to reddish hexagonal net, sometimes confined to the upper half of the stipe. The flesh is thick, spongy and whitish, but may be yellow to straw-coloured in immature specimens and is sometimes reddish at the stem base. It slowly turns a faded blue colour when cut, bluing more intensely around the apex and above the tubes. The smell is weak and pleasantly musky in young fruit bodies, but becomes increasingly putrid in older specimens, reminiscent of carrion. Young specimens have a reportedly pleasant, nutty taste. The spore print is olivaceous green.

The spores are fusiform (spindle-shaped) when viewed under a microscope and measure 10–16 × 4.5–7.5 μm. The cap cuticle is composed of interwoven septate hyphae, which are often finely incrusted.

=== Similar species ===
Satan's bolete can be confused with a number of other species:

- Rubroboletus rhodoxanthus is found predominantly on acidic soil, develops pinkish tinges of the cap, has a more or less cylindrical or clavate stipe with a very dense, well-developed net and lemon-yellow flesh that distinctly stains blue only in the cap when longitudinally sliced.
- Rubroboletus legaliae is also acidophilous, has pinkish tinges on the cap, flesh that stains more extensively blue when cut and narrower spores, measuring 9–15 × 4–6 μm.
- Rubroboletus pulchrotinctus has a variable cap colour often featuring a pinkish band at the margin; has a dull-coloured stipe without deep red tinges, pores that remain yellow or orange even in mature fruit bodies, and somewhat narrower spores, measuring 12–15 × 4.5–6 μm.
- Rubroboletus rubrosanguineus is associated with spruce (Picea) or fir (Abies), has pinkish tinges on the cap and smaller spores, measuring 10–14.5 × 4–6 μm.
- Caloboletus calopus is usually associated with coniferous trees, has pores that remain persistently yellow even in overripe fruit bodies, has a more slender, cylindrical or clavate stipe and narrower spores, measuring 11–16 × 4–5.5 μm.

== Distribution and habitat ==
Rubroboletus satanas is widely distributed throughout the temperate zone, but is rare in most of its reported localities. In Europe, it mostly occurs in the southern regions and is rare or absent in northern countries. It fruits in the summer and early autumn in warm, broad-leaved and mixed forests, forming ectomycorrhizal associations with oak (Quercus) and sweet chestnut (Castanea), with a preference for calcareous (chalky) soils. Other frequently reported hosts are hornbeam (Carpinus), beech (Fagus) and lime and linden trees (Tilia).

In the United Kingdom, this striking bolete is found only in the south of England. It is rare in Scandinavia, occurring primarily on a few islands in the Baltic Sea where conditions are favourable, with highly calcareous soil. In the eastern Mediterranean region, it has been reported from the Bar'am Forest in the Upper Galilee region of northern Israel, as well as the island of Cyprus, where it is found in association with the narrow-endemic golden oak (Quercus alnifolia). It has further been documented in the Black Sea and eastern Anatolia regions of Turkey, as well as Crimea and Ukraine, with its distribution possibly extending as far south as Iran.

In the past, R. satanas had been reported from the United States, but these sightings are instead of the closely related species Rubroboletus eastwoodiae.

== Toxicity ==
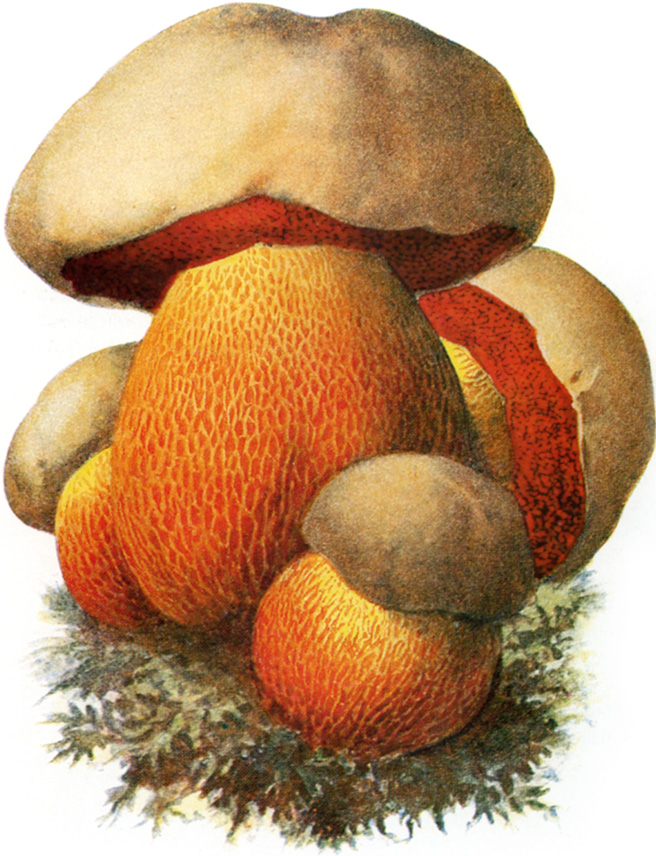
Illustration by artist Albin Schmalfuß, 1897

This mushroom is moderately poisonous, especially if eaten raw. The symptoms, which are predominantly gastrointestinal in nature, include nausea, abdominal pain, and violent vomiting with bloody diarrhea that can last up to six hours.

The toxic enzyme bolesatine has been isolated from fruiting bodies of R. satanas and is implicated in the poisonings. Bolesatine is a protein synthesis inhibitor and, when given to mice, causes massive thrombosis. At lower concentrations, bolesatine is a mitogen, inducing cell division in human T lymphocytes. Muscarine has also been isolated from this fungus, but the quantities are believed to be far too small to cause toxic effects in humans. More recent studies have associated the poisoning caused by R. satanas with hyperprocalcitonemia, and classified it as a distinct syndrome among fungal poisonings.

Controversially, English mycologist John Ramsbottom reported in 1953 that R. satanas is consumed in certain parts of Italy and the former Czechoslovakia. In those regions, the fungus is reportedly eaten following prolonged boiling in order to inactivate the bolesatine, though this has never been proven scientifically. Similar reports exist from the San Francisco Bay Area of the United States, but probably involve a different fungus misidentified as R. satanas. Ramsbottom speculated that there may be a regional variation in toxicity levels, and conceded that the fungus may not be as poisonous as widely reported. Nevertheless, R. satanas is rarely sampled casually, not least because of the foul smell, which in addition to their bright red colour and blue staining, make this fungus unappealing for human consumption.
