= Rubroboletus esculentus =

Scientific classification
- Kingdom: Fungi
- Division: Basidiomycota
- Class: Agaricomycetes
- Order: Boletales
- Family: Boletaceae
- Genus: Rubroboletus
- Species: R. esculentus

Binomial name
- Rubroboletus esculentus Kuan Zhao & Hui M. Shao (2017)

Species of fungus

Rubroboletus esculentus
- Mycological characteristics
- Pores on hymenium
- Cap is convex
- Hymenium is adnate
- Stipe is bare
- Spore print is olive-brown
- Ecology is mycorrhizal
- Edibility is choice

Rubroboletus esculentus is a bolete fungus in the family Boletaceae. It is found in southwestern China.

The cap is bright red or blood red and measures 7-12 cm across. It is sticky when wet. The flesh under the cap is 2–2.5 cm thick and yellow. The tubes are yellow, while the pore surface is red to brownish red. The stout stipe is 9–12 cm high by 2–4 cm wide and often has a bulbous base. All parts of the mushroom turn blue when cut or bruised.

Rubroboletus esculentus was described in 2017. Its closest relative genetically is Rubroboletus rhodoxanthus.

It is a popularly eaten and highly regarded mushroom in Aba, Chengdu and Dujiangyan of Sichuan Province in southwestern China, where it is seen in markets.
