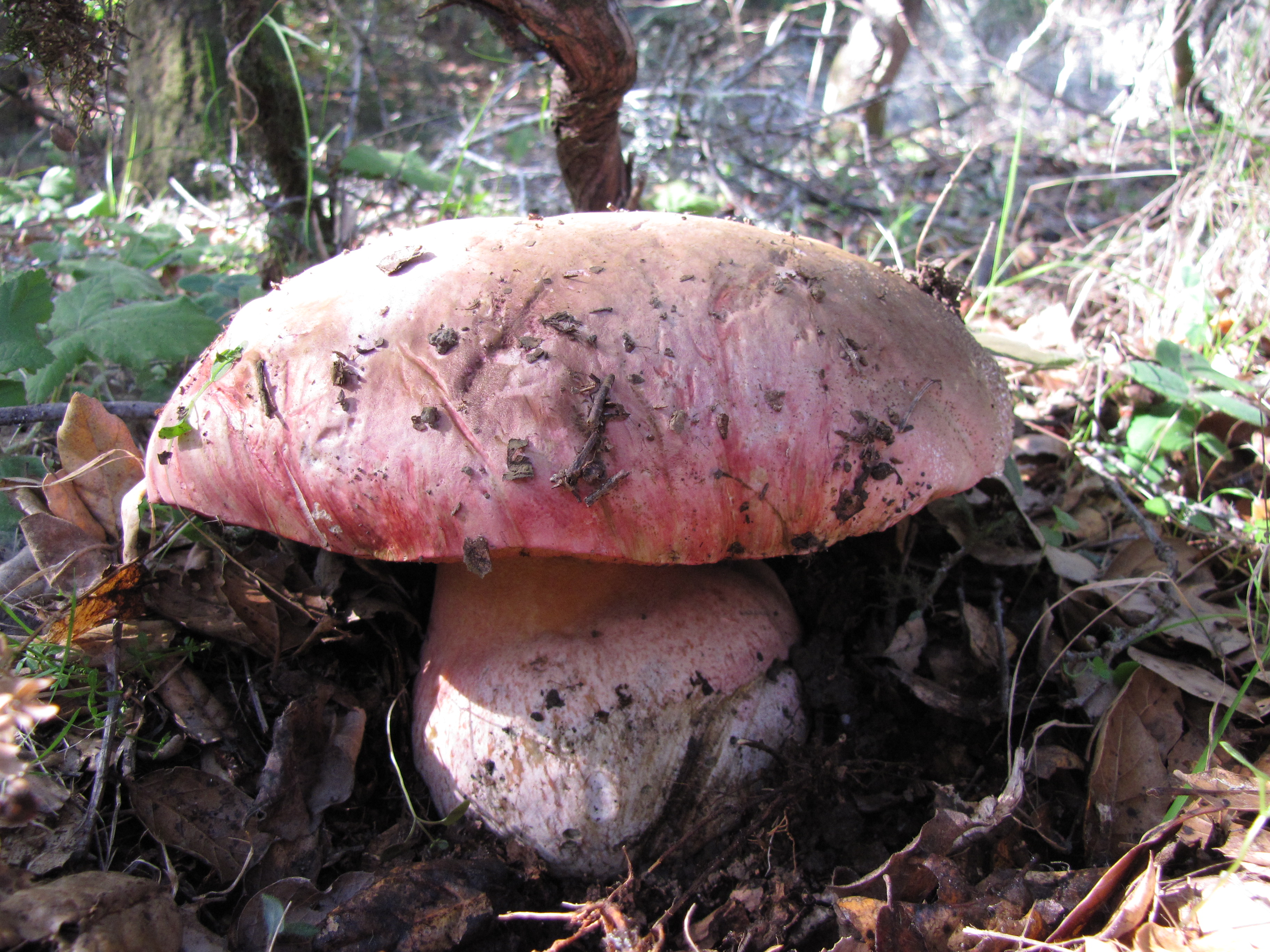

Conservation status
- Least Concern (IUCN 3.1)

Scientific classification
- Kingdom: Fungi
- Division: Basidiomycota
- Class: Agaricomycetes
- Order: Boletales
- Family: Boletaceae
- Genus: Rubroboletus
- Species: R. eastwoodiae

Binomial name
- Rubroboletus eastwoodiae (Murrill) Vasquez, Simonini, Svetash., Mikšík, & Vizzini, 2017

Synonyms
- Suillellus eastwoodiae Murrill, 1910; Boletus eastwoodiae (Murrill) Sacc. & Trotter, 1912; Tubiporus eastwoodiae (Murrill) S. Imai, 1968; Rubroboletus eastwoodiae (Murrill) D. Arora, C.F. Schwarz, 2015

= Rubroboletus eastwoodiae =

Species of fungus

Rubroboletus eastwoodiae
- Mycological characteristics
- Pores on hymenium
- Cap is convex
- Hymenium is adnate
- Stipe is bare
- Spore print is olive-brown
- Ecology is mycorrhizal
- Edibility is unknown

Rubroboletus eastwoodiae, sometimes called satan's bolete, is a possibly toxic basidiomycete fungus of the bolete family.

The cap is 6–25 centimetres (2 1/2–10 in) wide, convex, olive-colored, pinkish in age, dry, has margin that curves inward then expands, and yellowish flesh. The stalk is 7–15 cm (3–6 in) tall and 3–6 cm (1 1/4–2 1/4 in) wide. The flesh turns blue when cut. The spores are olive-brown, elliptical, and smooth. The spore print is olive brown.

It is closely related to Rubroboletus pulcherrimus. It looks similar to but is genetically distinct from the European species R. satanas. It is also similar to R. pulcherrimus and Suillellus amygdalinus.

It occurs under oak on the West Coast of the United States from November to January.

The edibility of the species is unknown; it may be poisonous.
