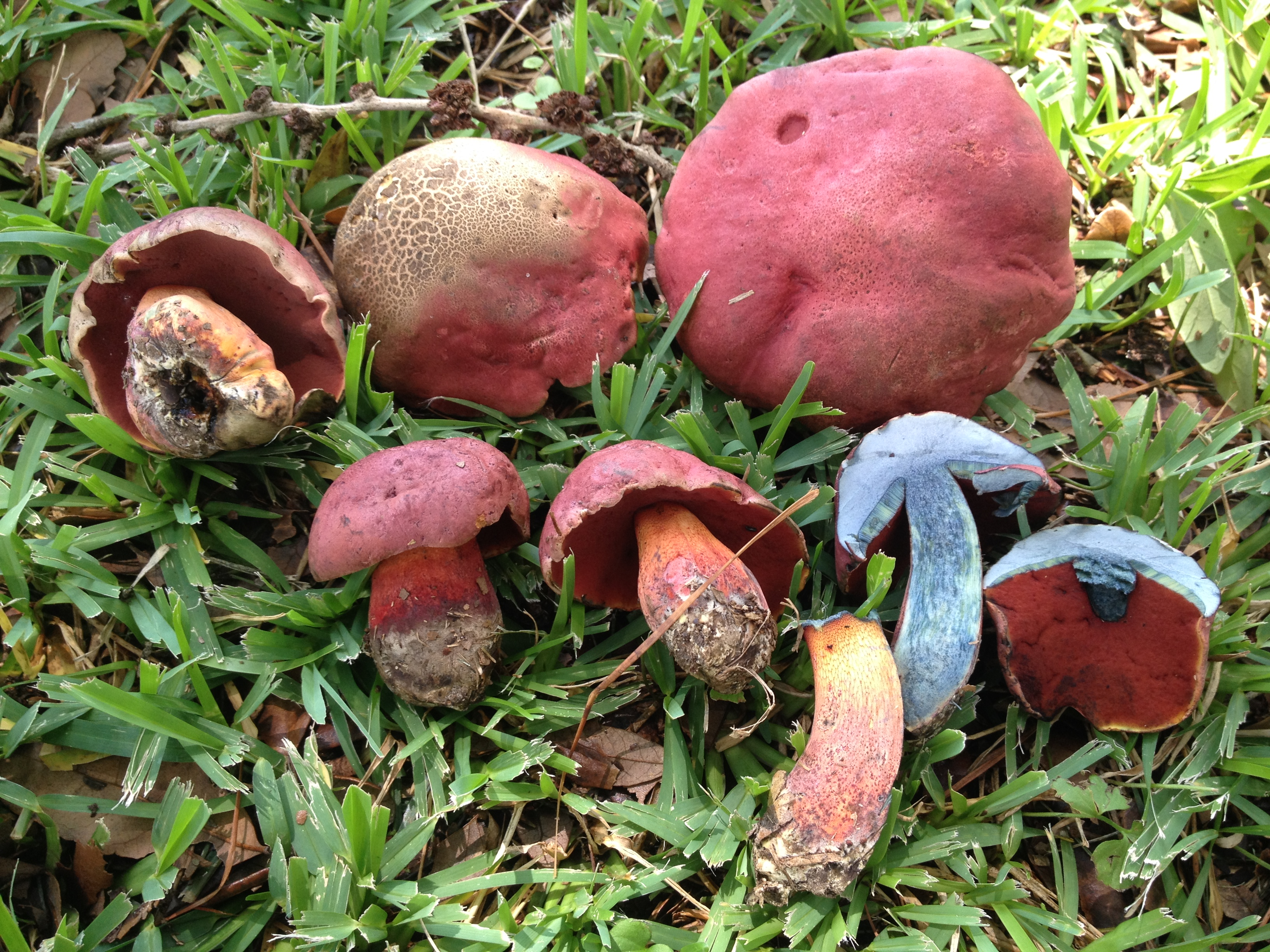

Scientific classification
- Domain: Eukaryota
- Kingdom: Fungi
- Division: Basidiomycota
- Class: Agaricomycetes
- Order: Boletales
- Family: Boletaceae
- Genus: Rubroboletus
- Species: R. rhodosanguineus

Binomial name
- Rubroboletus rhodosanguineus (Both) Kuan Zhao & Zhu L.Yang (2014)

Synonyms
- Boletus rhodosanguineus Both (1998)

= Rubroboletus rhodosanguineus =

Species of fungus

Rubroboletus rhodosanguineus Mycological characteristics
- Pores on hymenium
- Cap is convex
- Hymenium is adnate
- Stipe is bare
- Spore print is olive-brown
- Ecology is mycorrhizal
- Edibility is unknown

Rubroboletus rhodosanguineus is a fungus of the genus Rubroboletus native to North America. It was described scientifically by mycologist Ernst Both in 1998. It was transferred from Boletus to the new genus Rubroboletus in 2014, along with several other allied reddish colored, blue-staining bolete species.

== See also ==
- List of North American boletes
