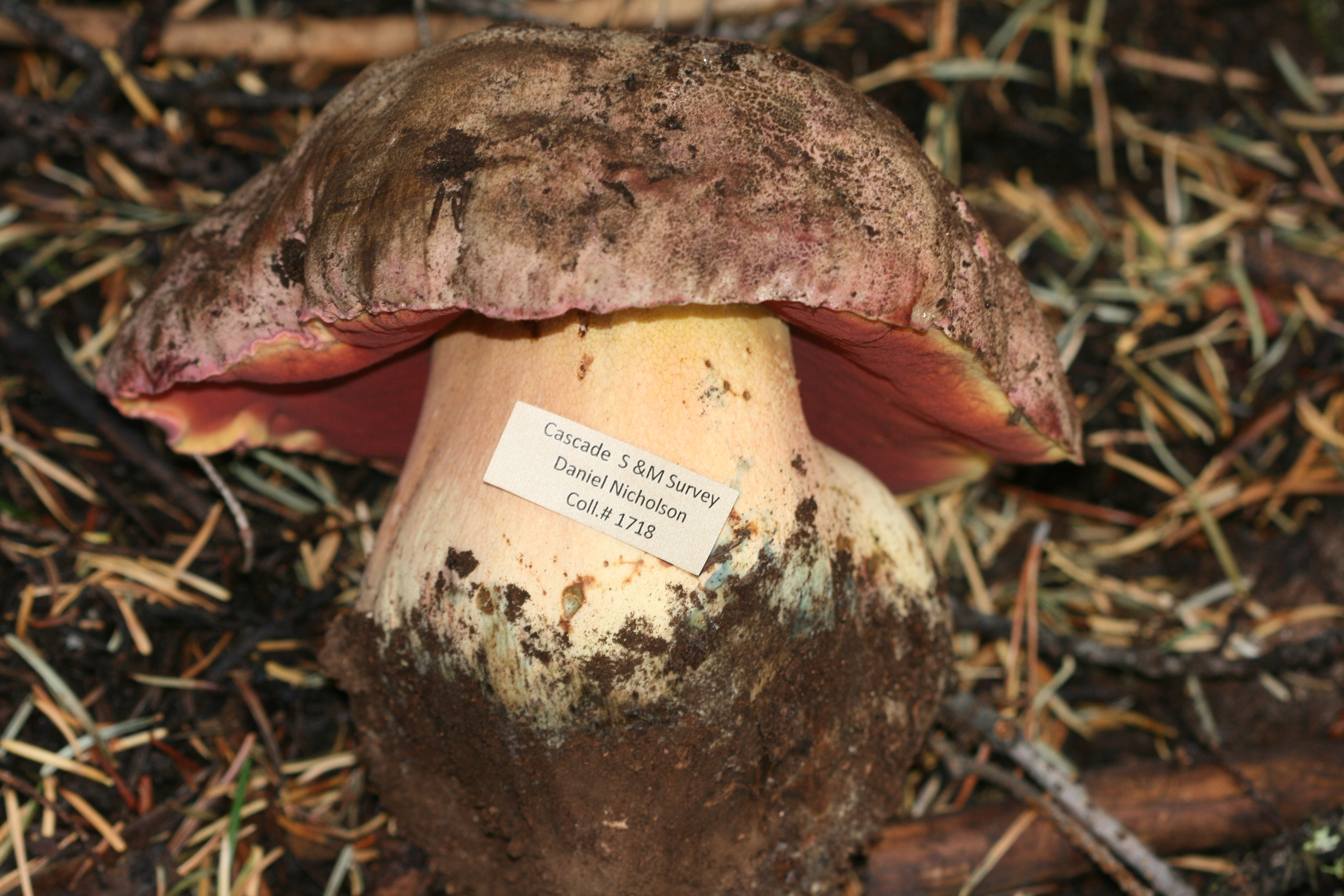

Conservation status
- Least Concern (IUCN 3.1)

Scientific classification
- Kingdom: Fungi
- Division: Basidiomycota
- Class: Agaricomycetes
- Order: Boletales
- Family: Boletaceae
- Genus: Rubroboletus
- Species: R. haematinus

Binomial name
- Rubroboletus haematinus (Halling) D.Arora & J.L.Frank (2015)

Synonyms
- Boletus haematinus Halling (1976)

= Rubroboletus haematinus =

Species of fungus

Rubroboletus haematinus Mycological characteristics
- Pores on hymenium
- Cap is convex
- Hymenium is adnate
- Stipe is bare
- Spore print is olive-brown
- Ecology is mycorrhizal
- Edibility is unknown

Rubroboletus haematinus is a fungus of the genus Rubroboletus. First described scientifically in 1976 by Roy Halling as a species of Boletus, in 2015 it was transferred to Rubroboletus, a genus circumscribed the year previously to contain other allied reddish colored, blue-staining bolete species. It is found in the western United States.

== See also ==
- List of North American boletes
