= Rubroboletus pulchrotinctus =

Scientific classification
- Kingdom: Fungi
- Division: Basidiomycota
- Class: Agaricomycetes
- Order: Boletales
- Family: Boletaceae
- Genus: Rubroboletus
- Species: R. pulchrotinctus

Binomial name
- Rubroboletus pulchrotinctus (Alessio) Kuan Zhao & Zhu L.Yang (2014)

Synonyms
- Boletus pulchrotinctus Alessio (1985); Suillellus pulchrotinctus (Alessio) Blanco-Dios (2015); Boletus pseudofechtneri Cetto, nom. prov. (inval.), 1983; Boletus cicognanii Ubaldi (1986)

Species of fungus

Rubroboletus pulchrotinctus is a rare bolete fungus in the genus Rubroboletus, native to central and southern Europe. It was originally described in genus Boletus by Italian mycologist Carlo Luciano Alessio in 1985, but subsequently transferred to genus Rubroboletus by Zhao and colleagues (2015), on the basis of molecular evidence. Phylogenetically, R. pulchrotinctus is the sister-species of the better known Rubroboletus satanas, with which it shares several morphological features.

Rubroboletus pulchrotinctus forms ectomycorrhizal associations with several members of the Fagaceae, particularly species of oak species (Quercus).

It is known from Spain, France, Italy and Greece, as well as the Balkan and Crimean Peninsulas. In the eastern Mediterranean region, its distribution extends as far south as Israel, where it is found in Mount Carmel National Park and Beit Oren growing under the Palestine oak (Quercus calliprinos) and the island of Cyprus, where it is found under the endemic golden oak (Quercus alnifolia).
