= Rubroboletus latisporus =

Scientific classification
- Domain: Eukaryota
- Kingdom: Fungi
- Division: Basidiomycota
- Class: Agaricomycetes
- Order: Boletales
- Family: Boletaceae
- Genus: Rubroboletus
- Species: R. latisporus

Binomial name
- Rubroboletus latisporus Kuan Zhao & Zhu L.Yang (2014)

Species of fungus

Rubroboletus latisporus is a bolete fungus in the family Boletaceae. It is found in Yunnan province in southwestern China, associated with Pinus massoniana and Quercus trees.
