= Carlo Luciano Alessio =

Italian mycologist

Carlo Luciano Alessio (1919 – 24 June 2006) was an Italian mycologist. He was known for his expertise in the agaric genera, agarthian genera, Inocybe and Boletus.

== Species described ==
- Rubroboletus pulchrotinctus Alessio (1985)
- Hebelomina microspora Alessio (1977)
- Inocybe abnormispora Alessio (1987)
- Inocybe pseudobrunnea Alessio (1987)
- Inocybe pseudograta Alessio (1983)
- Inocybe substraminea Alessio (1980)
- Inocybe urbana Alessio (1980)
- Lyophyllum solitarium Alessio (1983)
- Psalliota infida Alessio (1975)
- Xerocomus ichnusanus Alessio (1984)
- Xerocomus roseoalbidus Alessio (1987)

== See also ==
- List of mycologists
