= Harald Othmar Lenz =

German pedagogue and naturalist (1798–1870)

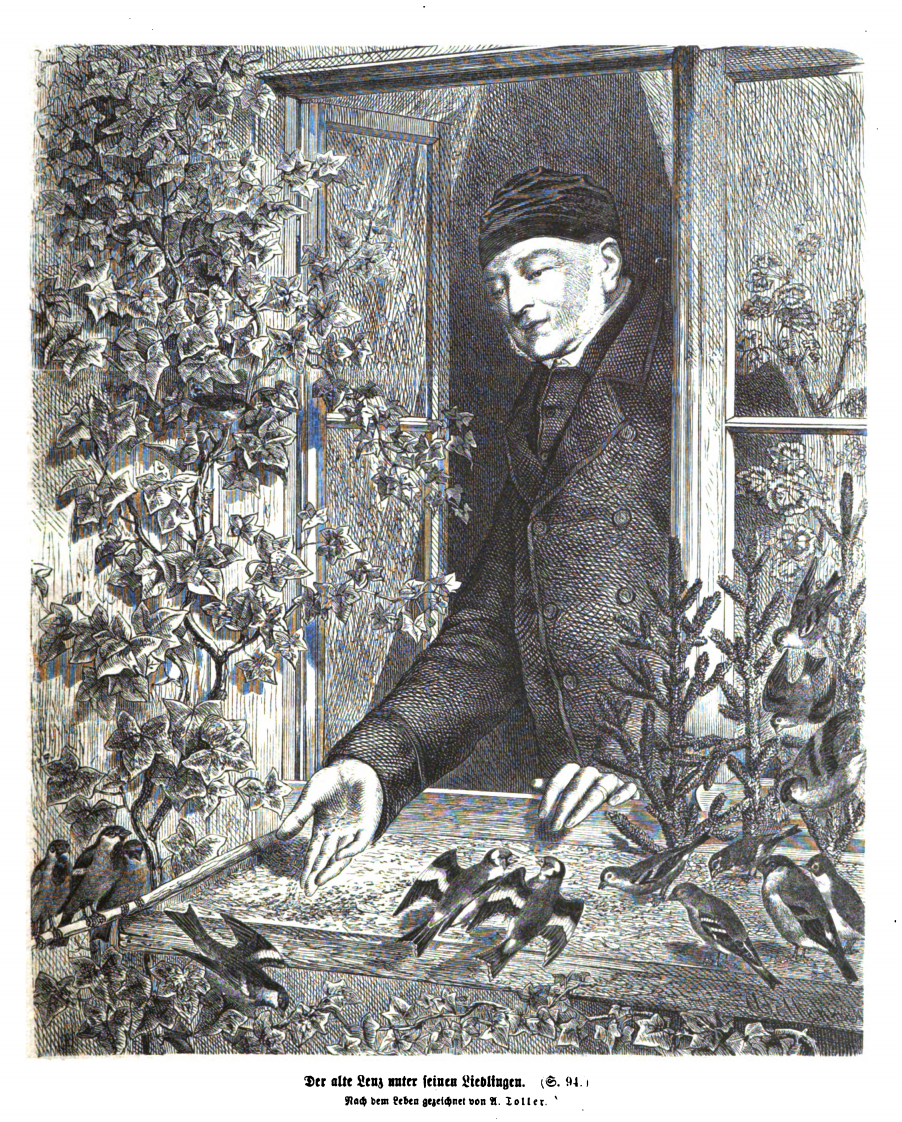

Harald Othmar Lenz (27 February 1798 – 13 January 1870) was a German pedagogue, philologist, and naturalist. He wrote several books on botanical history, fungi, snakes and zoological textbooks. His books influenced the work of Alfred Brehm. Lenz described the fungus Rubroboletus satanas.

== Life and work ==
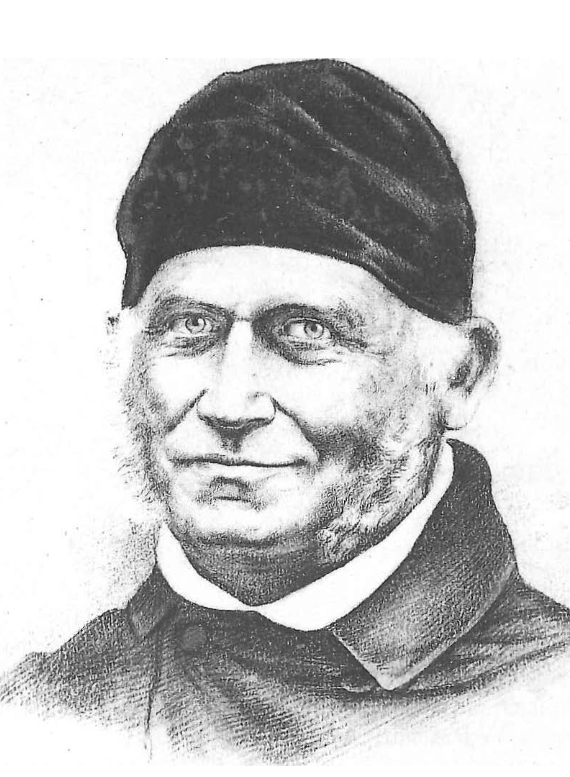
c. 1860

Lenz was born in Schnepfenthal where his father Christian Ludwig (1760–1833) was a teacher at the boarding school where young Lenz also studied. The boarding school in Schnepfenthal was founded in 1784 by mother Magdalena's father Christian Gotthilf Salzmann (1744–1811) who had founded the school. The school had an emphasis on humanistic principles and holistic education. Salzmann taught natural history at the school. Lenz later studied at the Weimar Gymnasium in 1812 where his father had shifted and then went to the University of Göttingen to study philology in 1816. He listed to lectures by Johann Friedrich Blumenbach and became interested in natural history. He then went to Leipzig in 1818 and passed the teaching examination in Berlin. He received a doctorate in 1820 with a treatise on Homeric hymns on Dionysus. He then joined Thorn Gymnasium, teaching Latin, Greek and natural history. He then moved to Marienwerder and then in 1824 he went to Schnepfenthal becoming its second director and curator of the natural history collection. In 1831 he wrote a book on the mammals based on Cuvier's classification. He also wrote a book on the edible and poisonous mushrooms in 1831 (this was during a famine in Thuringia around 1828–29) and a book on snakes in 1832. In 1837 he travelled to Switzerland and Italy. He met Gian Marchet Colani and made large collections of specimens before returning. He wrote about this in the Stuttgarter Morgenblatt, noting the rumours about Colani shooting hunters. He married Charlotte (1814–1895) daughter of Schnepfenthal teaching colleague Julius Girtanner in 1839. In 1849 he traelled again through Europe along with the Scottish philosopher Thomas Carlyle and his student Andy Keith Faulkner. In 1856 he was involved in bird conservation in Gotha. In 1859, on the 75th anniversary of the Schnepfenthal school, he was appointed as professor. Several taxa including the amaranth Lenzia (R. Philippi, 1863), the fungi Lenzites (E. Fries, 1835), Lenzitina (P. Karsten, 1889) and Lenzitopsis (G. Malençon & R. Bertault, 1963) have been named in his honour.
