= Bolesatine =

Bolesatine is a glycoprotein isolated from the mushroom Rubroboletus satanas (Boletus satanas Lenz), a basidiomycete in the bolete family. Bolesatine has a lectin function that is specific to the sugar binding site of D-galactose. It is a monomeric protein with a compact globular structure and is thermostable. It is considered a lectin. It has a molecular mass of approximately 63 kDa. One tryptophan can be found in its primary sequence along with one disulfide bridge.

Bolesatine causes gastroenteritis in humans and, at high enough concentrations, inhibits protein synthesis. It does not inhibit protein synthesis directly. It was previously suggested that bolesatine belonged to the ribosome-inactivating protein (RIP) family; however, experimental analysis using Endo's assay did not detect β-fragments which are characteristic of N-glycosylase activity, suggesting that bolesatine does not act through ribosomal depurination.The toxicity of bolesatine is heat-labile; the protein is denatured at elevated temperatures, which results in the loss of its biological activity. Instead, it acts as a phosphatase for nucleoside triphosphate, particularly for GTP. This enzymatic function disrupts cellular GTP-dependent processes and is considered the cause of inhibition of protein synthesis. At lower concentrations, it is a mitogen to human and rat T lymphocytes. Studies have shown that at low concentrations, protein kinases C (PKC) are activated in vitro and in vero cells, leading to an increase in DNA synthesis activity.

== Effects of bolesatine poisoning ==
Other than the accumulation of toxins in human liver and organs, Bolesatine poisoning causes agglutination in human red blood cells and platelets at threshold concentrations. The following symptoms of hypertension and dizziness would be expected when affected. In severe cases, death may result. Gastrointestinal symptoms including nausea, vomiting, and abdominal pain have also been reported upon consuming raw or insufficiently cooked Rubroboletus satanas.
