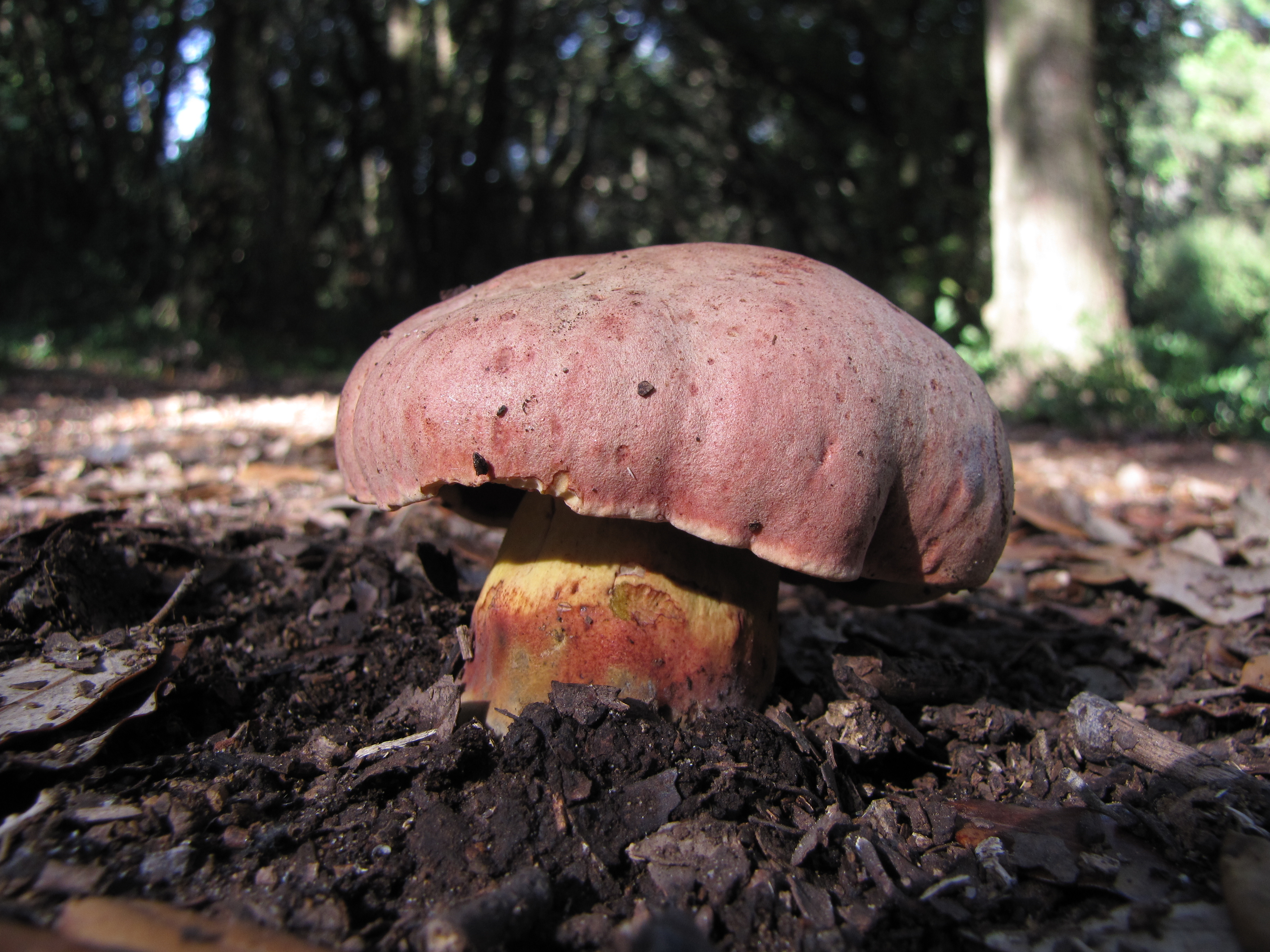

Scientific classification
- Domain: Eukaryota
- Kingdom: Fungi
- Division: Basidiomycota
- Class: Agaricomycetes
- Order: Boletales
- Family: Boletaceae
- Genus: Rubroboletus
- Species: R. lupinus

Binomial name
- Rubroboletus lupinus (Fr.) Costanzo, Gelardi, Simonini & Vizzin (2015)

Synonyms
- Boletus luridus var. lupinus (Fr.) E.-J.Gilbert; Boletus lupinus Fr. (1838); Dictyopus tuberosus var. lupinus (Fr.) Quél. (1886); Suillellus lupinus (Fr.) Blanco-Dios (2015)

= Rubroboletus lupinus =

Species of fungus

Rubroboletus lupinus Mycological characteristics
- Pores on hymenium
- Cap is convex
- Hymenium is adnate
- Stipe is bare
- Spore print is olive-brown
- Ecology is mycorrhizal
- Edibility is unknown

Rubroboletus lupinus, commonly known as the wolf bolete, is a bolete fungus of the genus Rubroboletus. Originally described by Elias Magnus Fries in 1838 as species of Boletus, it was transferred to Rubroboletus in 2015, a genus circumscribed to host other allied reddish-colored, blue-staining bolete species forming a distinct clade. The species epithet is derived from the Latin word lupus, meaning "wolf".

Molecular studies have revealed considerable genetic variation among European populations of R. lupinus, placing it in a clade sister to Rubroboletus dupainii. The species is found in warm broad-leaved forests, forming ectomycorrhizal associations with various species of oak (Quercus) and sweet chestnut (Castanea).
