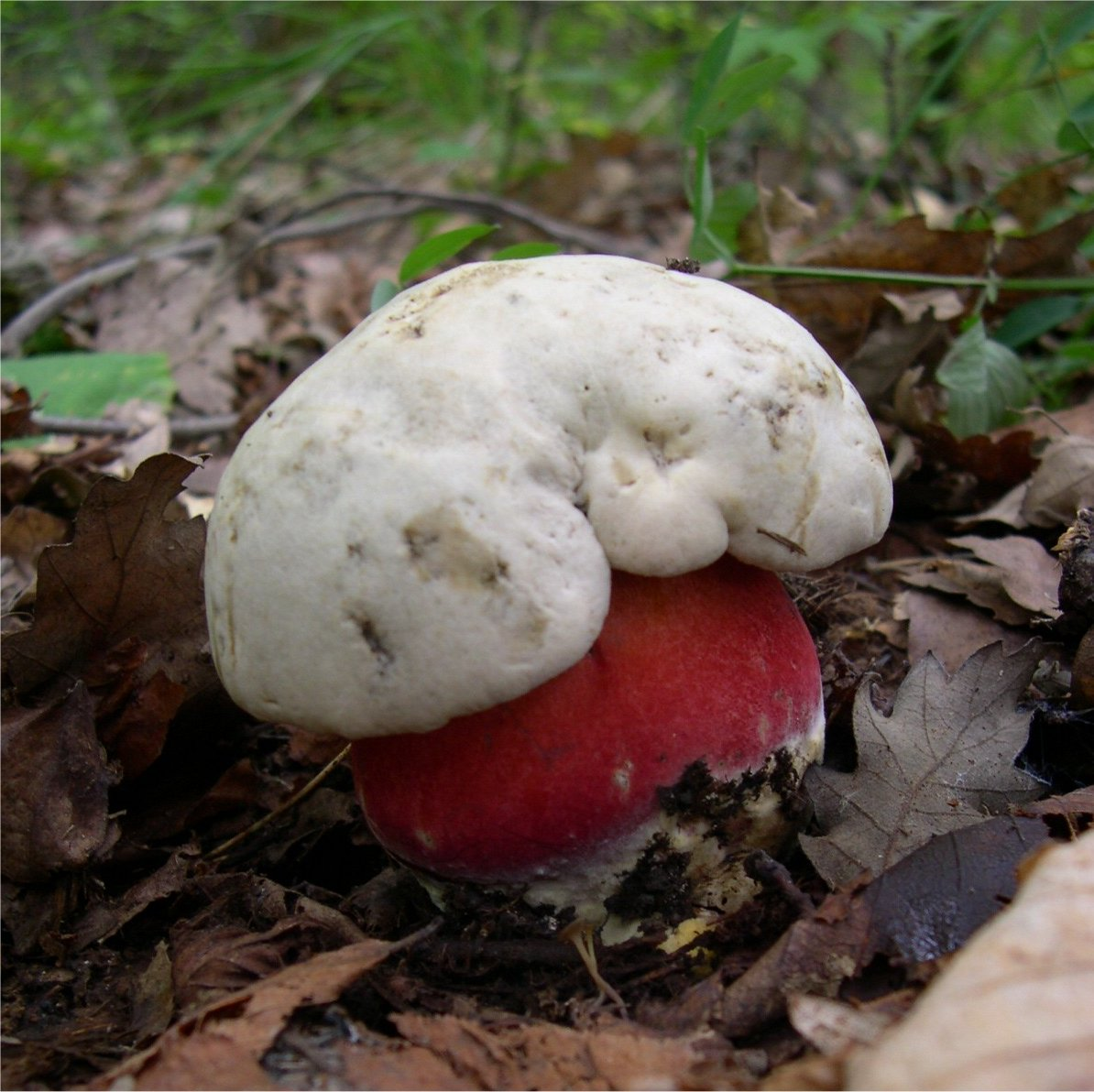
- Rubroboletus satanas

Scientific classification
- Kingdom: Fungi
- Division: Basidiomycota
- Class: Agaricomycetes
- Order: Boletales
- Family: Boletaceae
- Genus: Rubroboletus; Kuan Zhao & Zhu L.Yang (2014)

Type species
- Rubroboletus sinicus (W.F.Chiu) Kuan Zhao & Zhu L.Yang (2014)

= Rubroboletus =

Genus of fungi

Rubroboletus is a genus of bolete fungi in the family Boletaceae. It was circumscribed by Chinese mycologists in 2014 with Rubroboletus sinicus as the type species. Species are characterized by having a reddish cap surface, yellow tubes on the underside of the cap, and an orange-red to blood-red pore surface. Pinkish to red spots (reticula) are present on the stipe surface, and a bluish color change occurs when the bolete flesh is injured. Rubroboletus mushrooms have an olive-brown spore print, and produce smooth spores. Eight species were included in the original circumscription (seven new combinations and one new species); five were added in 2015, and another in 2017.

Several species in this genus are poisonous, while the edibility of others remains entirely unknown. Nevertheless, the type species is occasionally sold for consumption in markets in Yunnan, China.

== Species ==
Image	Name	Year	Edibility	Distribution
	Rubroboletus demonensis Vasquez, Simonini, Svetash., Mikšík & Vizzini	2017		Southern Europe
	Rubroboletus dupainii (Boud.) Kuan Zhao & Zhu L.Yang	2014 (1902)		North Carolina, and then from Iowa, Europe
	Rubroboletus eastwoodiae (Murrill) D.Arora, C.F.Schwarz & J.L.Frank	2015 (1910)		West Coast of the United States
	Rubroboletus esculentus Zhao, K., Zhao, H.M.	2017		Sichuan Province in southwestern China
	Rubroboletus haematinus (Halling) D.Arora & J.L.Frank	2015 (1976)		western United States
	Rubroboletus latisporus Kuan Zhao & Zhu L.Yang	2014		China (Yunnan)
	Rubroboletus legaliae (Pilát & Dermek) Della Maggiora & Trassinelli	2015 (1969)		Southern England, and Europe
	Rubroboletus lupinus (Fr.) Costanzo, Gelardi, Simonini & Vizzini	2015 (1838)		Europe Mediterranean
	Rubroboletus pulcherrimus (Thiers & Halling) D.Arora, N.Siegel & J.L.Frank	2015 (1976)		United States (New Mexico and California to Washington)
	Rubroboletus pulchrotinctus (Alessio) Kuan Zhao & Zhu L.Yang	2014 (1985)		central and southern Europe.
	Rubroboletus rhodosanguineus (Both) Kuan Zhao & Zhu L.Yang	2014 (1998)		North America.
	Rubroboletus rhodoxanthus (Krombh.) Kuan Zhao & Zhu L.Yang	2014 ¨(1836)		southern Europe
	Rubroboletus satanas (Lenz) Kuan Zhao & Zhu L.Yang	2014 (1831)		Europe
	Rubroboletus sinicus (W.F.Chiu) Kuan Zhao & Zhu L.Yang	2014 (1948)		China.
