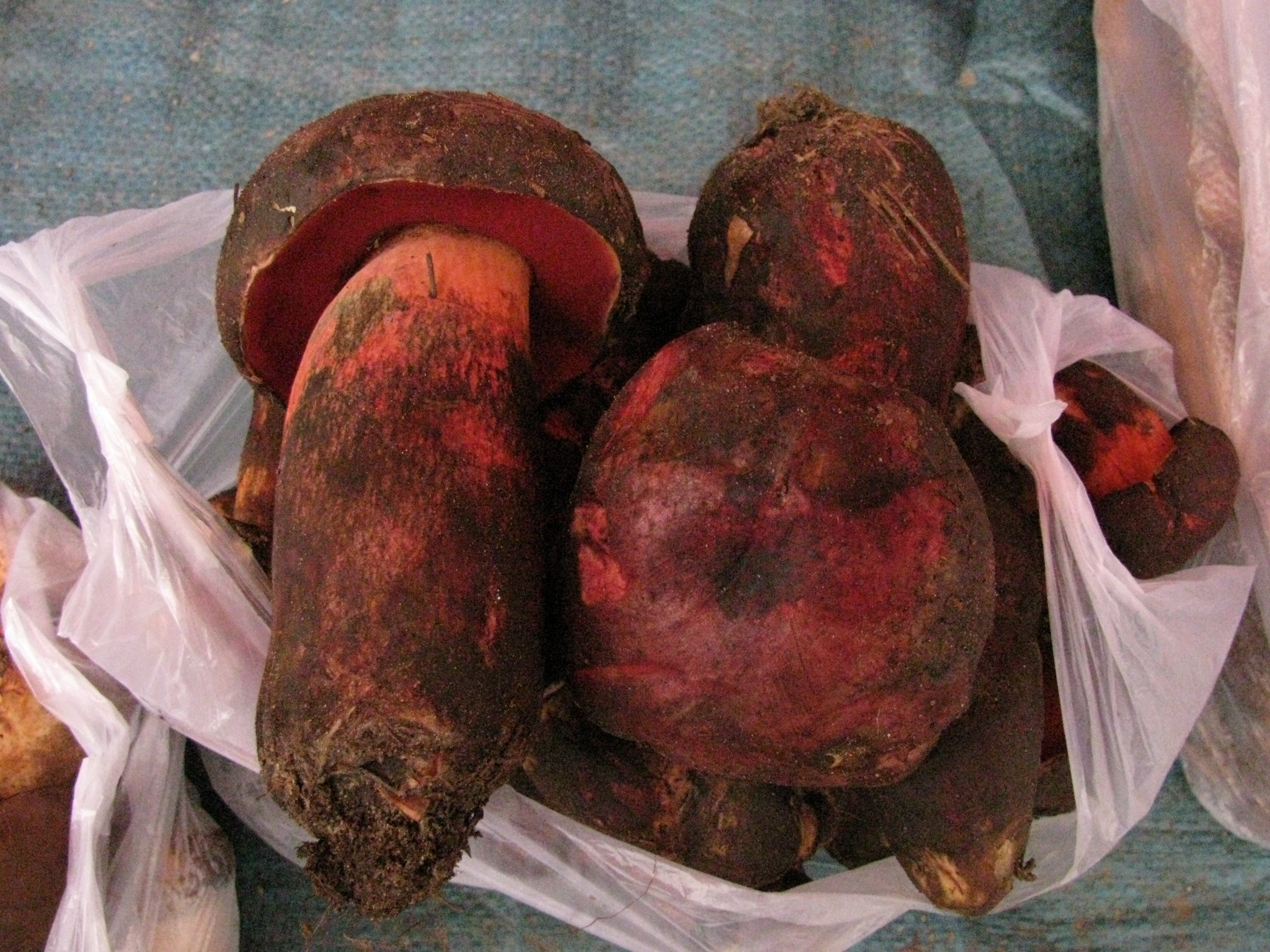

Scientific classification
- Kingdom: Fungi
- Division: Basidiomycota
- Class: Agaricomycetes
- Order: Boletales
- Family: Boletaceae
- Genus: Rubroboletus
- Species: R. sinicus

Binomial name
- Rubroboletus sinicus (W.F.Chiu) Kuan Zhao & Zhu L.Yang (2014)

Synonyms
- Boletus sinicus W.F.Chiu (1948); Tylopilus sinicus (W.F.Chiu) F.L.Tai (1979)

= Rubroboletus sinicus =

Species of fungus

Rubroboletus sinicus
- Mycological characteristics
- Pores on hymenium
- Cap is convex
- Hymenium is adnate
- Stipe is bare
- Spore print is olive-brown
- Ecology is mycorrhizal
- Edibility is unknown

Rubroboletus sinicus is a bolete fungus in the family Boletaceae. It is found in China. The species was first described by Wei Fan Chiu as Boletus sinicus in 1948 and transferred to the genus Tylopilus in 1979 by Fanglan Tai. In 2014, the genus Rubroboletus was created to accommodate this and allied species.

The fruit bodies of R. sinicus have a brown, pulvinate (cushion-shaped) cap measuring 9–11 cm (3.5–4.3 in), covered with fibrous scales. The tubes on the cap underside are up to 4 mm (0.16 in) long, and stain blue when cut or injured. The pores are red and small, up to 0.5 mm across. The flesh is initially white to yellowish, but stains blue with injury. Spores are ellipsoid and measure 7.5–11 by 4.5–5.5 μm. The type collection was obtained from a market in Kunming in July 1938.

== See also ==
- Hallucinogenic bolete mushroom - a group of similar looking Chinese boletes with hallucinogenic effects.
