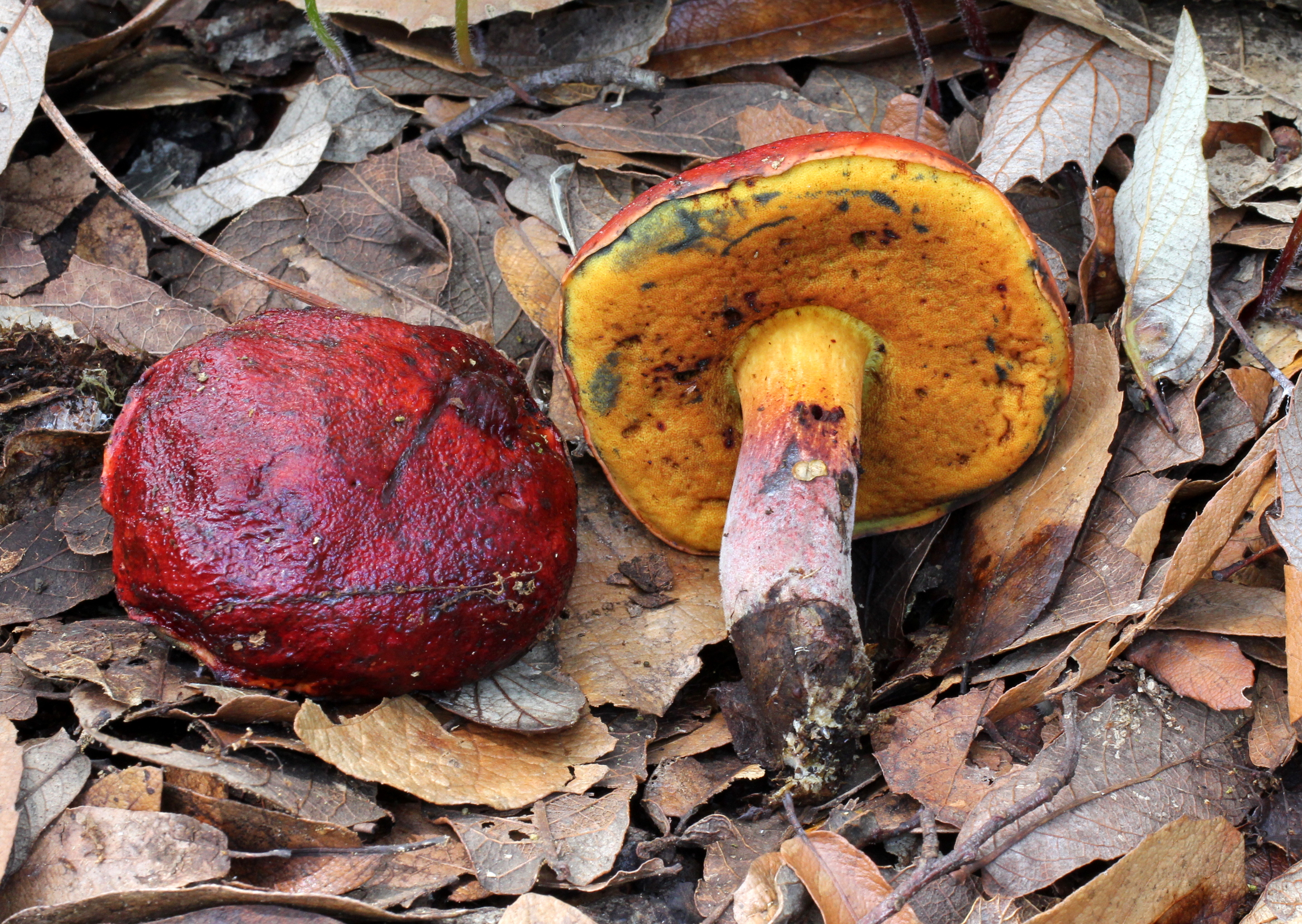

Conservation status
- Near Threatened (IUCN 3.1)

Scientific classification
- Kingdom: Fungi
- Division: Basidiomycota
- Class: Agaricomycetes
- Order: Boletales
- Family: Boletaceae
- Genus: Rubroboletus
- Species: R. dupainii

Binomial name
- Rubroboletus dupainii (Boud.) Kuan Zhao & Zhu L.Yang (2014)

Synonyms
- Boletus dupainii Boud. (1902); Tubiporus dupainii (Boud.) Maire (1937)

= Rubroboletus dupainii =

Species of fungus

Rubroboletus dupainii Mycological characteristics
- Pores on hymenium
- Cap is convex
- Hymenium is adnate
- Stipe is bare
- Spore print is olive-brown
- Ecology is mycorrhizal
- Edibility is unknown

Rubroboletus dupainii, commonly known as Dupain's bolete, is a bolete fungus of the genus Rubroboletus. It is native to Europe, where it is threatened, and red listed in six countries. It also occurs in North America, although it is rare there. It was first recorded from North Carolina, and then from Iowa in 2009. It was reported from Belize in 2007, growing under Quercus peduncularis - a species of oak tree.

The bolete was first described scientifically by French mycologist Jean Louis Émile Boudier in 1902. It was transferred to the new genus Rubroboletus in 2014 along with several other allied reddish colored, blue-staining bolete species. Phylogenetically, R. dupainii is the sister species of Rubroboletus lupinus.

== See also ==
- List of North American boletes
