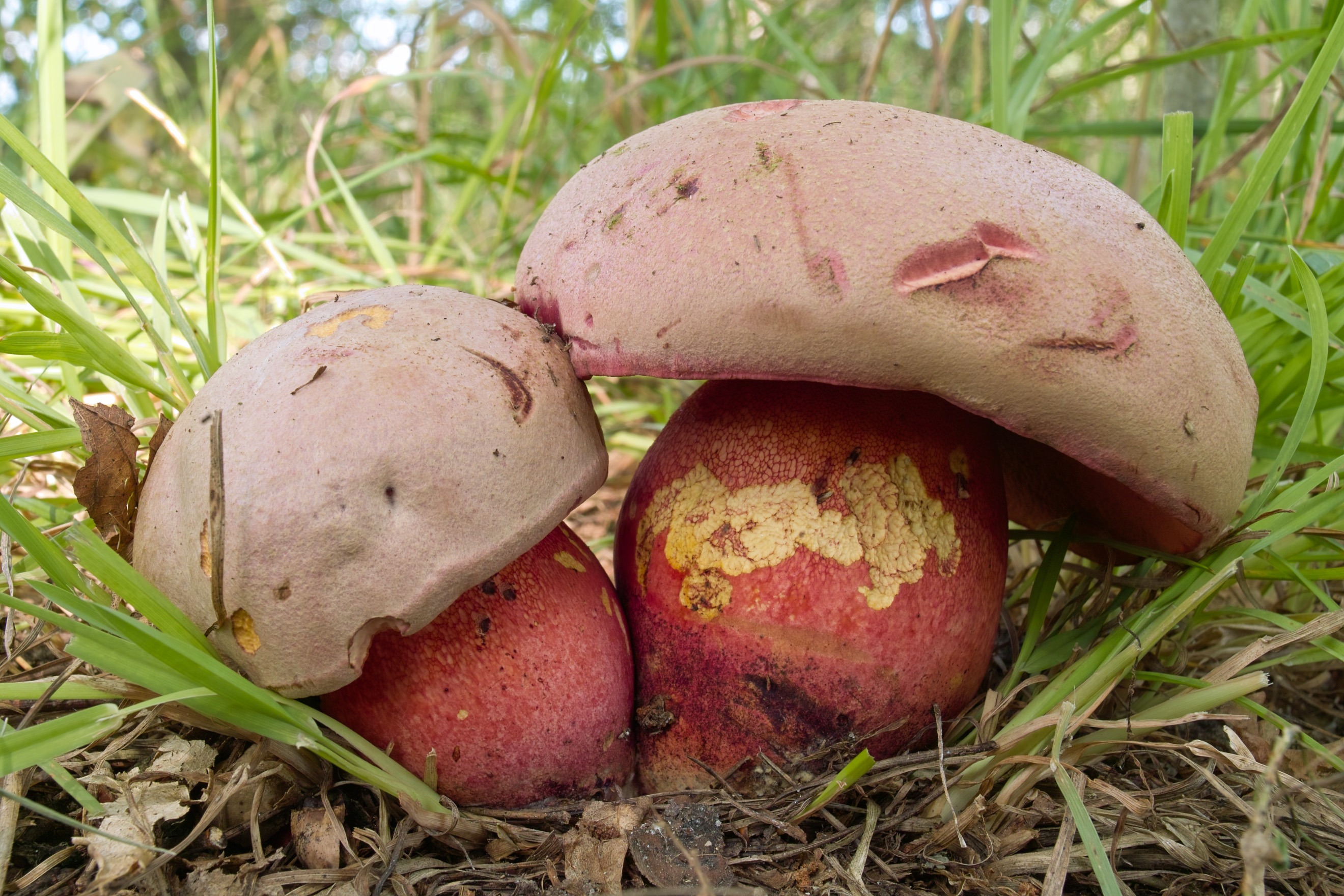

Scientific classification
- Kingdom: Fungi
- Division: Basidiomycota
- Class: Agaricomycetes
- Order: Boletales
- Family: Boletaceae
- Genus: Rubroboletus
- Species: R. legaliae

Binomial name
- Rubroboletus legaliae (Pilát & Dermek) Della Maggiora & Trassinelli (2015)

Synonyms
- Boletus splendidus C.Martín (1894); Boletus legaliae Pilát (1968); Boletus satanoides sensu auct. mult.; Boletus spinari Hlaváček (2000)

= Rubroboletus legaliae =

Rubroboletus legaliae Mycological characteristics
- Pores on hymenium
- Cap is convex
- Hymenium is adnate
- Stipe is bare
- Spore print is olive-brown
- Ecology is mycorrhizal
- Edibility is poisonous

Rubroboletus legaliae, previously known as Boletus splendidus, B. satanoides, and B. legaliae is a basidiomycete fungus of the family Boletaceae. It is poisonous, with predominantly gastrointestinal symptoms, and is related to Rubroboletus satanas.

It's uncommon in Southern England, and Europe, and grows with oak (Quercus) and beech (Fagus) often on neutral to acid soils. It is considered vulnerable in the Czech Republic. In Britain, all of the boletes in the Satanas group are either very rare, endangered, or extinct.

== Taxonomy ==
Boletus legaliae was described by Czech mycologist Albert Pilát in 1968. It is named after the French mycologist Marcelle Le Gal.

Boletus splendidus as described by Charles-Édouard Martín in 1894 is a synonym. The description of Boletus satanoides was too vague to be ascribed to any actual species. Boletus legaliae was transferred to the genus Rubroboletus in 2015 by Marco Della Maggiora and Renzo Trassinelli.

== Description ==
The cap is initially off-white, or coffee-coloured at the button stage. In mid life it often (but not always) turns a pale mouse grey. In old age the cap turns reddish, or what has been described as 'old rose'. It may reach 14 cm (5.5 in) in diameter.

The stipe is stocky, with a narrow red reticulation (net pattern) on an orange ground at the apex. This orange ground colour fades gradually towards the midsection, making the red reticulation more pronounced. At the base the reticulation is absent, and the stipe turns dark vinaceous. Sometimes the stipe detail can be faint, or even absent when covered with earth or leaf litter. The pores are initially red, but have an overall orange colour when mature, and they bruise blue. The flesh turns pale blue on cutting / dark vinaceous in the stipe base. Often this blueing process is very slow, sometimes taking a minute or so for the flesh to turn a light blue. In other situations, blueing is near-instant. The flesh is said to smell of chicory.

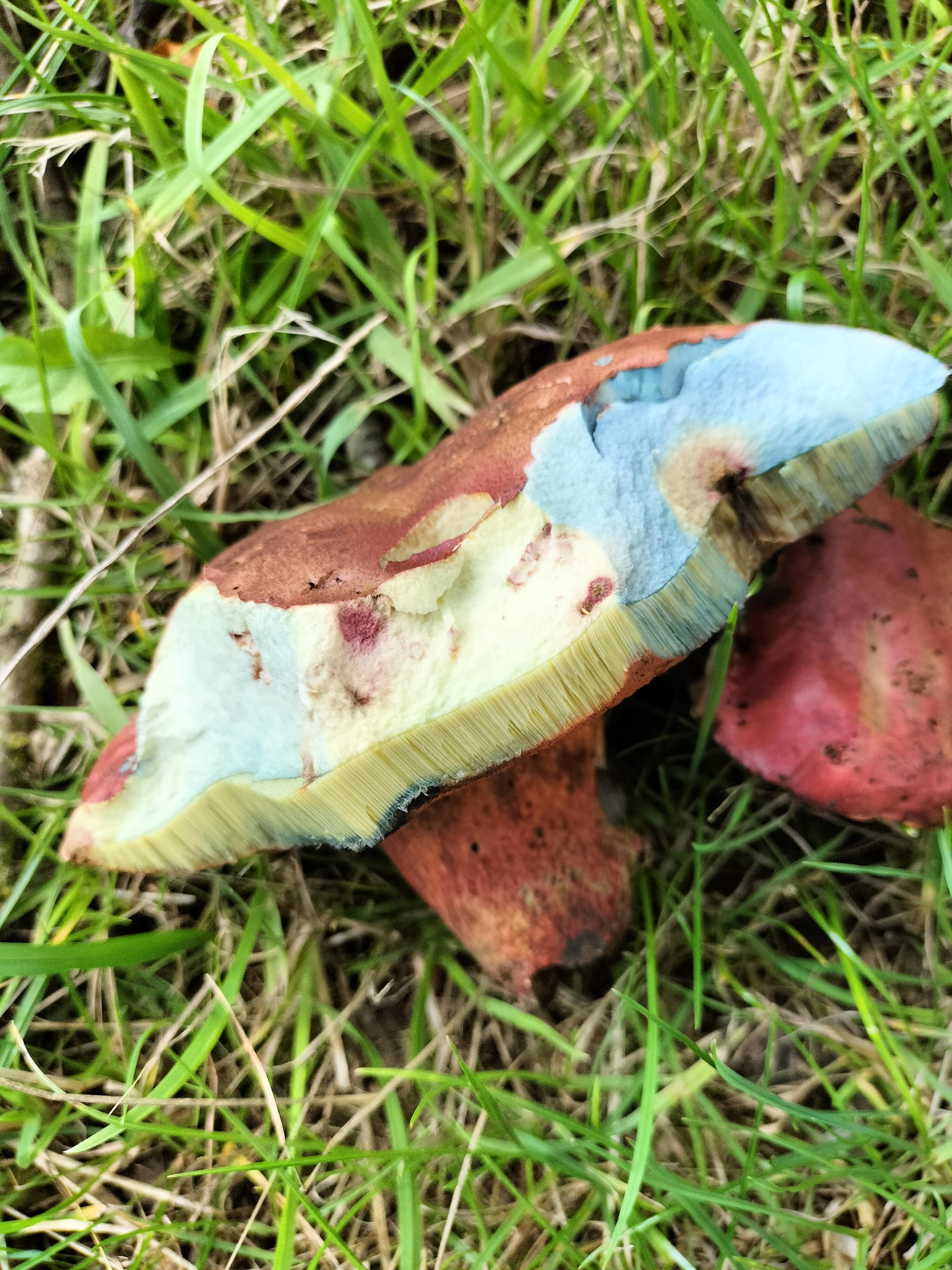
R. legaliae bruising: Typically, the pale yellow flesh slowly turns light blue

== Occurrence in the UK ==
R. legaliae is an uncommon to rare species in the UK, commonly occurring in open woodland or parkland with plenty of sun on neutral-to-acidic soil. Assessed as 'Vulnerable' by the JNCC, it has a population of around 560 mature specimens. An unusual morph with bright yellow pores has been recorded from Windsor Great Park, Berkshire, sometimes growing alongside normal-pored variants.

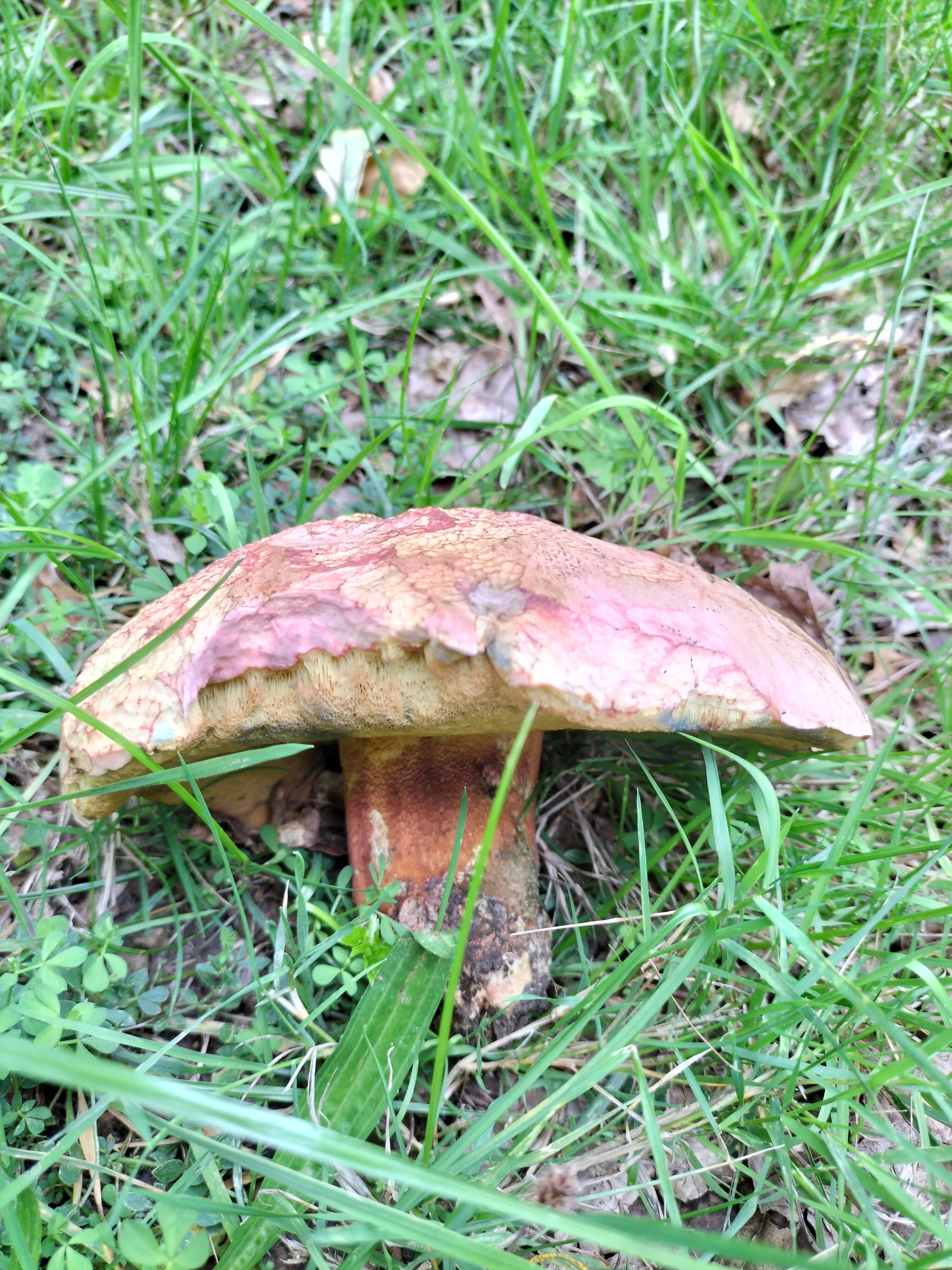
Rubroboletus legaliae with unusual yellow pores. Windsor

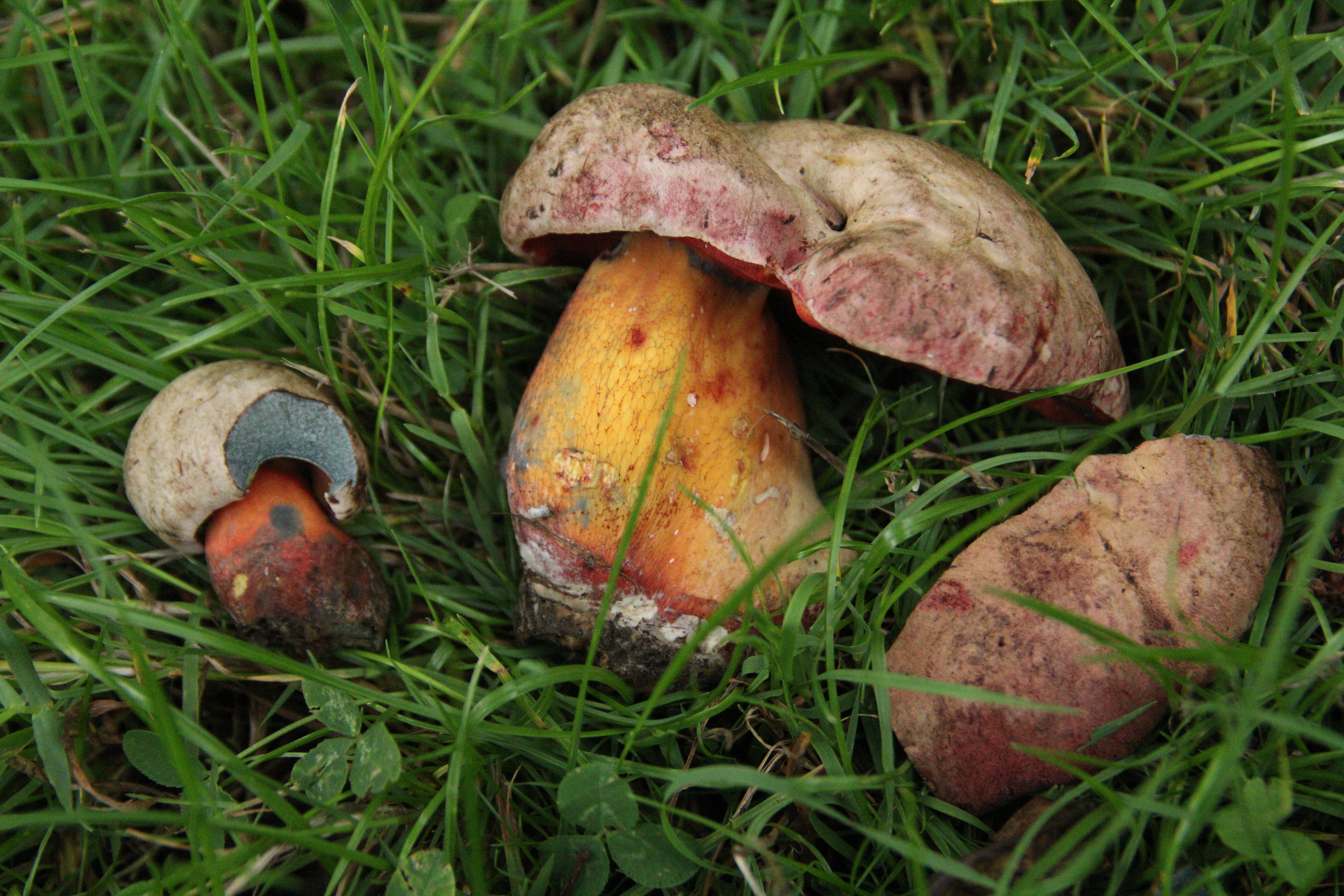
Collection on the edge of a road. Windsor

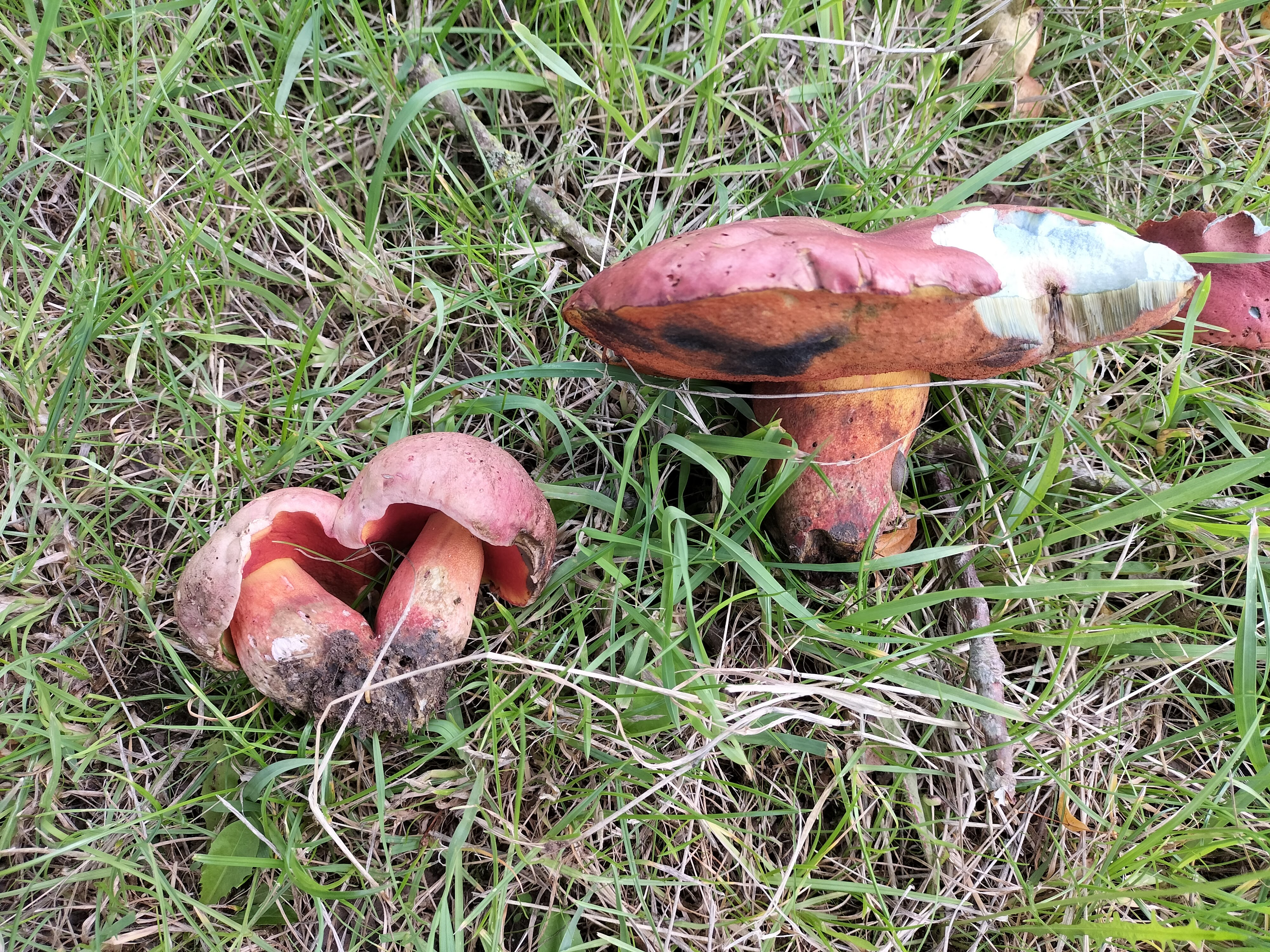
This collection was found growing near oaks on the edge of arable land in Suffolk. Caps entirely flushed red when mature

=== Similar species ===
Rubroboletus satanas, found in broad-leaved woodland on calcareous soil, has a whiter cap that turns brownish-ochre, lacking the overall reddish tones in maturity. It has a more nauseating smell. Molecular study of the holotype of Rubroboletus spinari has demonstrated its conspecifity with Rubroboletus legaliae.
