= Estonian Science Photo Competition =

Estonian photography competition

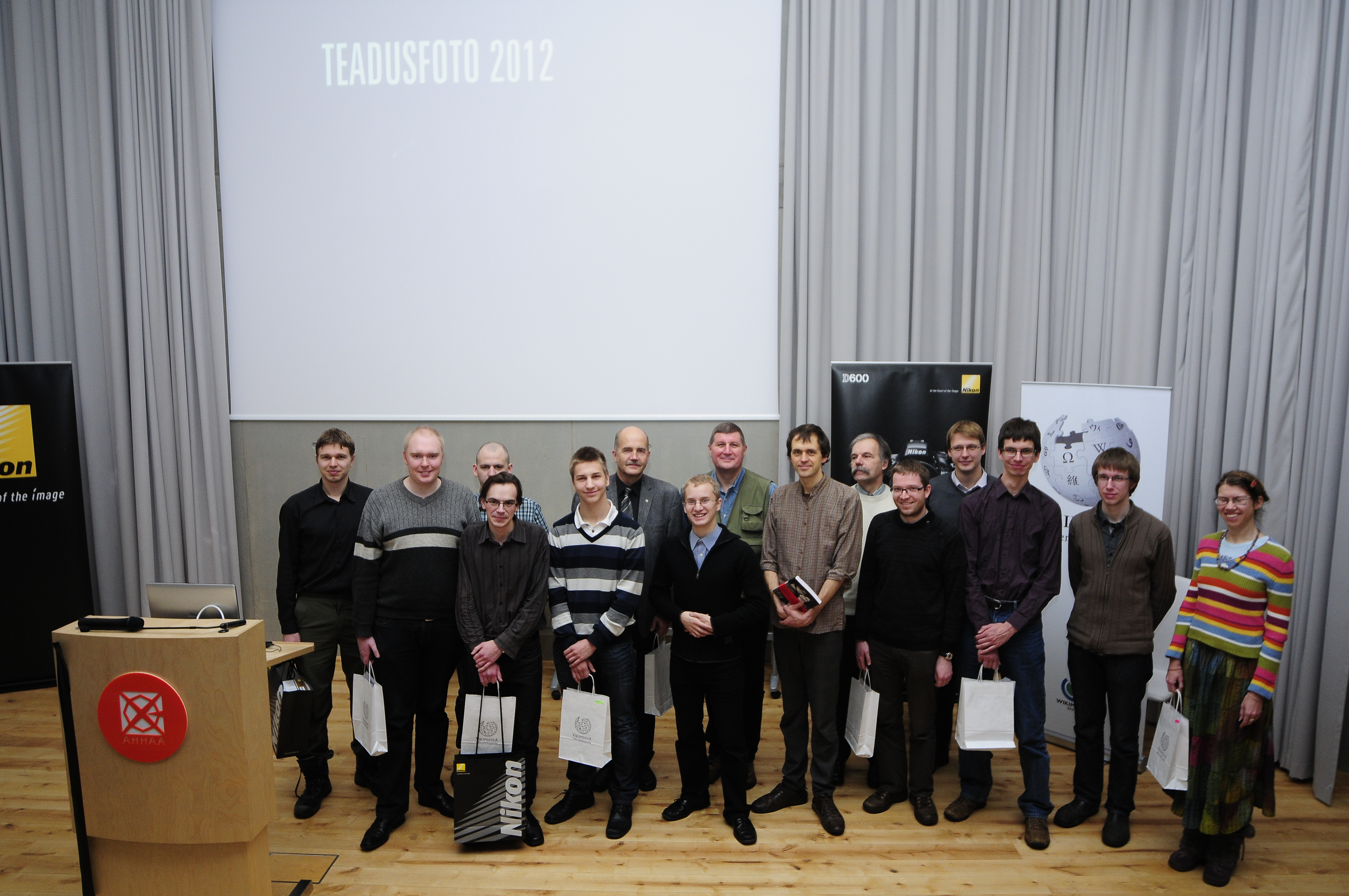
Winners and jury of Estonian Science Photo Competition 2012

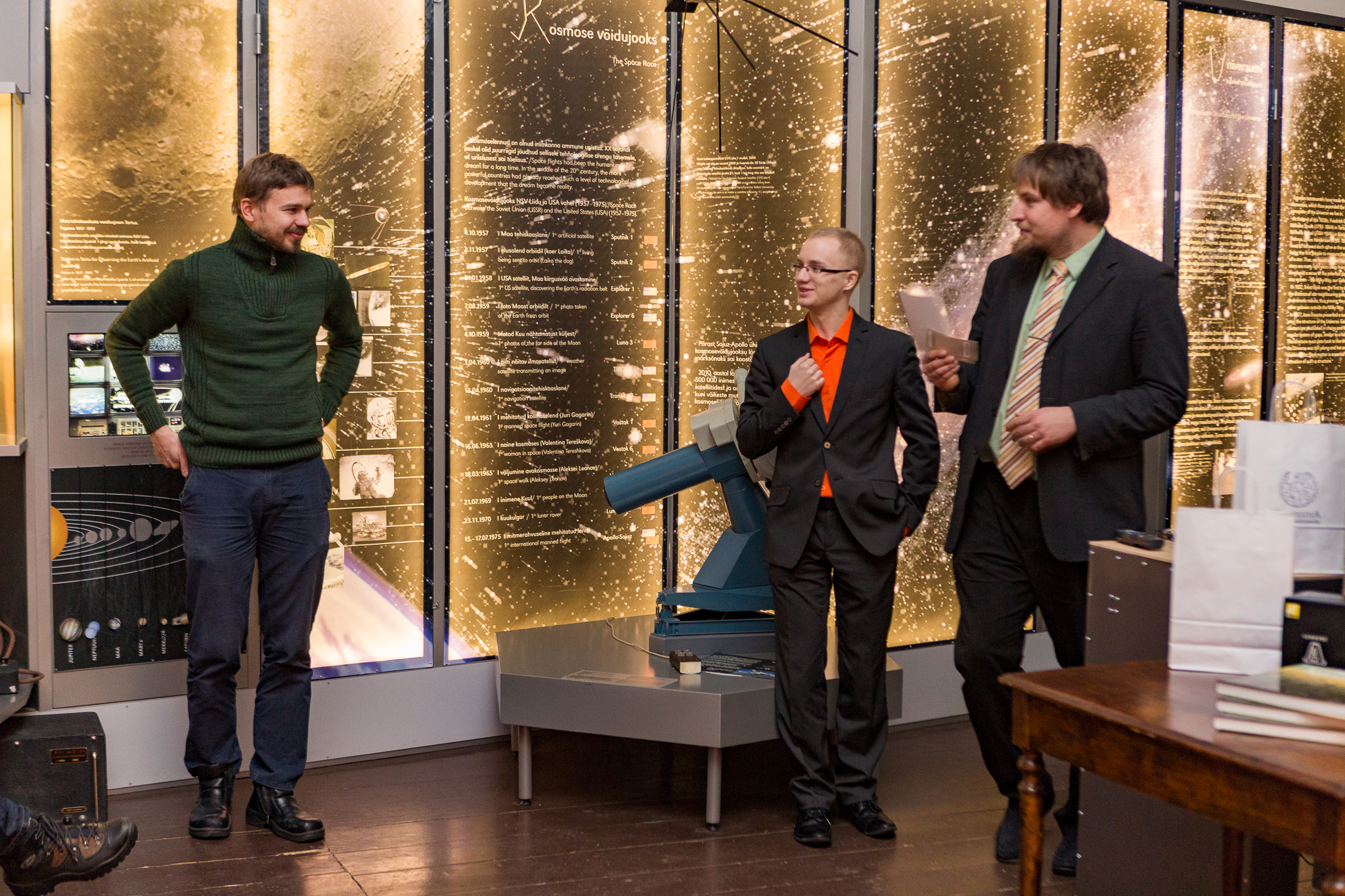
Awarding ceremony in University of Tartu Old Observatory in 2015

The Estonian Science Photo Competition (Estonian: teadusfoto võistlus) is a photography competition that aims to popularize science and make more science related images freely available.

It has acted as an inspiration for European Science Photo Competition first held in 2015 and Wiki Science Competition first held in 2017.

== History ==
The competition was first held in 2006 (image collection process started already in 2005). In 2006 and 2007 it was organized by an Estonian science journalist Tiit Kändler.

It was relaunched in 2011 and organized by wikipedian Ivo Kruusamägi. It was now held in Wikipedia and the submitted images were given under free licence. Competition also took place in 2012 and 2013.

In 2015 this event was held as a part of European Science Photo Competition. This contest involved 40 countries, over 2,200 people, and nearly 10,000 images. This was again organized by Ivo Kruusamägi and it won the 2nd prize of the Estonian Science Communication Award in the category of science and technology communication via audio-visual and electronic media.

In 2017 it was held as a worldwide Wiki Science Competition and it once again collected around 10,000 images.

Maxim Bilovitskiy from Estonia also won the Non-photographic media category in the European Science Photo Competition 2015 and in Wiki Science Competition 2017.

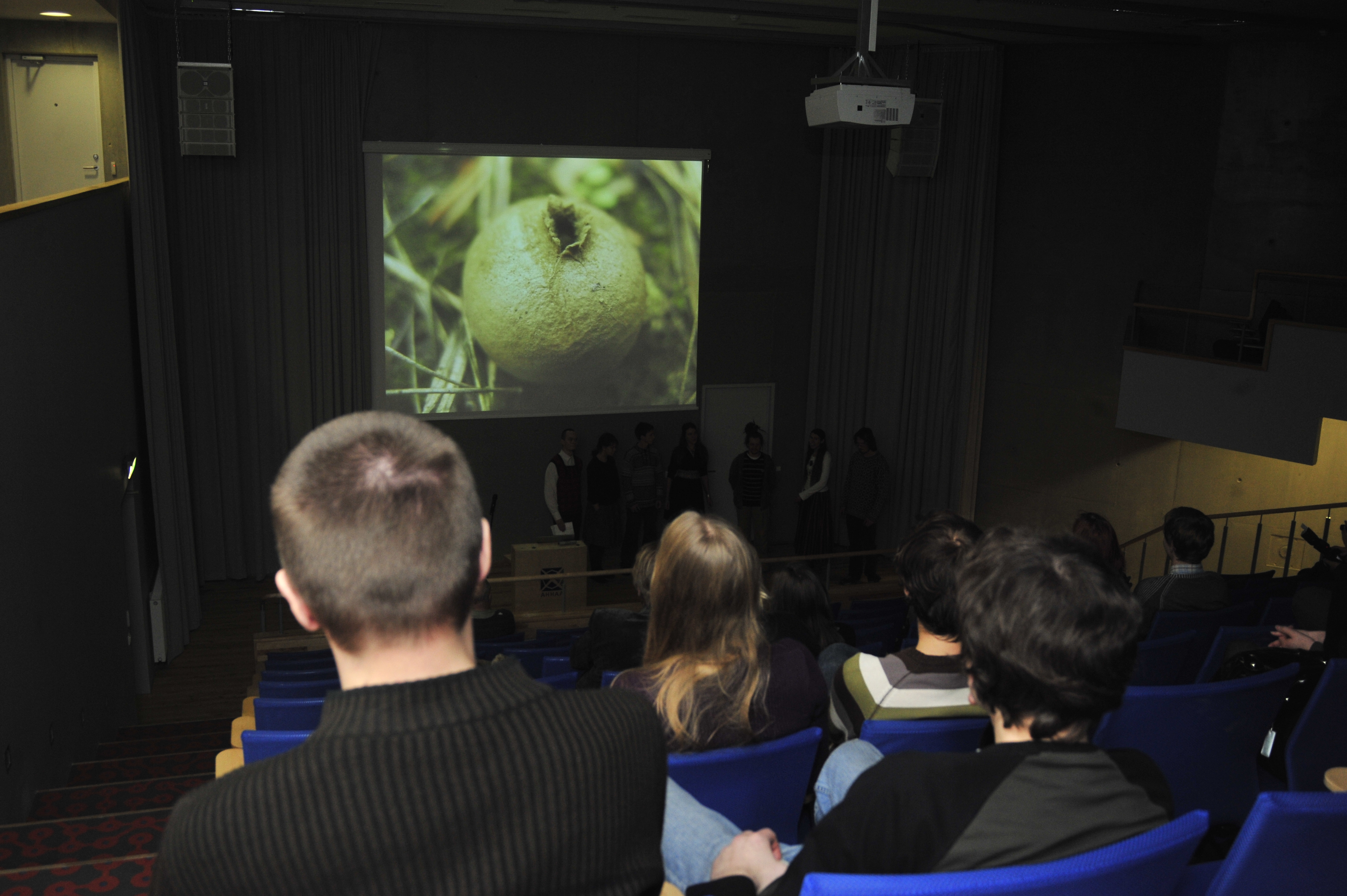
2011

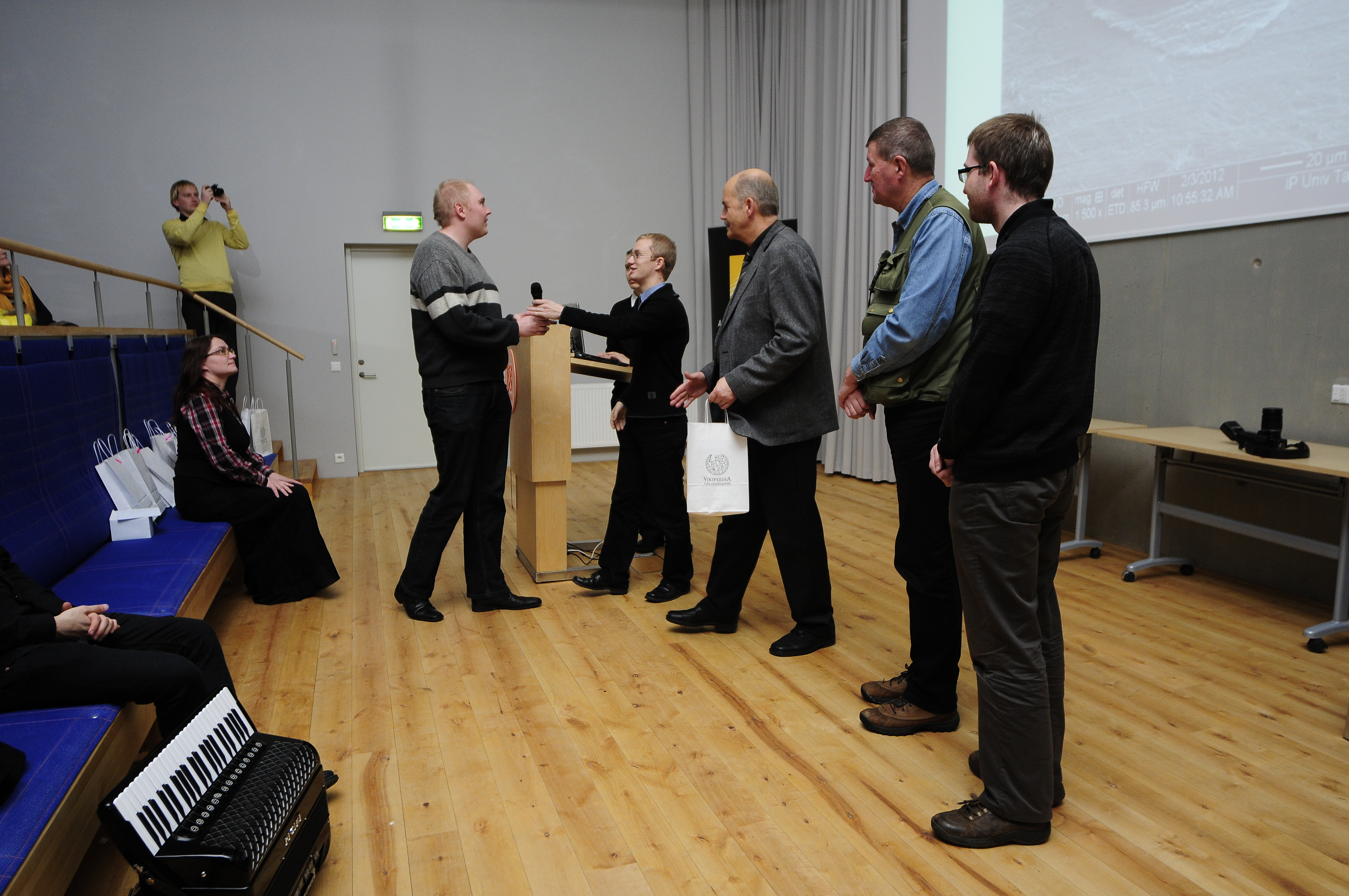
2012

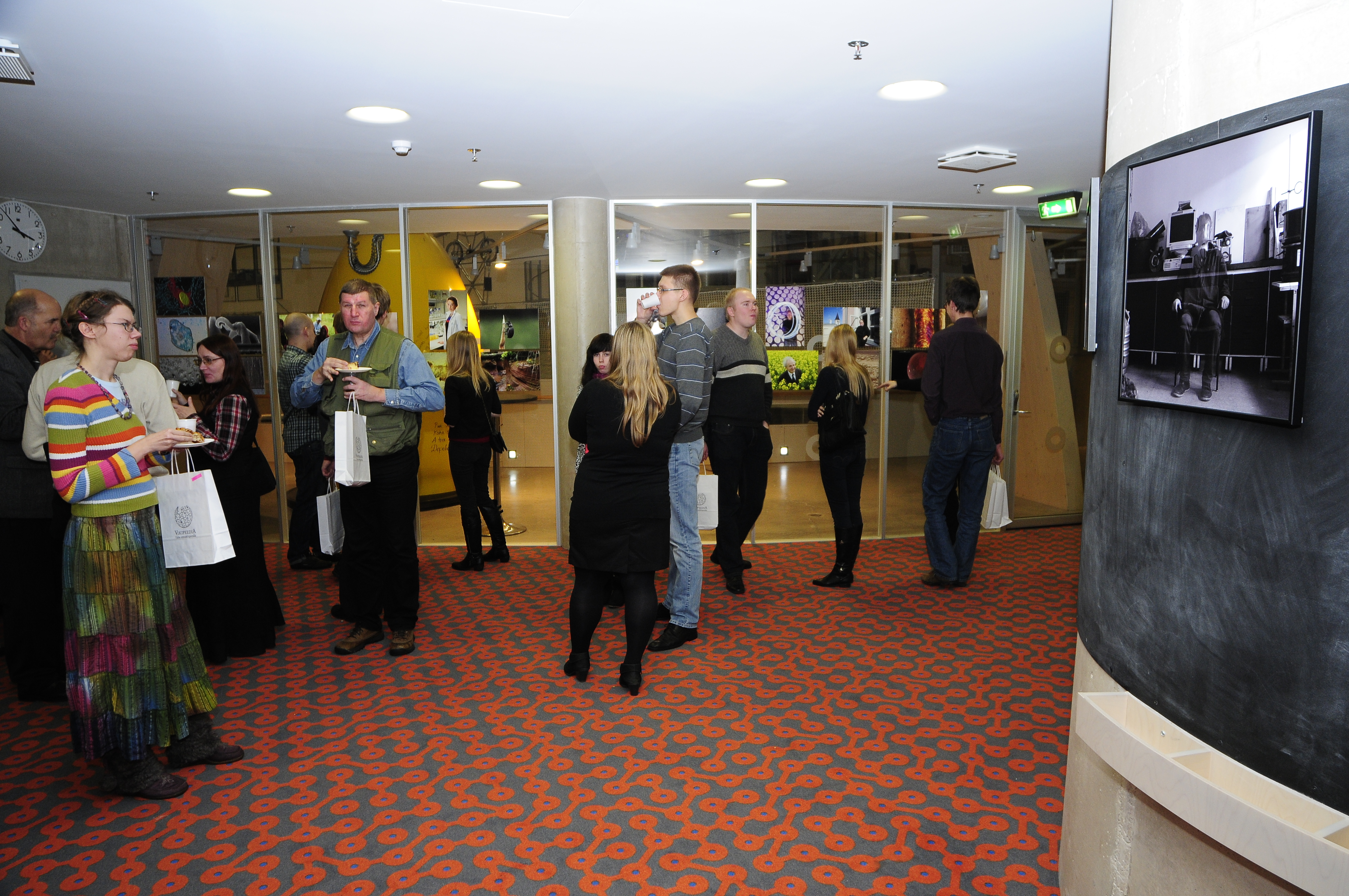
2012

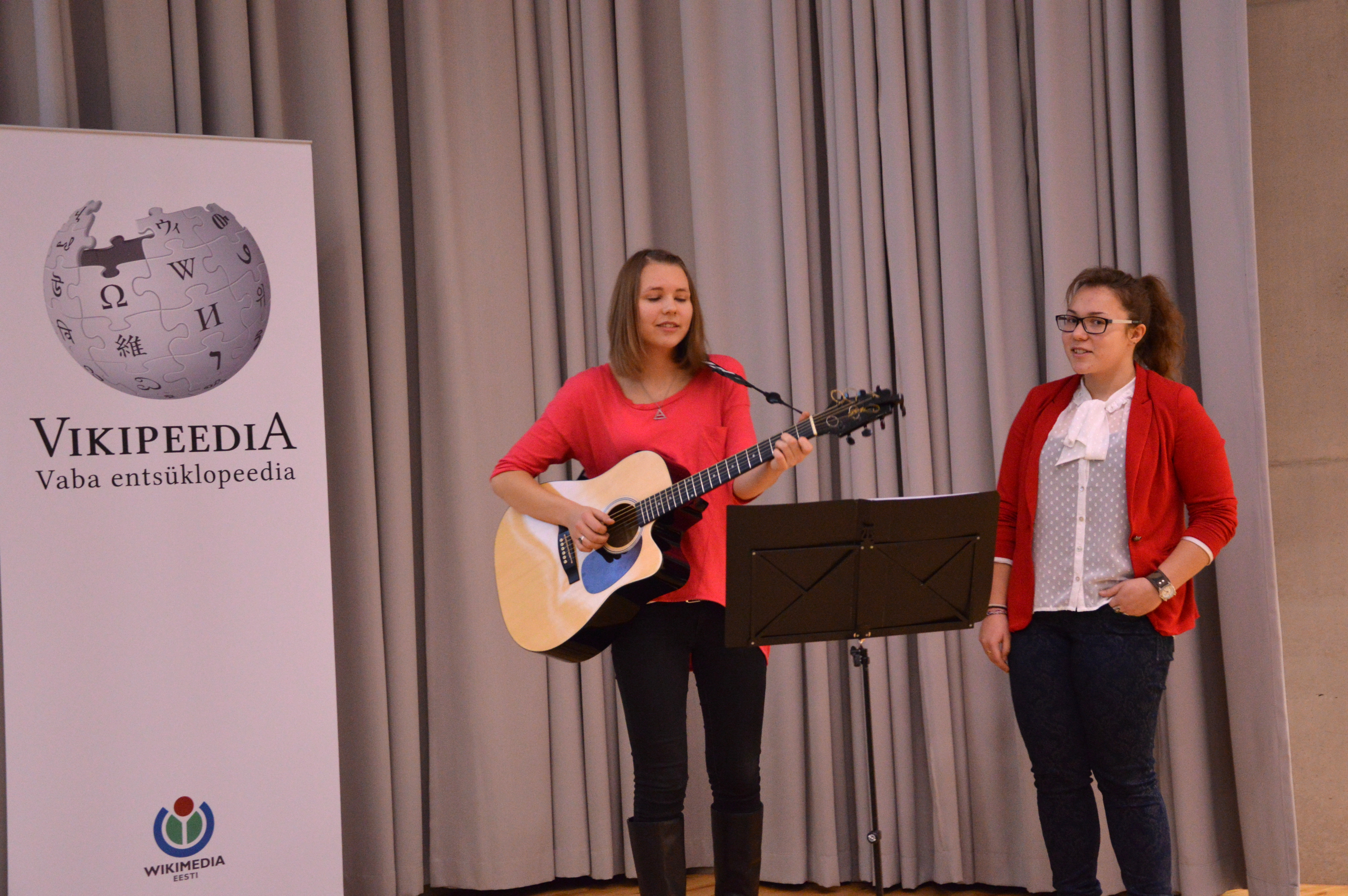
2013

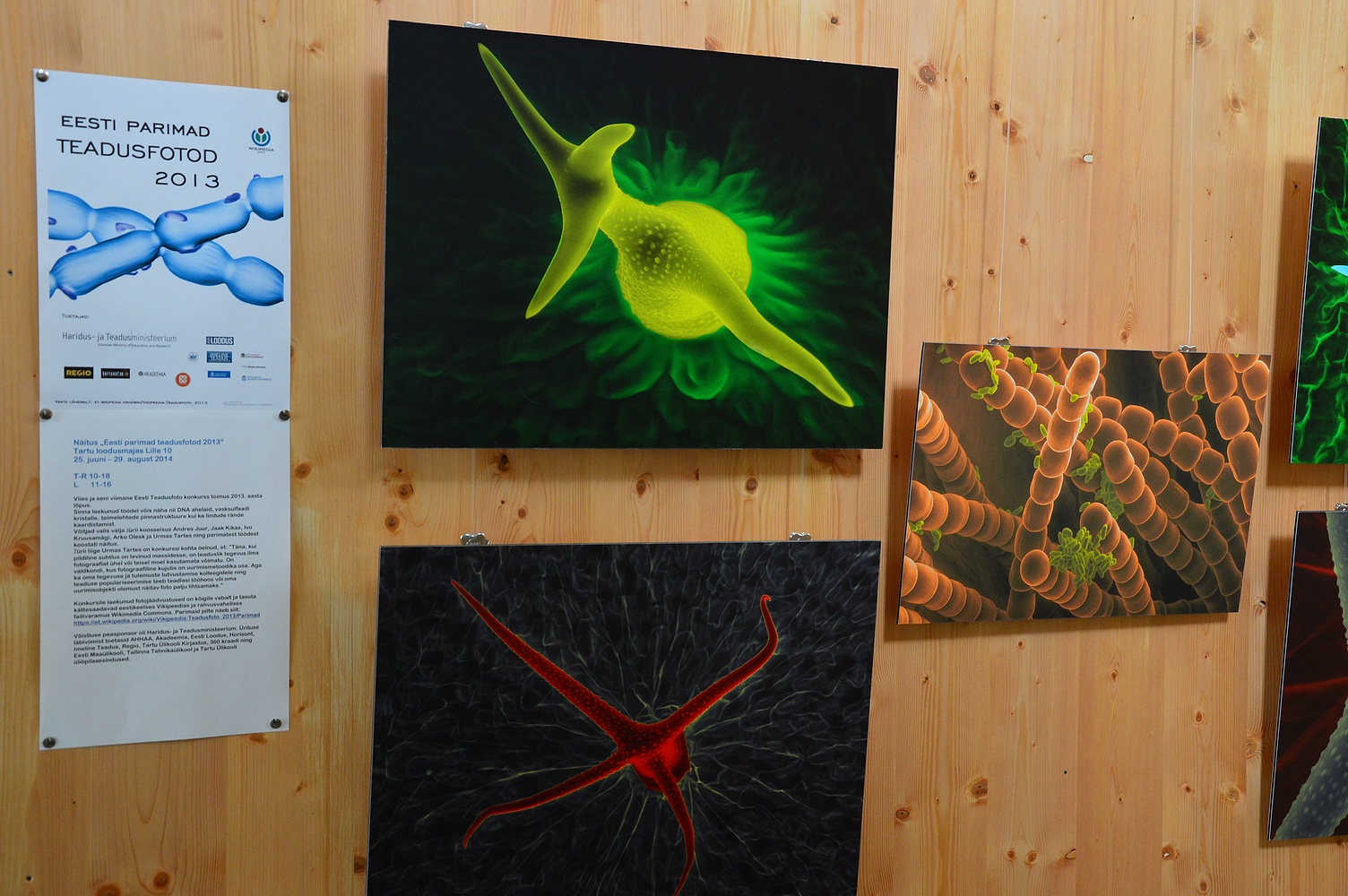
2013

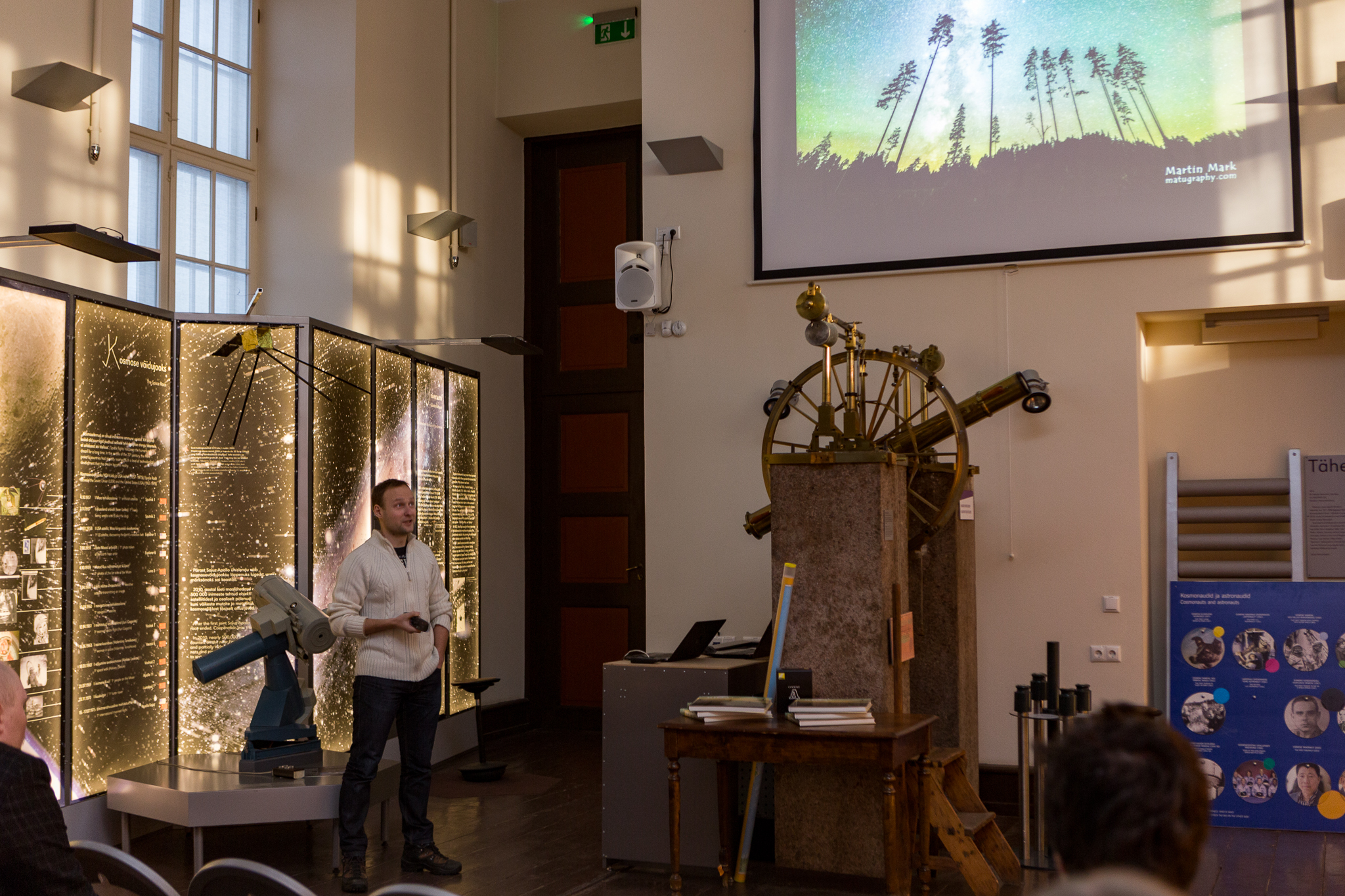
2015

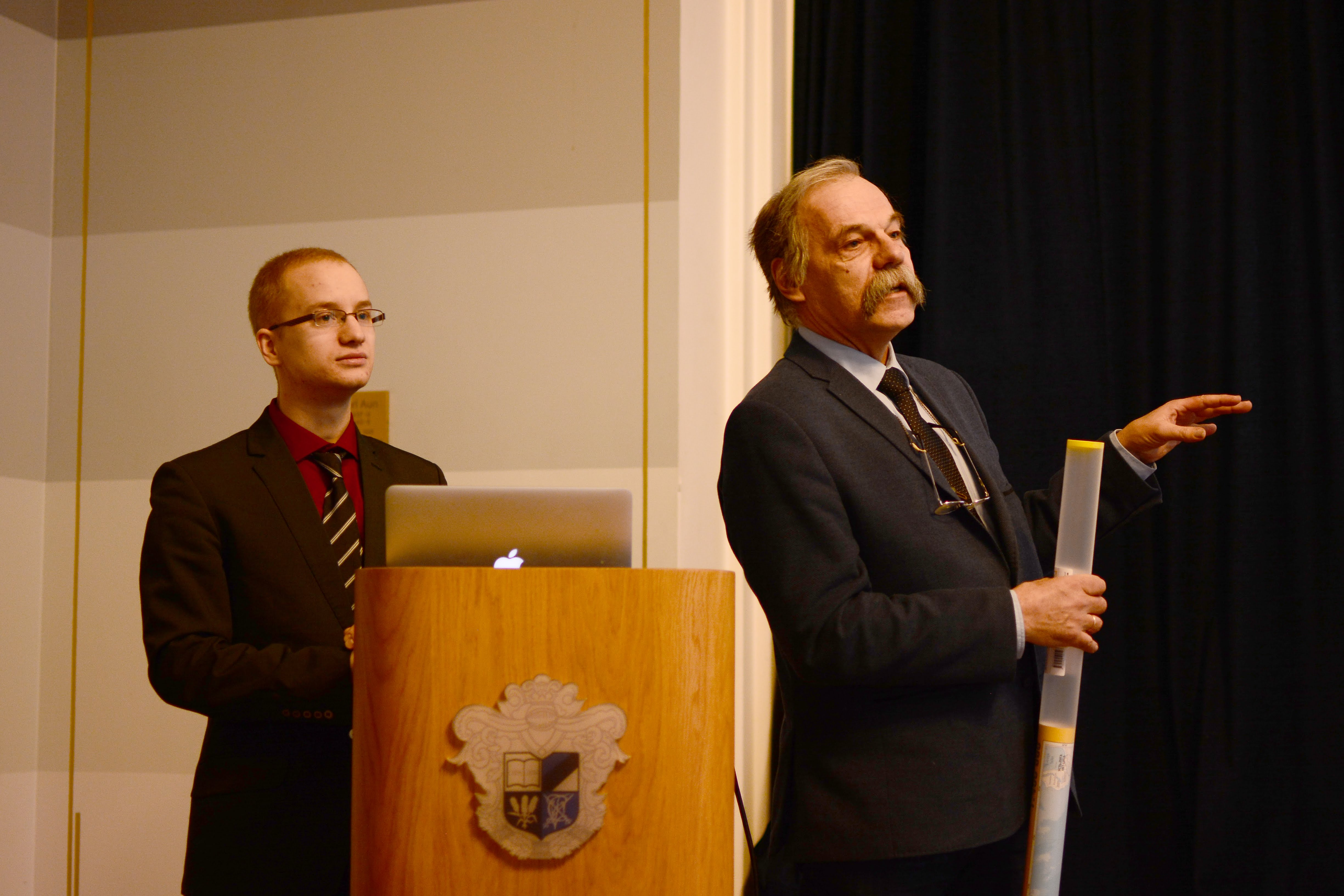
2017

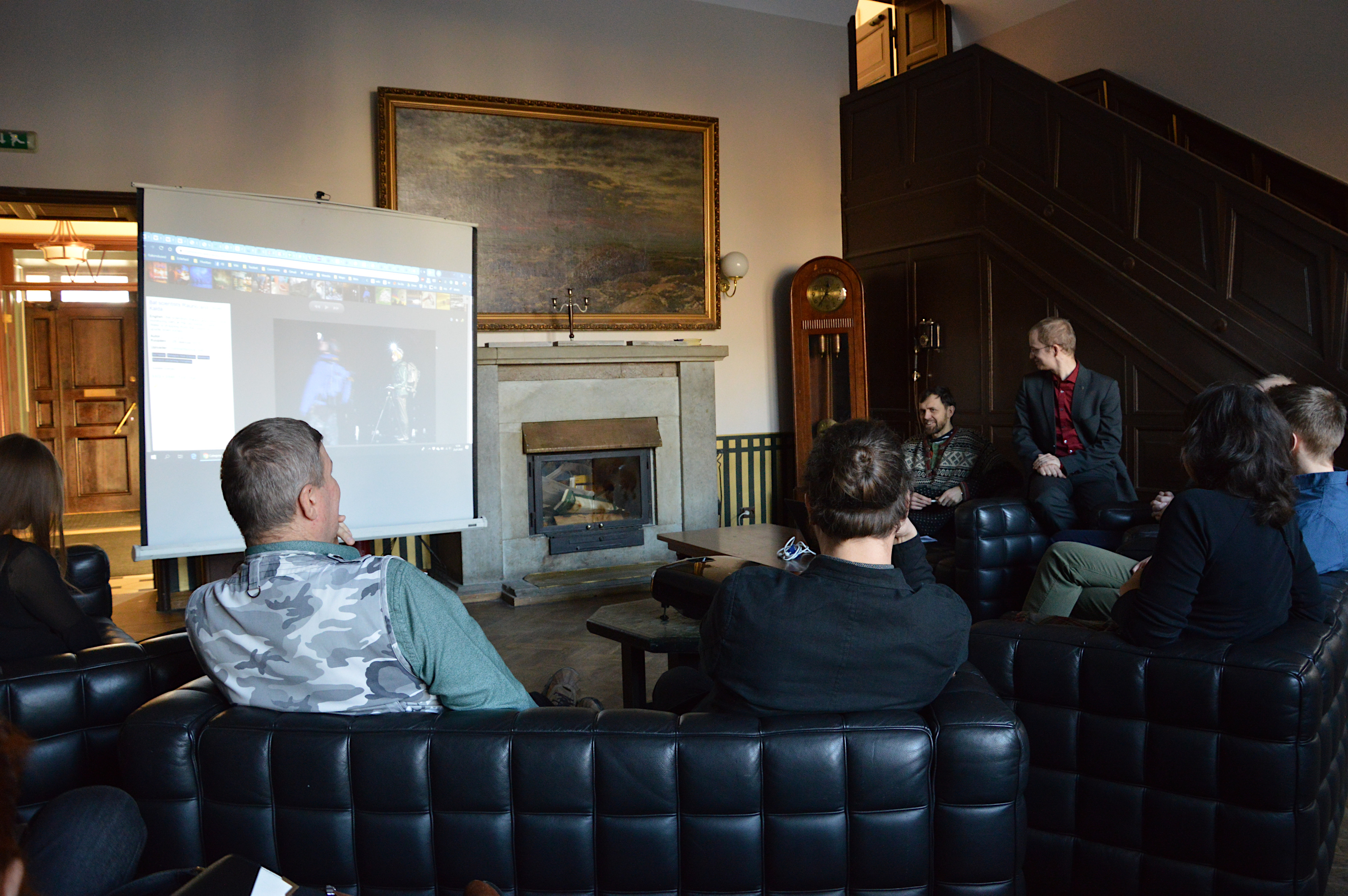
2019

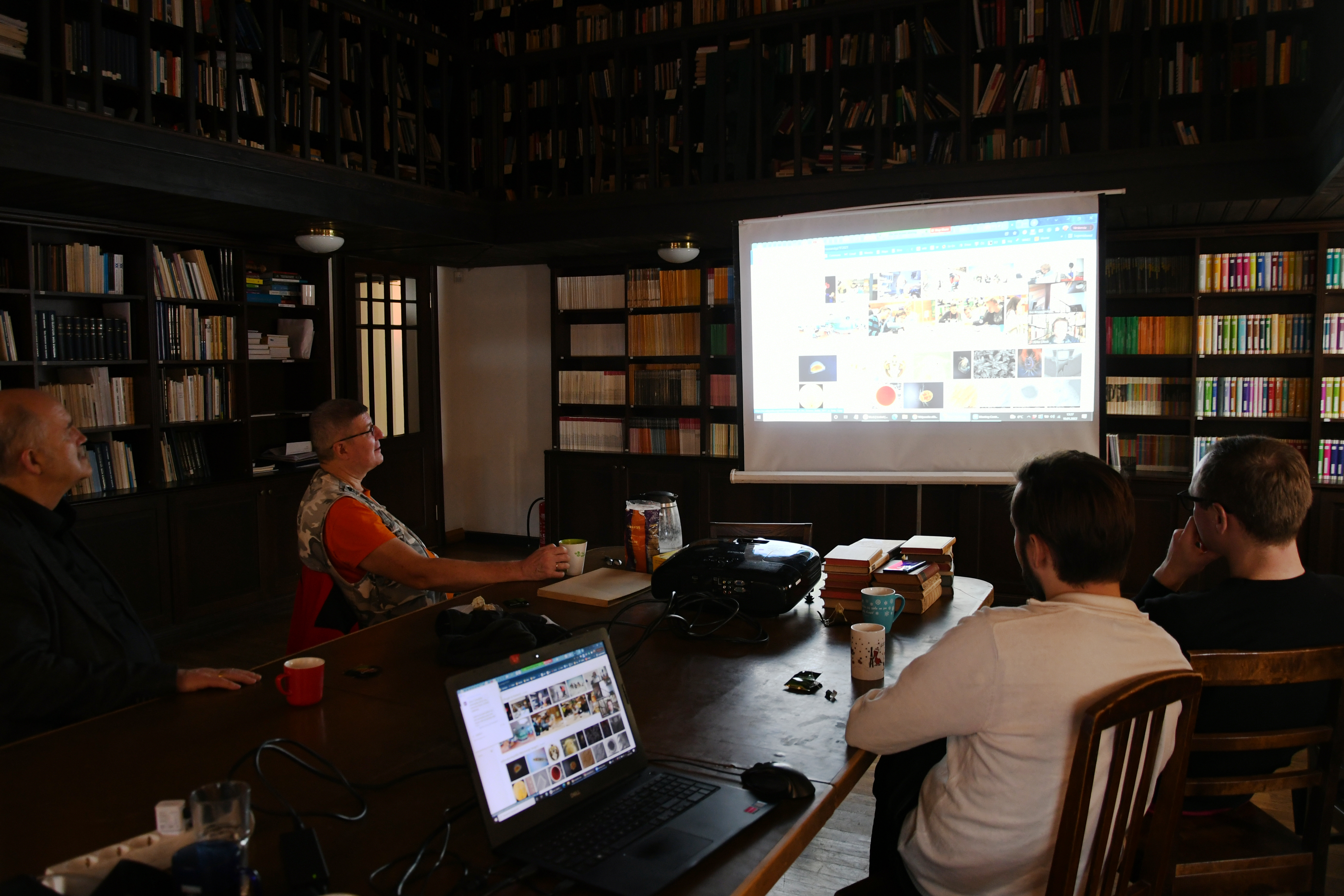
2021

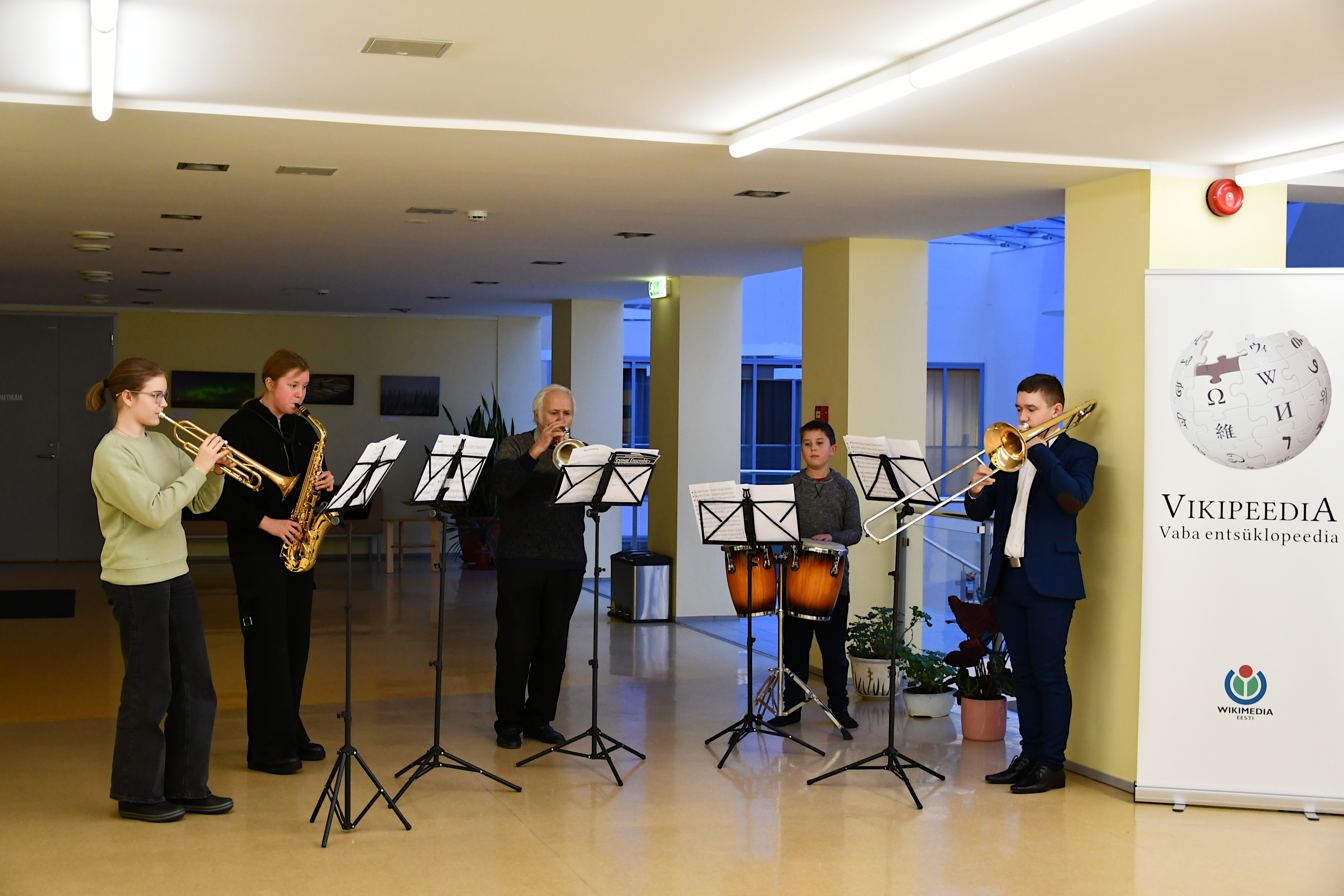
2023

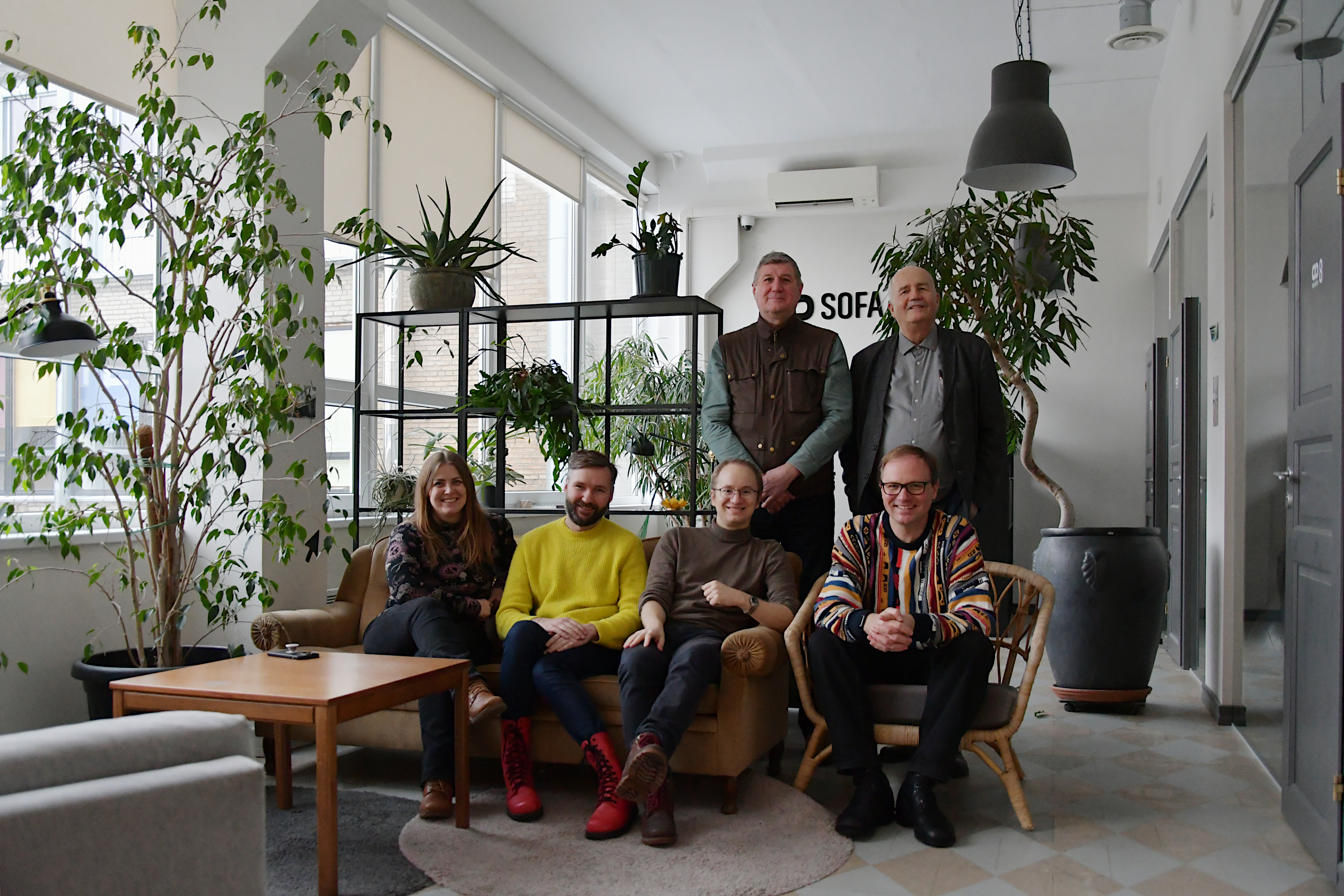
Jury for 2025 competition

== Winners ==
- 2006 – Ivar Jüssi
- 2007 – Heiti Paves
- 2011 – Timo Palo
- 2012 – Toomas Jagomäe
- 2013 – Heiti Paves
- 2015 – Tavo Romann
- 2017 – Kertu Liis Krigul
- 2019 – Tavo Romann
- 2021 – Peeter Paaver
- 2023 – Enno Merivee
- 2025 – Janek Lass

== Example images ==
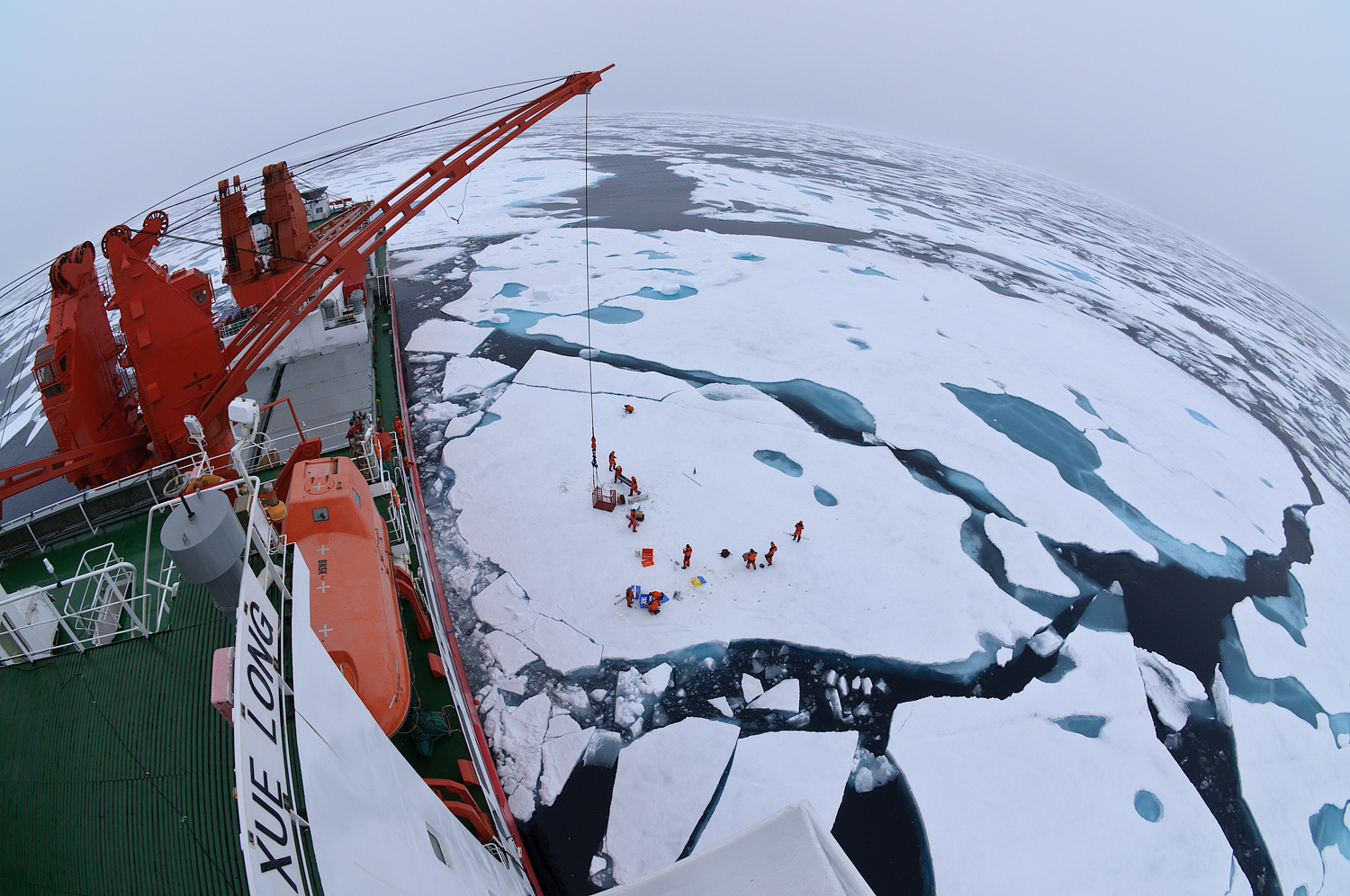
Drifting ice camp in the middle of the Arctic Ocean

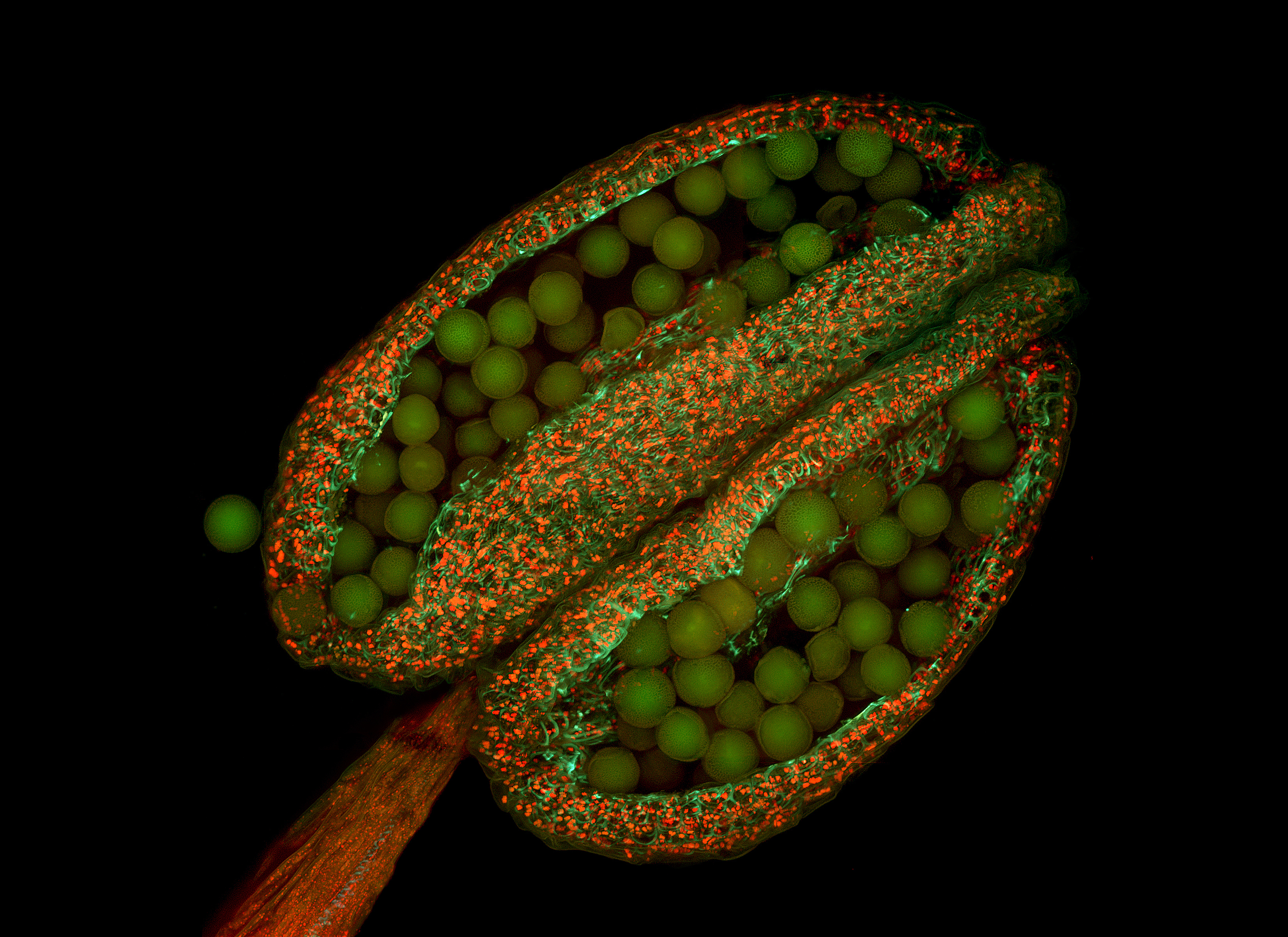
Anther of the thale cress

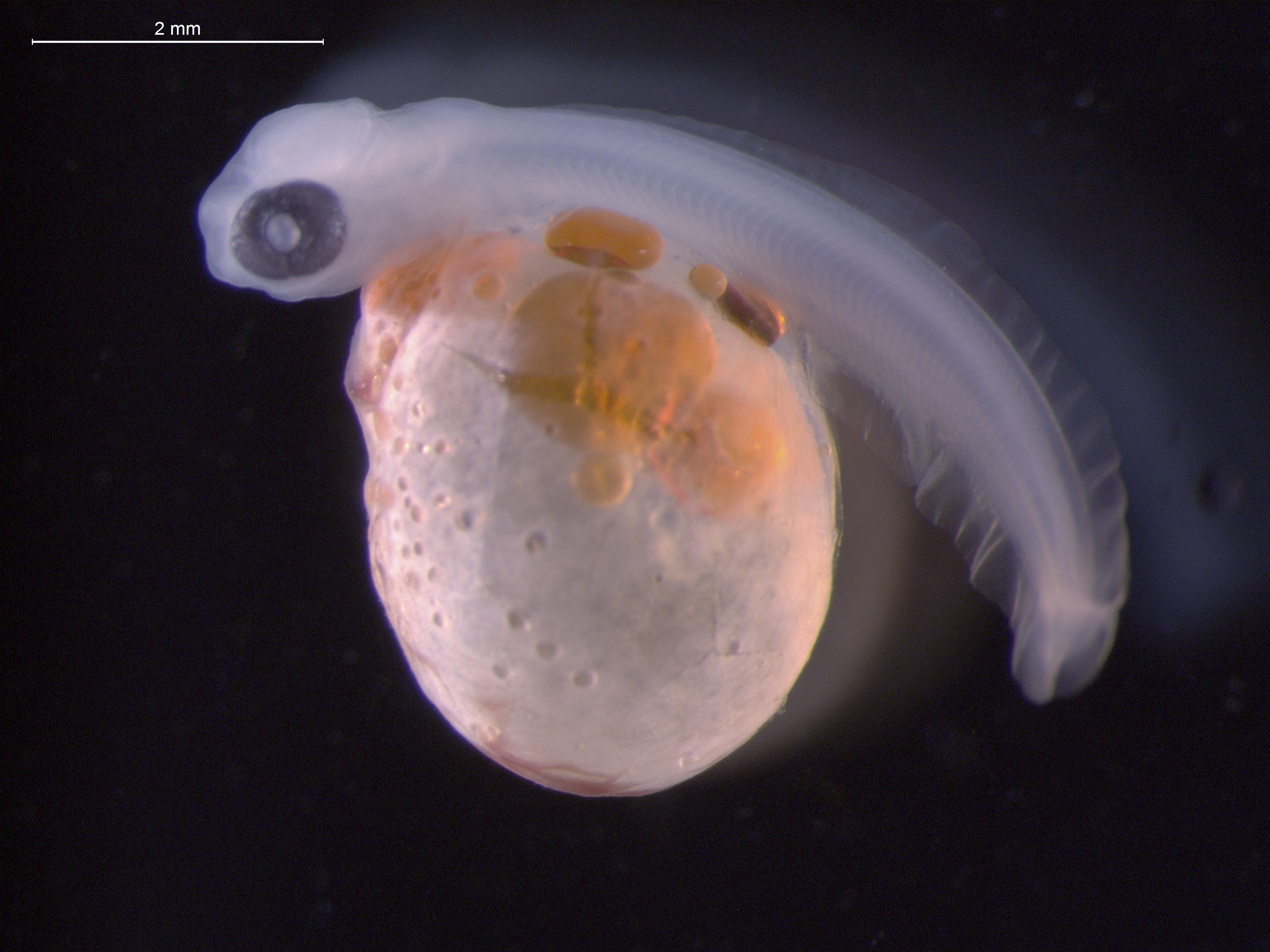
Newly hatched rainbow trout

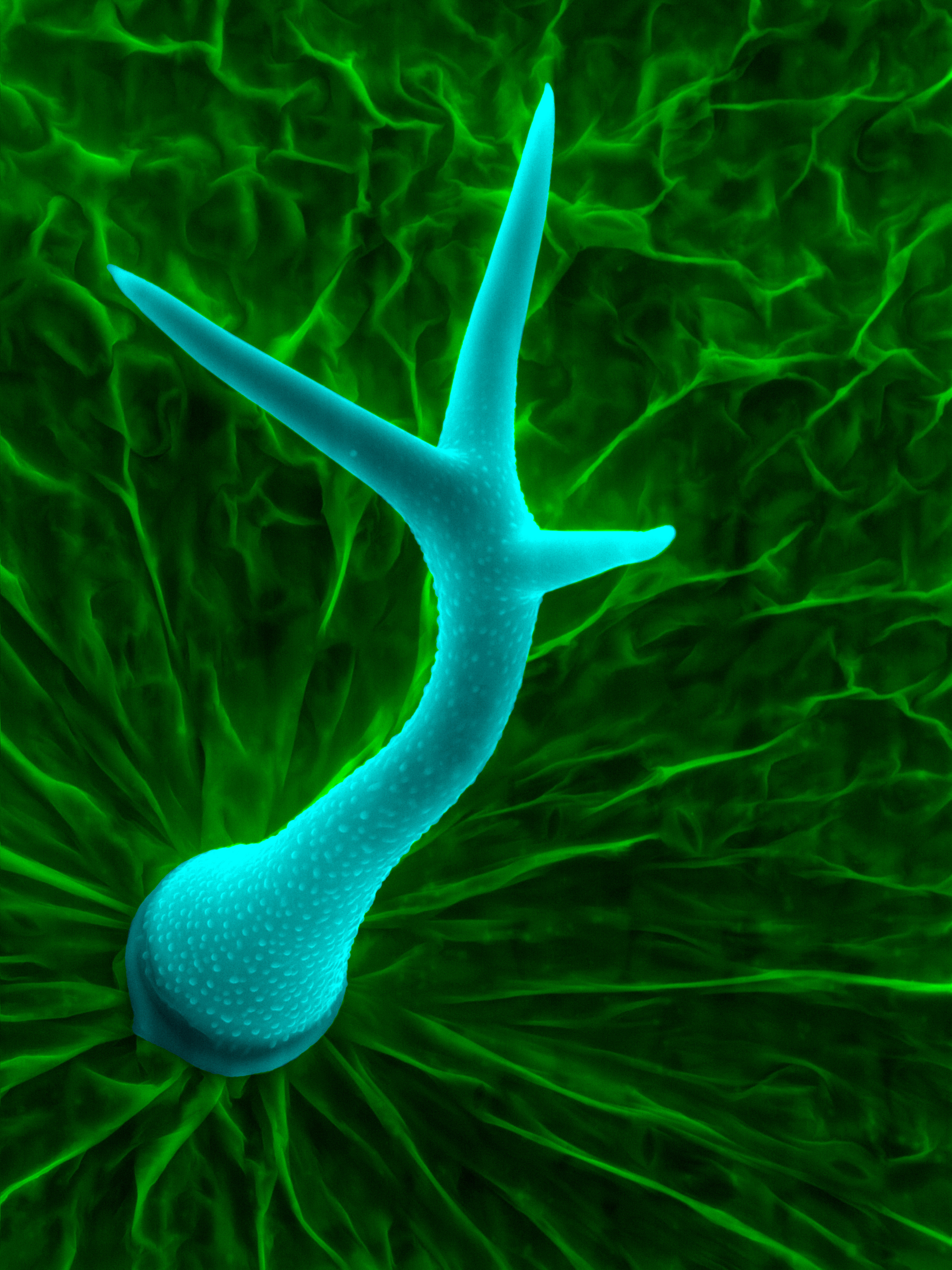
Scanning electron micrograph of a trichome

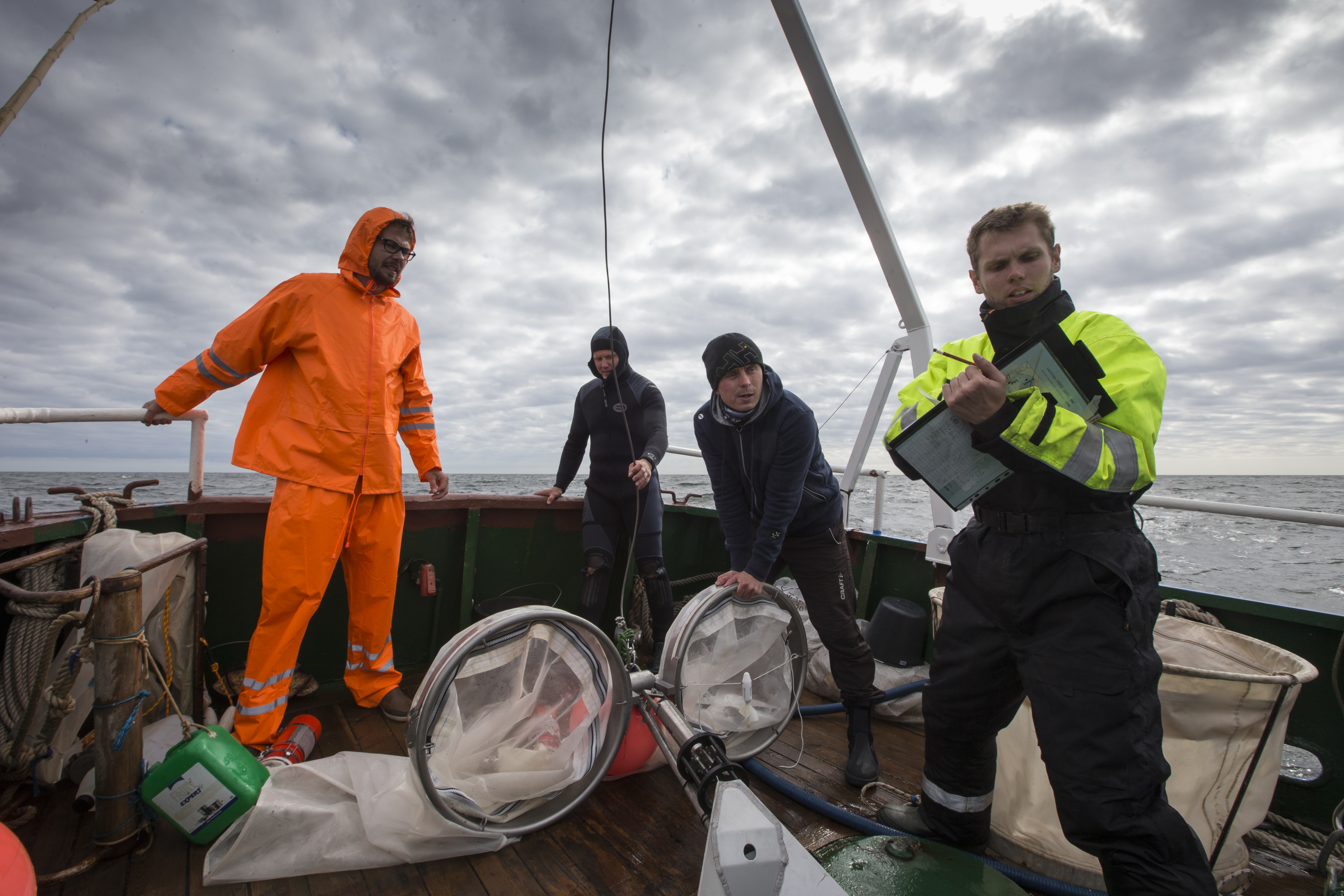
Making the last preparations to launch a new controllable monitoring seine

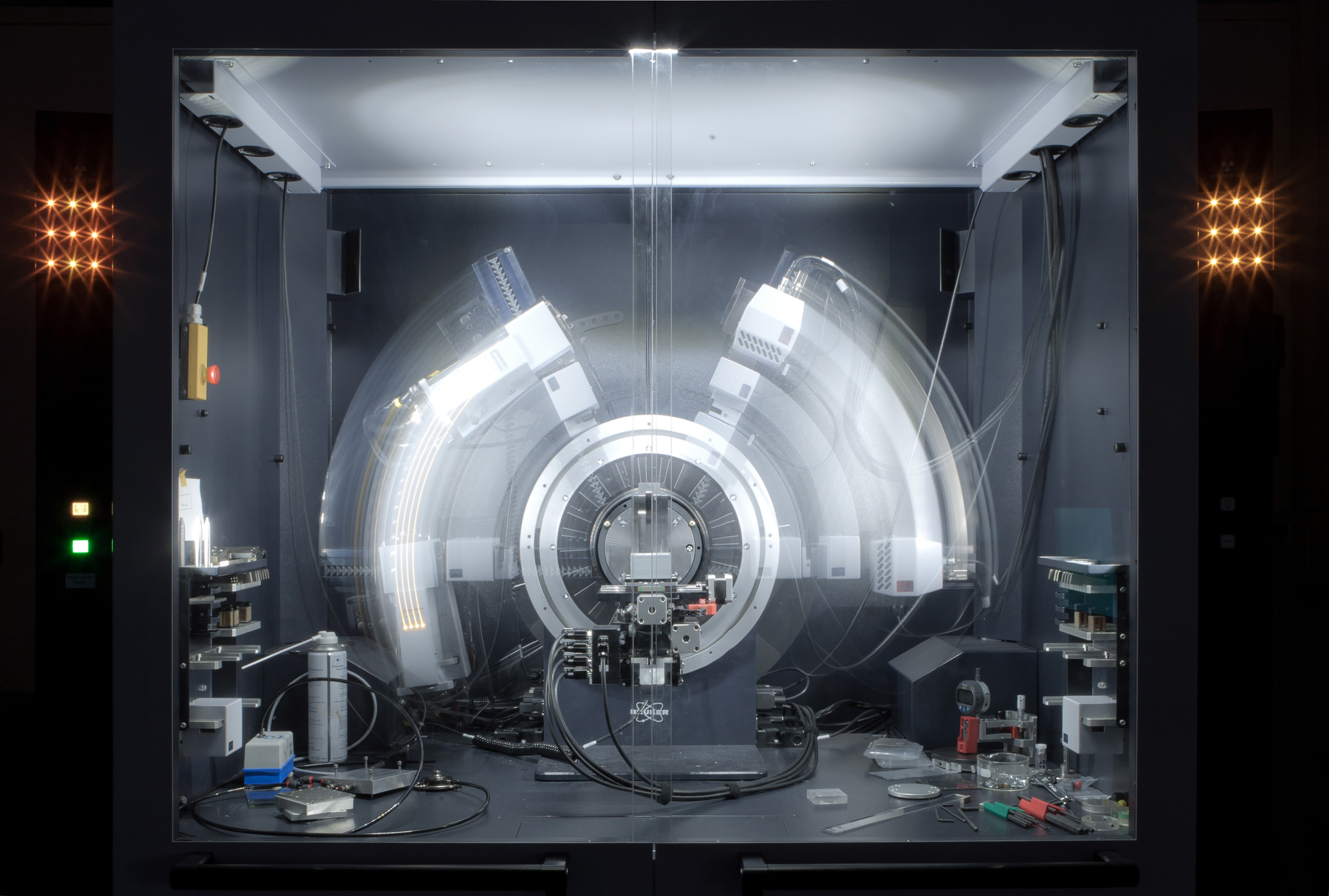
X-ray crystallography

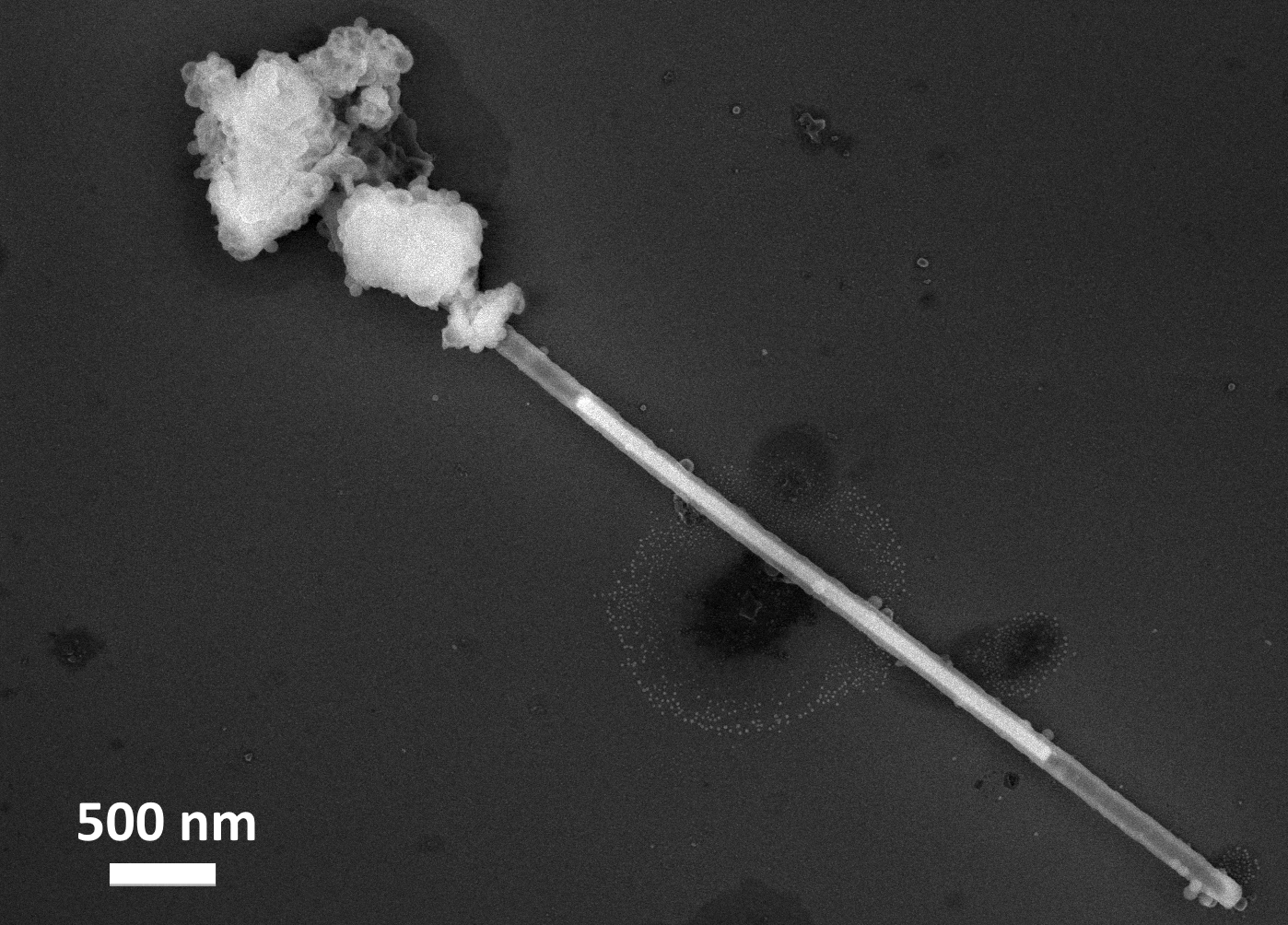
Coated silver nanowire under extreme conditions
