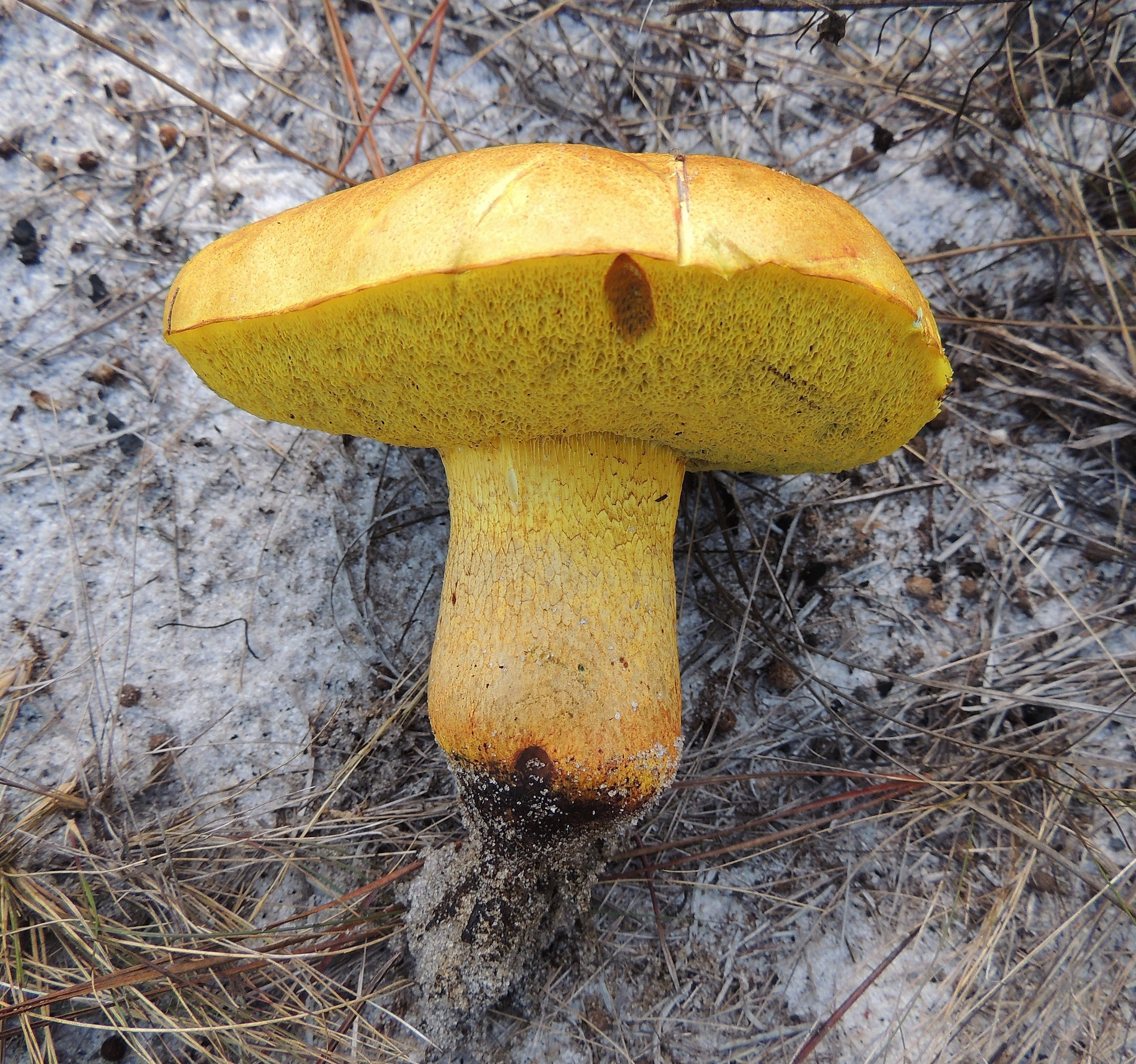
- Alessioporus rubriflavus

Scientific classification
- Kingdom: Fungi
- Division: Basidiomycota
- Class: Agaricomycetes
- Order: Boletales
- Family: Boletaceae
- Genus: Alessioporus; Gelardi, Vizzini & Simonini (2014)

Type species
- Alessioporus ichnusanus (Alessio, Galli, & Littini) Gelardi, Vizzini, & Simonini (2014)

Species
- Alessioporus ichnusanus (Alessio, Galli, & Littini) Gelardi, Vizzini, & Simonini (2014); Alessioporus rubriflavus J.L. Frank, A.R. Bessette & Bessette (2017)

= Alessioporus =

Genus of fungi

Alessioporus is a fungal genus in the family Boletaceae. It was circumscribed in 2014 to contain the species formerly known as Xerocomus ichnusanus. Alessioporus ichnusanus is found in southern Europe, where it grows in association with oak species and less often Cistus species. It grows even less frequently with Castanea sativa and possibly with Eucalyptus camaldulensis and Pteridium aquilinum.

This genus contains two recognized species:

- Alessioporus ichnusanus
- Alessioporus rubriflavus
