= Matteo Gelardi (cytologist) =

Italian rhinologist

- Matteo Gelardi
- Born: October 5, 1957 (age 69); Bari, Italy
- Citizenship: Italian
- Education: University of Bari
- Known for: Nasal cytology research
- Scientific career
- Fields: Otolaryngology, Rhinology, Nasal cytology
- Workplaces: University of Foggia; Policlinico di Bari

Matteo Gelardi is an Italian rhinologist and cytologist; he currently directs the School of Specialization in Otolaryngology at the University of Foggia.

== Early life and education ==
Matteo Gelardi was born in Bari on October 5, 1957 and graduated in Medicine and Surgery from the University of Bari in 1983. In 1987 he obtained the Diploma of Specialization in Otolaryngology from the University of Bari.

== Career ==
Gelardi worked at Policlinic hospital of Bari, where he was the head of the rhinologist center. He has conducted research in the field of rhino-allergology, focusing on defense mechanisms and cytological variations during inflammation of the upper airways.

In January 2009 he founded the Italian Academy of Nasal Cytology (AICNA), of which he was the president from 2010 to 2015. and he was also president of IAR (Italian Academy of Rhinology, Accademia di citologia). In 2017 he also launched the Accademia del mare in Bari with the goal of teaching proper raw fish preparation and consumption.

Since autumn 2019 Gelardi has held the position of Associate Professor of Otolaryngology at the University of Foggia.

In February 2026, Gelardi co-authored an expert-based Delphi consensus on the standardization of nasal cytology, published in *Current Allergy and Asthma Reports*. The study involved 100 members of the Italian Academy of Nasal Cytology (AICNA) and established standardized methodological and interpretative criteria for the diagnostic technique.

Gelardi has collaborated on more than 190 scientific studies published in important international journals and is the author of the first Atlas of Nasal Cytology, translated into English.

=== Outreach activity ===
Gelardi has promoted the concept that rhythm and music can have healing effects on the body. In 2018 with his work on the topic he also won the national Wiki Science Competition award in Pisa. The same year, Gelardi brought his show "Art & Science, from Microcosm to Macrocosm" to the Grand Hotel Costa Brada in Gallipoli. The show explored connections between art and science.

In 2019 he received an award recognizing his accomplishments and presented ""Art & Science" at Teatro Petruzzelli

In 2020, Gelardi continued to present his "Art & Science" show.

In 2021, Gelardi's Art & Science project was incorporated into the University of Foggia's academic curriculum as an elective course worth six university credits, following a proposal by Gelardi approved by the Department of Humanities.

In 2024 he was President of the international Jury of the Wiki Science Competition contest. In May 2026, Gelardi presided over the Italian jury of the 2025 edition of the same competition.

== Selected publications ==
- Gelardi, Matteo (2012). Atlas of nasal cytology for the differential diagnosis of nasal diseases. English translation by John F. Pallanch. Milan: Edi-Ermes. SBN IT\ICCU\FOG\0574737.
- Gelardi, Matteo (2021). Art & Science. Quando la scienza diventa arte [Art & Science: When Science Becomes Art] (in Italian). Foreword by Philippe Daverio. Corato: Secop. ISBN 9791280554024.
- Gelardi, Matteo, ed. (2023). Art & Science: i dialoghi (in Italian). Corato: Secop.
- Gelardi, Matteo (2026). Evidenze terapeutiche nelle infezioni ricorrenti delle vie respiratorie: il ruolo degli immunomodulanti (in Italian). Turin: Minerva Medica.
