= Maxim Bilovitskiy =

Estonian YouTuber and scientific photographer

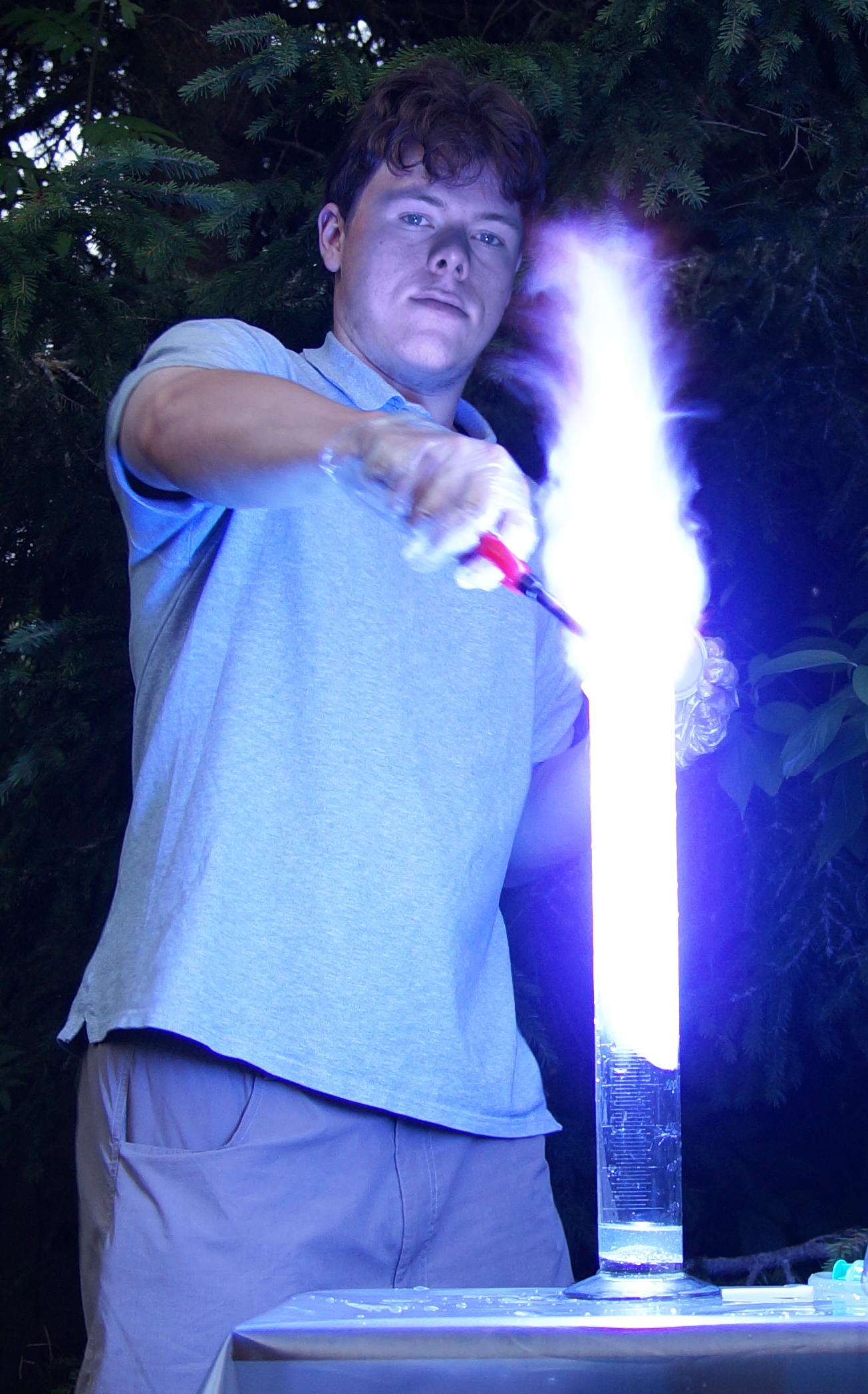
- Maxim Bilovitskiy in 2014
- Born: 8 November 1992 (age 33); Maardu, Estonia
- Occupations: scientist, chemist, writer, photographer
- Awards: Estonian Science Communication Award

Academic background
- Education: Tallinn University of Technology

Maxim Bilovitskiy (born in Maardu, Estonia, on 8 November 1992) is an Estonian food scientist, chemist, writer, photographer and YouTuber, Russian-language.

In 2011, he created the Russian YouTube channel "Thoisoi" in Russian. As of December 2022 his channel has amassed over 288 million views and over 1.9 million subscribers. His hobby is popularizing science and creating educational videos. In 2014, he created a second channel for his English-speaking followers. That channel has over 930,000 subscribers and has more than 110 million views.

In 2014, he graduated from Tallinn University of Technology of Chemical and Materials Technology with an undergraduate degree in the Faculty of Food Technology and Product Development. In 2016, he earned his master's degree at the same university.

In 2015, his video of superconductor properties won in the Estonian science photo competition in the category of "other media files," his other photograph of lactose crystals was the second-place winner of the "microscope photographs." His YBCO superconductor video went on to win the European Science Photo Competition in the non-photographic media category.

He won the Wiki Science Competition 2017 in the category of non-photographic media with a video of a frozen drop of water in a frigid environment. In the Wiki Science Competition 2019, his video of the growth of silver crystals on the surface of copper from a solution of silver nitrate was listed among runners-up in the same category, and in 2021, his video of the Wilson cloud chamber won the non-photographic media category.

In 2021 he was nominated for the Estonian Science Communication Award as the best communicator of science and technology.

He has authored 3 books in chemistry published in Russia.
