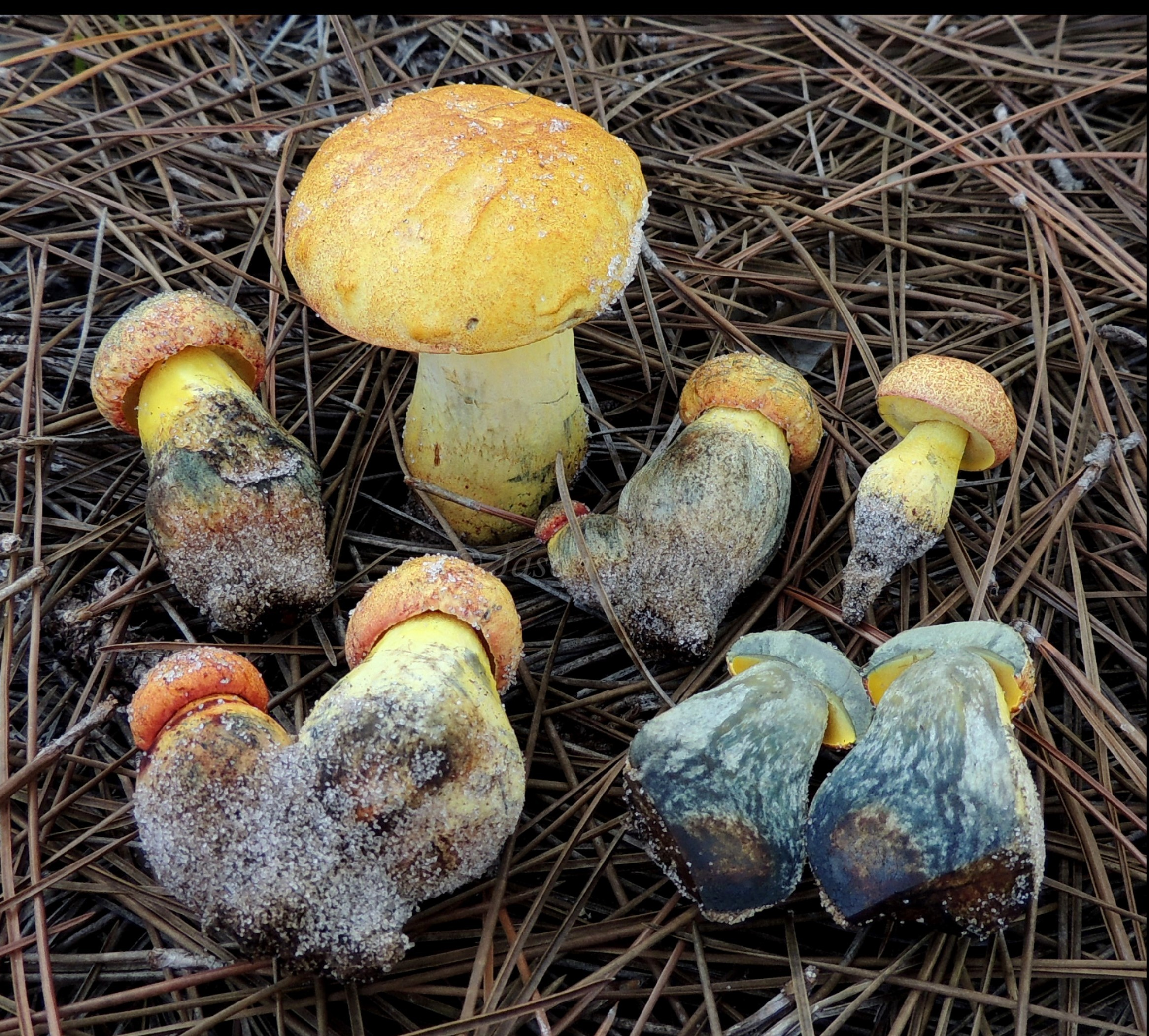

Scientific classification
- Domain: Eukaryota
- Kingdom: Fungi
- Division: Basidiomycota
- Class: Agaricomycetes
- Order: Boletales
- Family: Boletaceae
- Genus: Alessioporus
- Species: A. rubriflavus

Binomial name
- Alessioporus rubriflavus J.L. Frank, A.R. Bessette & Bessette

= Alessioporus rubriflavus =

Species of fungus

Alessioporus rubriflavus is a species of fungus in the family Boletaceae. It was described in 2017 as the first North American member of the genus Alessioporus.

== Description ==
The cap is red when young, becoming somewhat yellow with age, the pores are yellow, and the stem is yellow with red streaks. All parts stain blue when bruised. The taste is distinctively sour or acidic.

== Range ==
The type locality is Elbert County, Georgia, and the species is known to range along the Atlantic seaboard from Florida at least to New York.

== Habitat ==
This species is known from oak/pine woods, scrub, and sandy soil.

== Etymology ==
The specific epithet is derived from Latin ruber, red, and flavus, yellow, referring to the colors of the fruiting body.

== Taxonomy ==
As of 2024, the only other member of the genus is a European species: Alessioporus ichnusanus.
