= Wiki Science Competition =

International scientific photo competition

- Official logo of Wiki Science Competition

- Genre: Scientific photography, Nature photography, Scientific illustration
- Begins: 1-15 November
- Ends: 1-15 December
- Location: Worldwide
- Years active: 6
- Inaugurated: 2017
- Most recent: 2023
- Participants: Photographers, researchers, students
- Organiser: Wikipedia community members
- Website: wikisciencecompetition.org

The Wiki Science Competition (WSC) is a global science photography competition for students, researchers, and others to contribute freely licensed high-quality, well-sourced images and other media to Wikimedia Commons. The main organizer of the competition is Ivo Kruusamägi.

== History ==
It evolved from the Estonian Science Photo Competition. The first global competition took place in 2017 and is now held every two years, occurring for most countries around November or December. It has been called one of the most important photo competitions in the world.

== Participating countries ==
The first competition saw participation from over 2,200 contestants, with the number of images exceeding 10,000. In 2023 there were more than 7,500 photos submitted. Among the countries where it has been launched and regularly held there are Estonia, Switzerland, Ireland, United States, Poland, Ukraine, and Russia (where it is held in Spring).

== Evaluation ==
In 2017, there were five categories: People in Science, Microscopy images, Non-photographic media, Image sets, and a General category. In 2019, a new category, Nature, was added; in 2021, Astronomy was added. A special prize for "Women in STEM" is also offered.

Media are evaluated based on the detail of their description, with sources from high-impact journals, datasets, and other reliable third-parties being prioritized. This incentivizes expert-driven contributions backed by verifiable materials.

== Winners ==
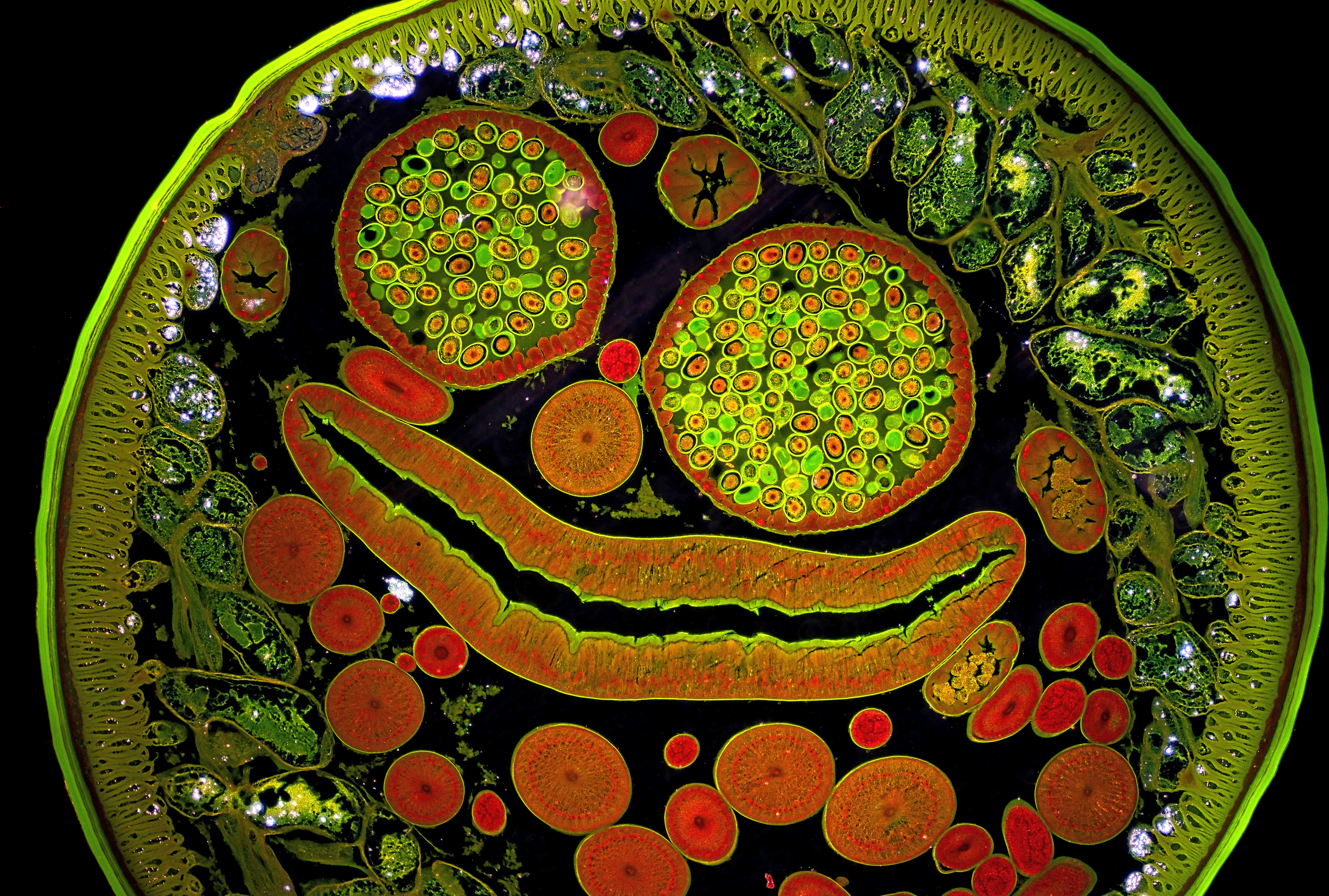
Cross-section of the parasite Ascaris under 200x magnification. Winner of the Microscopy images category 2017, Massimo Brizzi, Italy

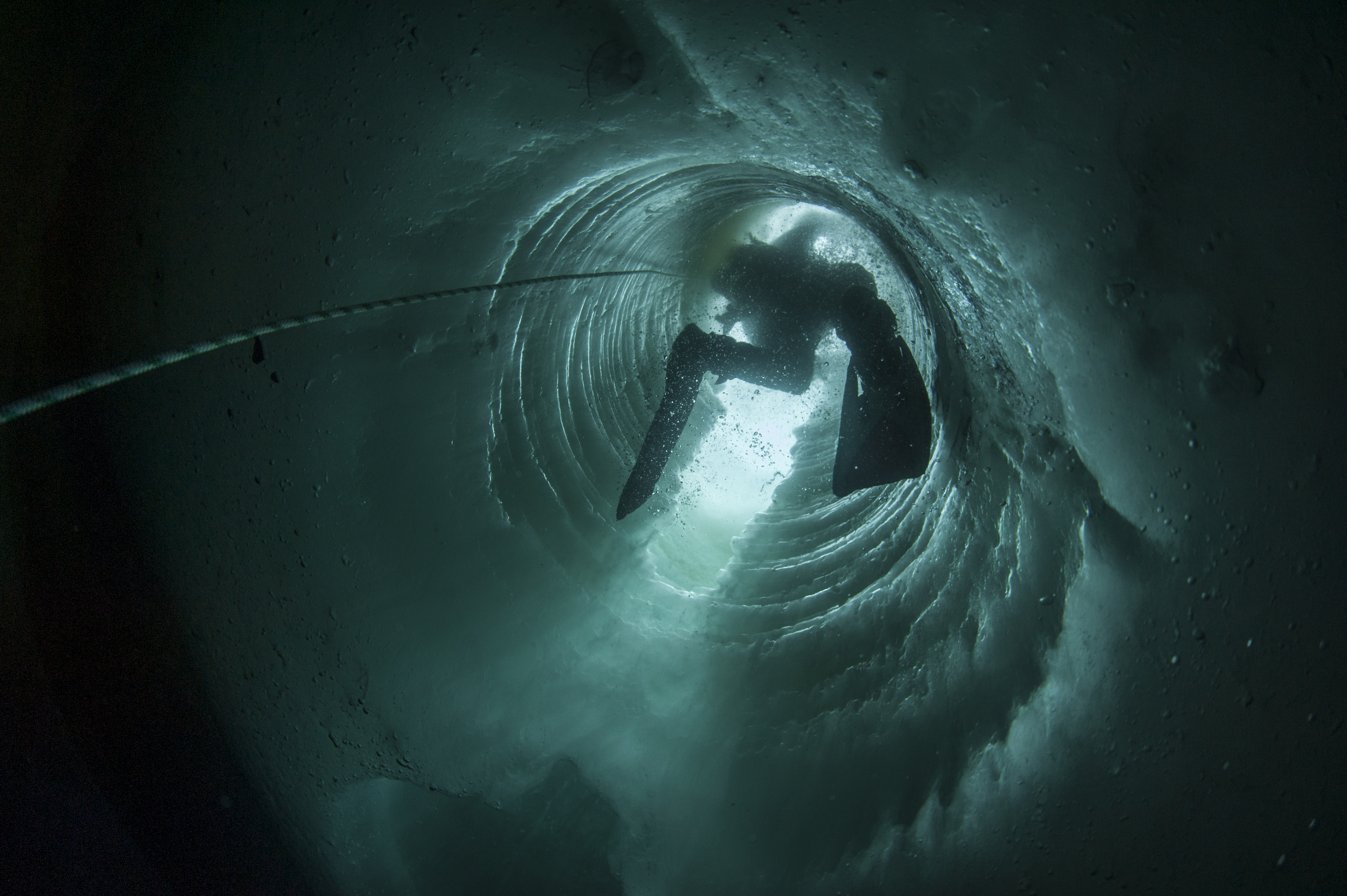
A polar diver going through ice near the French Antarctica station. Winner of the People in Science category 2017, Erwan Amice, France

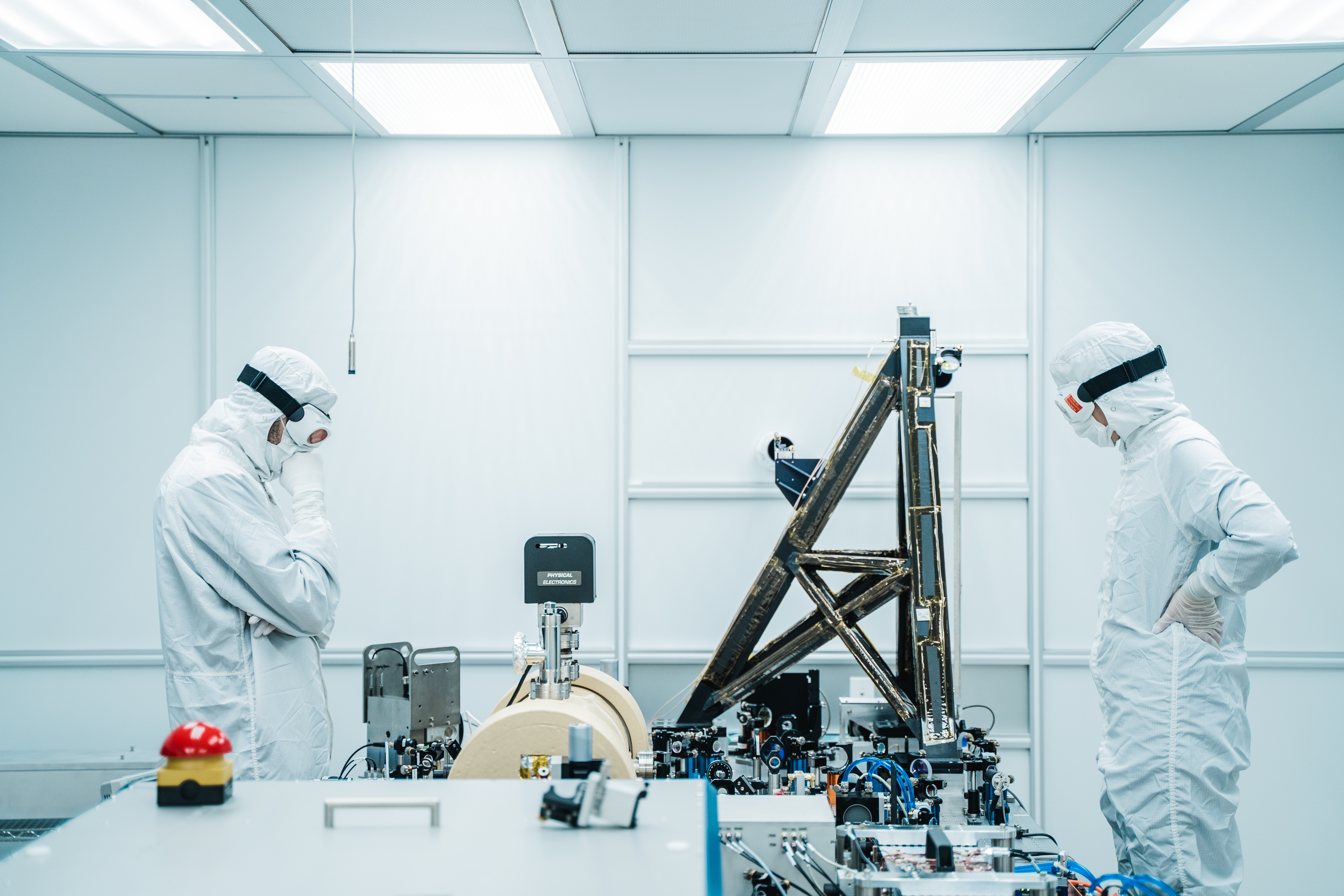
Two LIGO scientists trying to detect what is causing laser technical issues. Winner of the People in Science category 2019, Nutsinee Kijbunchoo, USA/Thailand

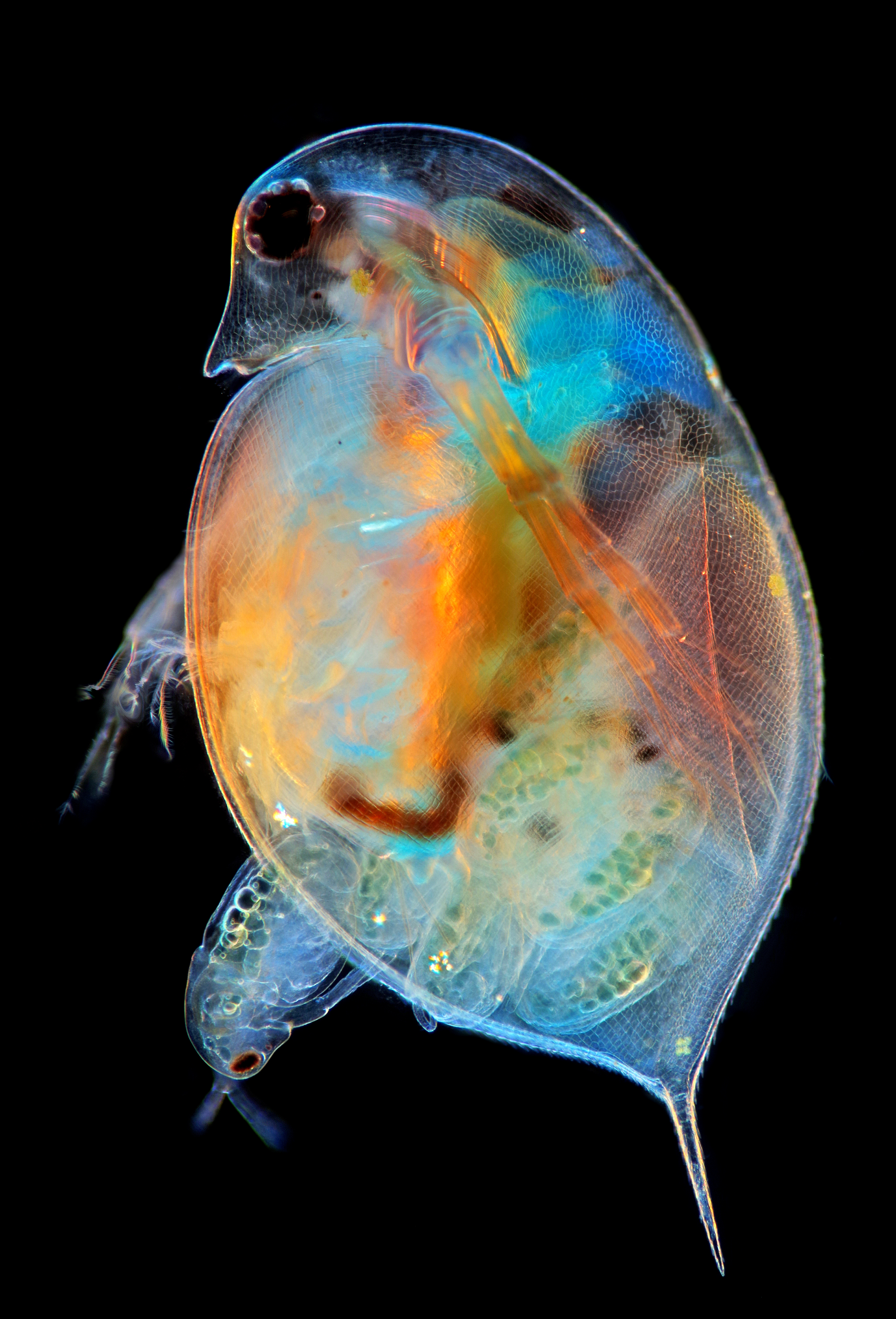
A birthing water flea under 100x magnification and polarized light. Winner of the Microscopy images category 2019, Marek Miś, Poland

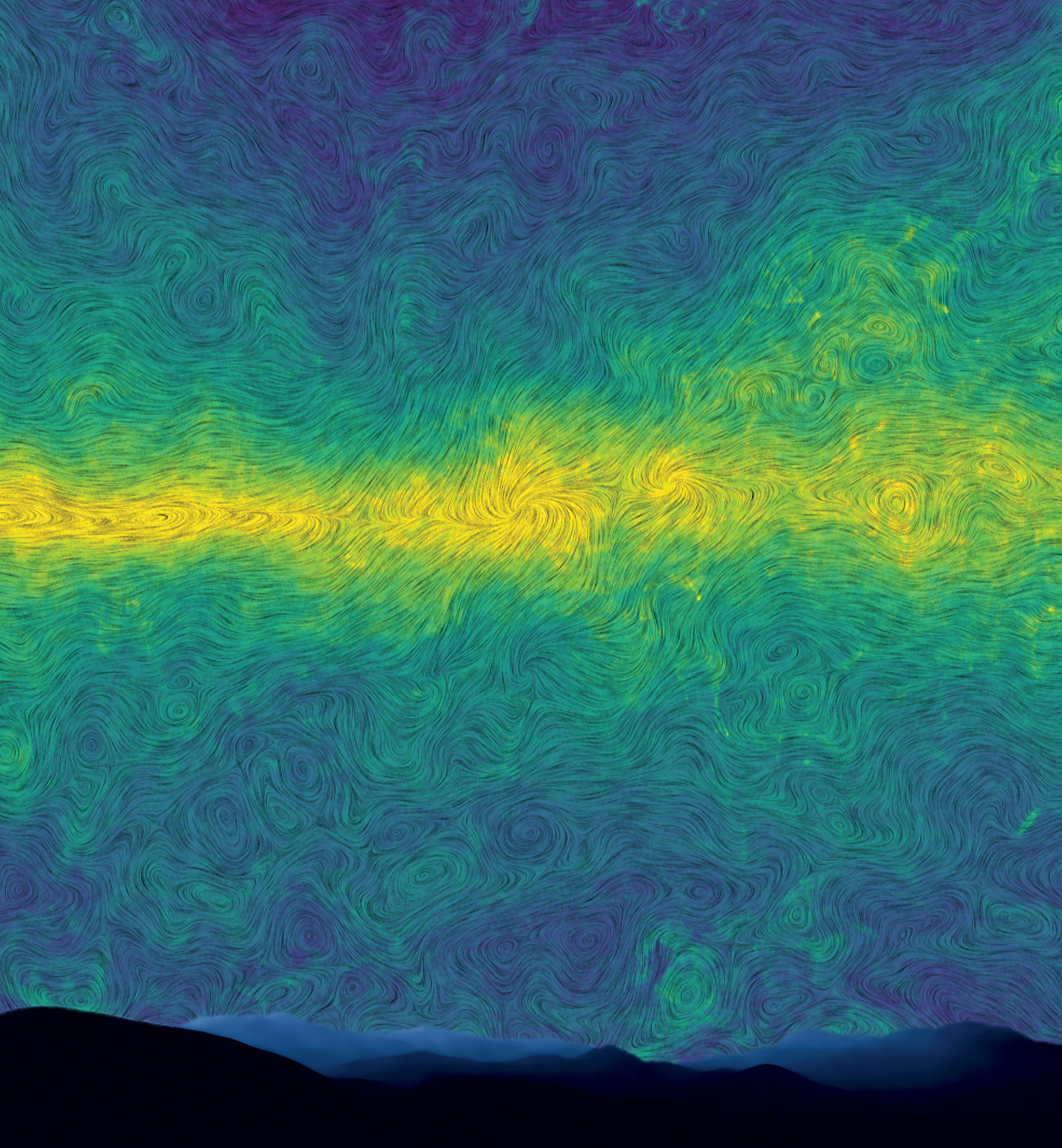
The simulated polarization of the Milky Way's dust as microwave radiation in the sky. Winner of the Non-photographic media category 2019, Uroš Seljak

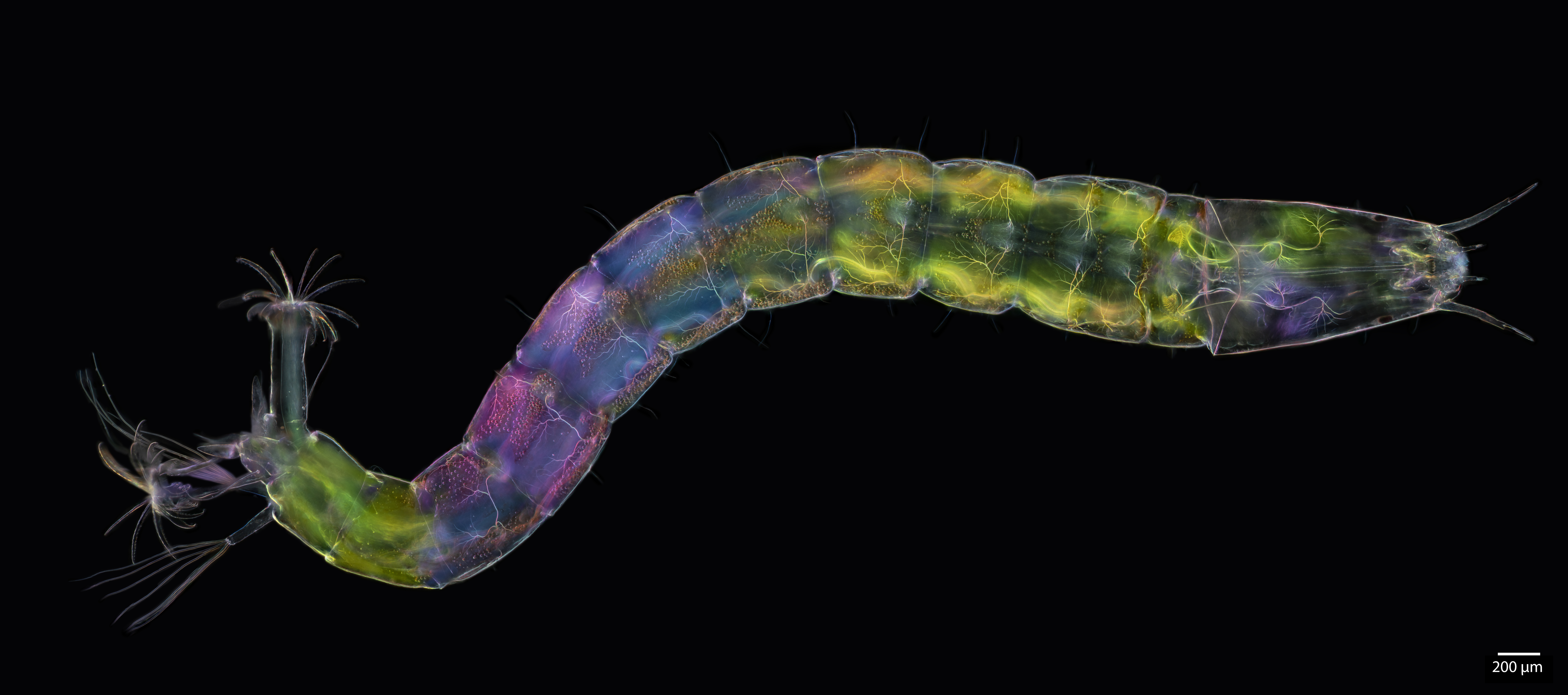
A larva of a non-biting midge under polarized light. Winner of the Microscopy images category 2021, Karl Gaff, Ireland

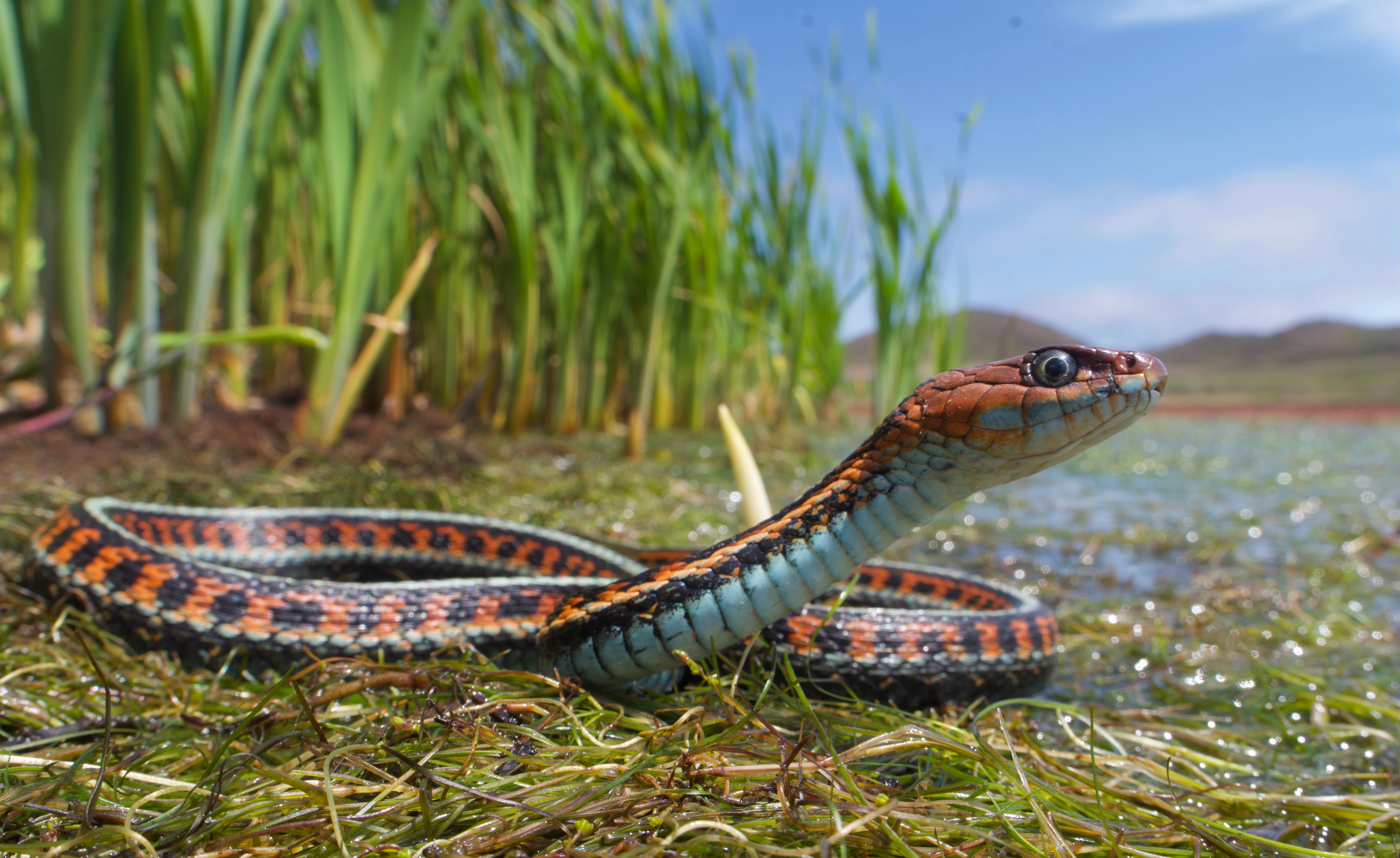
A California red-sided garter snake in its natural habitat. Winner of the Nature category 2021, Jaden Clark, USA

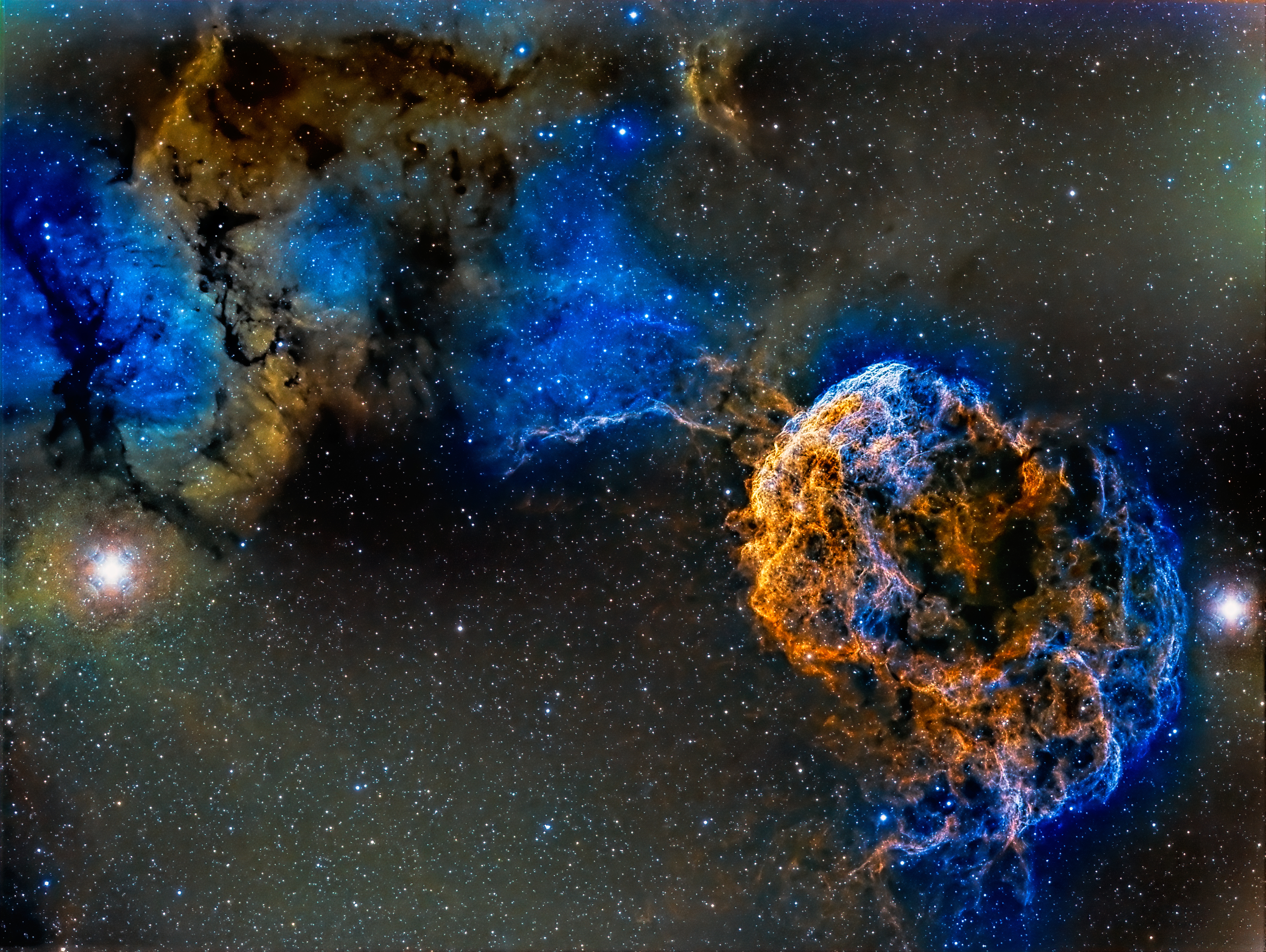
The supernova remnant Jellyfish Nebula (IC443) and its surroundings. Winner of the Astronomy category 2021, Ram Samudrala, USA

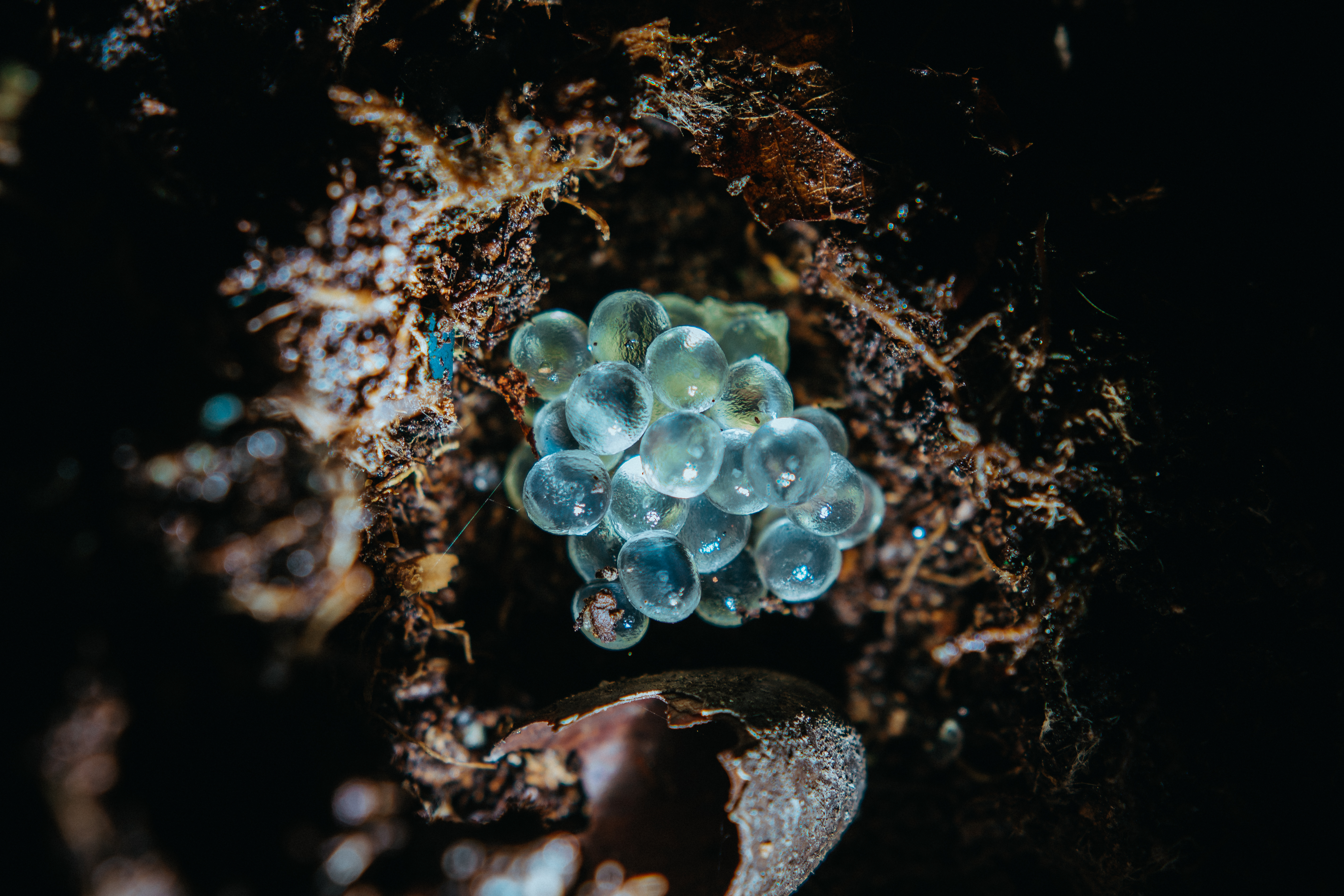
Macrophotography of the eggs of a fire salamander taken a few days after laying. Winner of the Wildlife and Nature category 2023, Pablo Jimenez Velayos, Spain

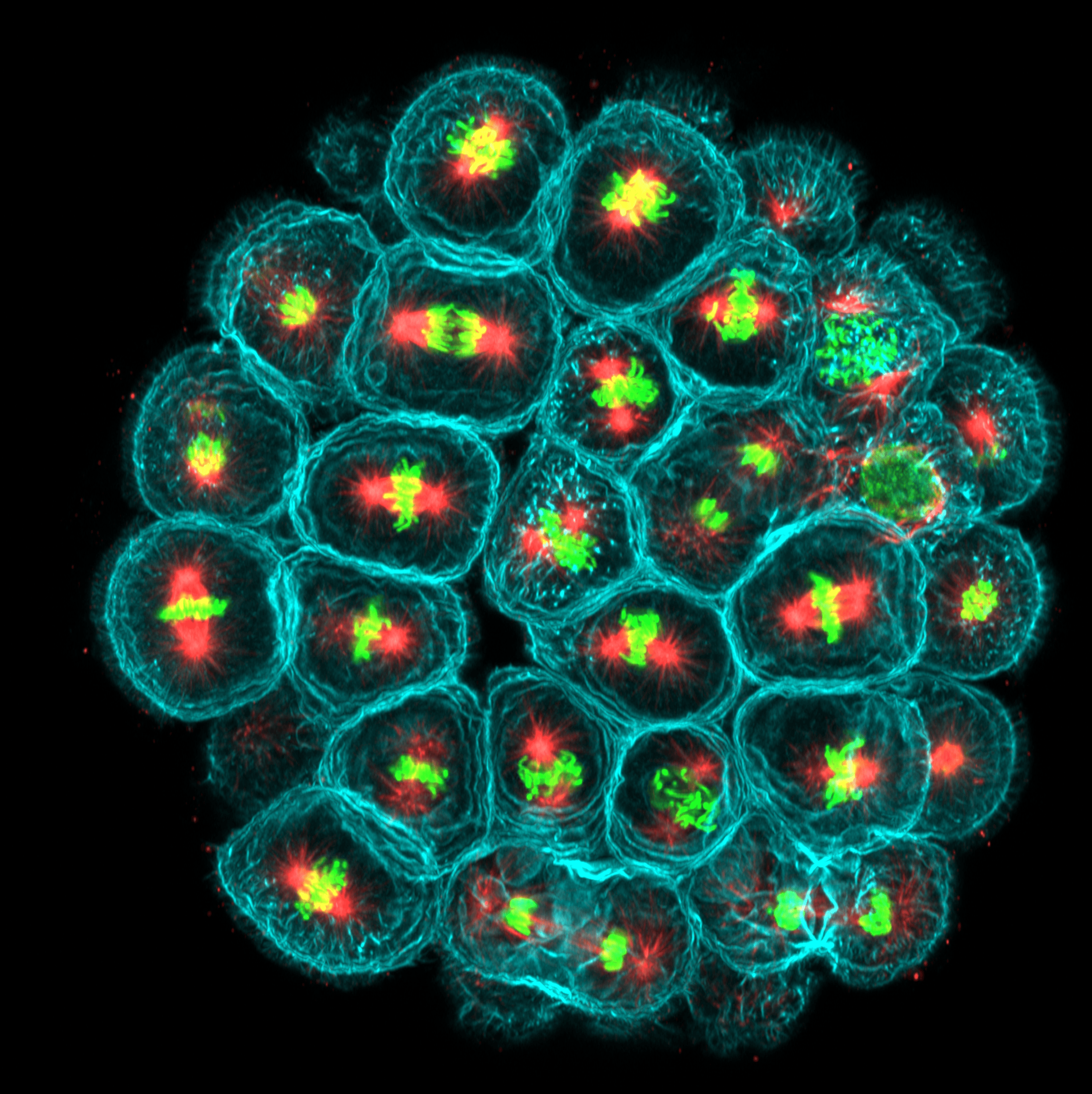
Blastula-stage sea urchin embryo. Winner of the Microscopy images category 2023, Aude Nommick, France

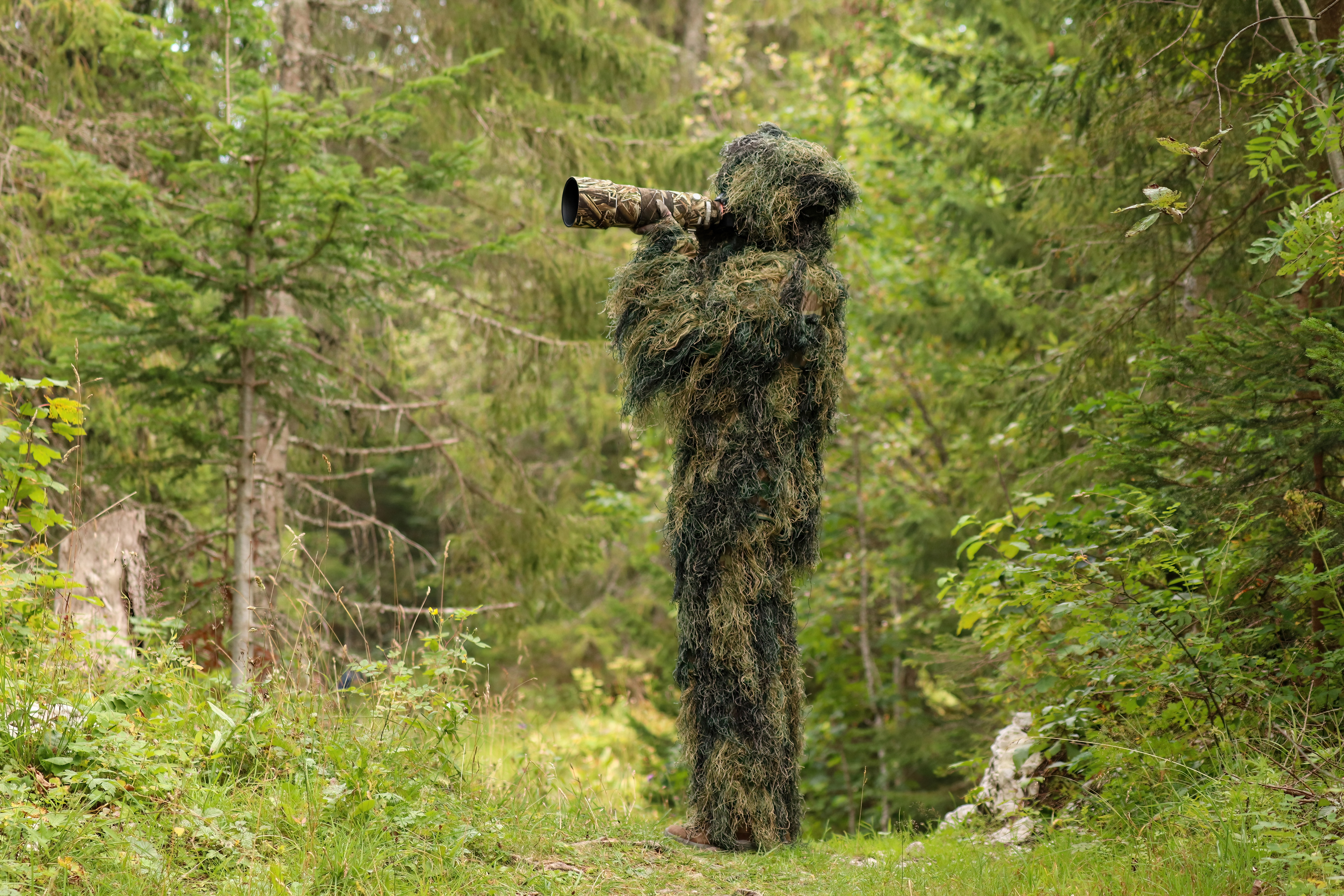
Wildlife photographer wearing a ghillie suit. Winner of the People in Science category 2023, Giles Laurent, Switzerland

== See also ==
- Wiki Loves Monuments
- Wiki Loves Earth
