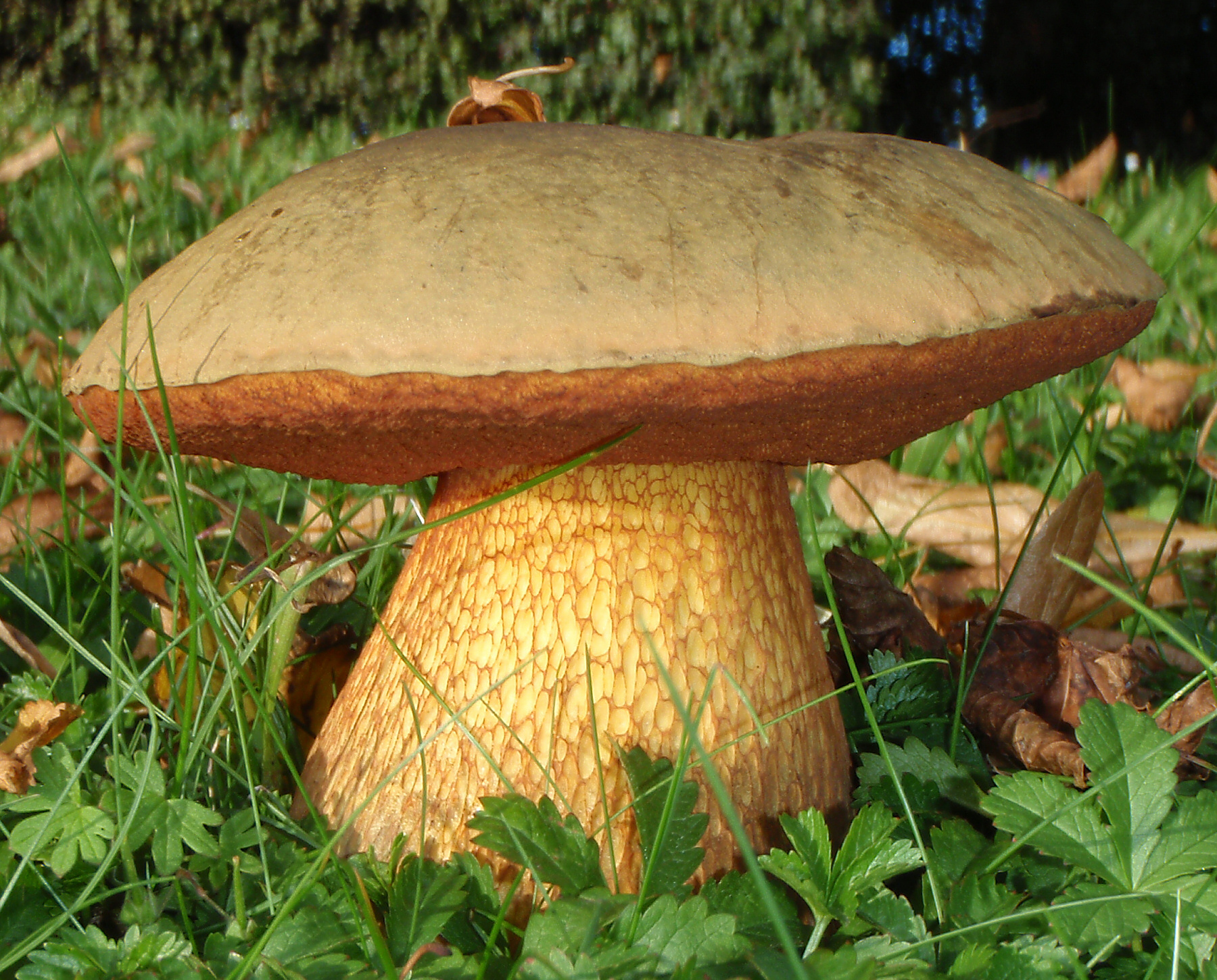

Scientific classification
- Kingdom: Fungi
- Division: Basidiomycota
- Class: Agaricomycetes
- Order: Boletales
- Family: Boletaceae
- Genus: Suillellus
- Species: S. luridus

Binomial name
- Suillellus luridus (Schaeff.) Murrill (1909)

Synonyms
- Boletus luridus Schaeff. (1774); Boletus rubeolarius Bull. (1791); Boletus subvescus J.F.Gmel. (1792); Leccinum luridum (Schaeff.) Gray (1821); Tubiporus luridus (Schaeff.) P.Karst. (1881); Dictyopus luridus (Schaeff.) Quél. (1888)

= Suillellus luridus =

Species of edible fungus of the bolete family

Suillellus luridus
- Mycological characteristics
- Pores on hymenium
- Cap is convex
- Hymenium is adnate
- Stipe is bare
- Spore print is olive-brown
- Ecology is mycorrhizal
- Edibility is edible but not recommended

Suillellus luridus (formerly Boletus luridus), commonly known as the lurid bolete, is a fungus of the family Boletaceae, found in calcareous broadleaved woodlands in Europe. Fruit bodies appear in summer and autumn and may be locally abundant. It is a firm bolete with an olive-brown cap up to 20 cm (8 in) in diameter, with small orange or red pores on the underside (yellow when young). The stout ochre stem reaches 8–14 cm (3–6 in) high and 1–3 cm (0.4–1.2 in) wide, and is patterned with a red network. Like several other red-pored boletes, it stains blue when bruised or cut.

While edible and good when cooked, it can cause gastric upset when eaten raw and can be confused with the poisonous Boletus satanas; as a result, some guidebooks recommend avoiding consumption altogether. When consumed with alcohol, Suillellus luridus has been implicated in causing adverse reactions similar to those caused by the compound coprine, though laboratory testing has not revealed any evidence of coprine in the mushroom.

First described in 1774, the species has been transferred to various Boletaceae genera in its taxonomic history, although it retained the original name given to it by German botanist Jacob Christian Schaeffer until a transfer to genus Suillellus in 2014. Several varieties, a subspecies, and a form have been described by European mycologists. Suillellus luridus is mycorrhizal, forming a symbiotic association with broad-leaved trees trees as oak, chestnut, birch and beech, and has been found to have a growth-enhancing effect on conifers in experiments. The fruit bodies are highly attractive to, and often infested by, insects, and several species of fly have been recorded feeding on them. Chemical analyses have revealed some aspects of the mushroom's components, including its volatile flavour compounds, its fatty acid and amino acid compositions, and the identities of the carotenoid compounds responsible for its colour.

== Taxonomy and phylogeny ==
Boletus luridus was described by German botanist Jacob Christian Schäffer in 1774, in his series on fungi of Bavaria and the Palatinate, Fungorum qui in Bavaria et Palatinatu circa Ratisbonam nascuntur icones. The specific epithet is the Latin adjective luridus, 'sallow'. French botanist Pierre Bulliard's 1791 Boletus rubeolarius is a heterotypic synonym (based on a different type). The following year, Johann Friedrich Gmelin called it Boletus subvescus, from the Latin words sub "nearly" or "under", and vescus "edible". However, this is a nomen nudum. Several taxonomical synonyms arose when the species was transferred to different genera within the family Boletaceae by different authorities, including Leccinum by Samuel Frederick Gray in 1821, Tubiporus by Petter Karsten in 1881, Dictyopus by Lucien Quélet in 1888, and Suillellus by William Murrill in 1909.

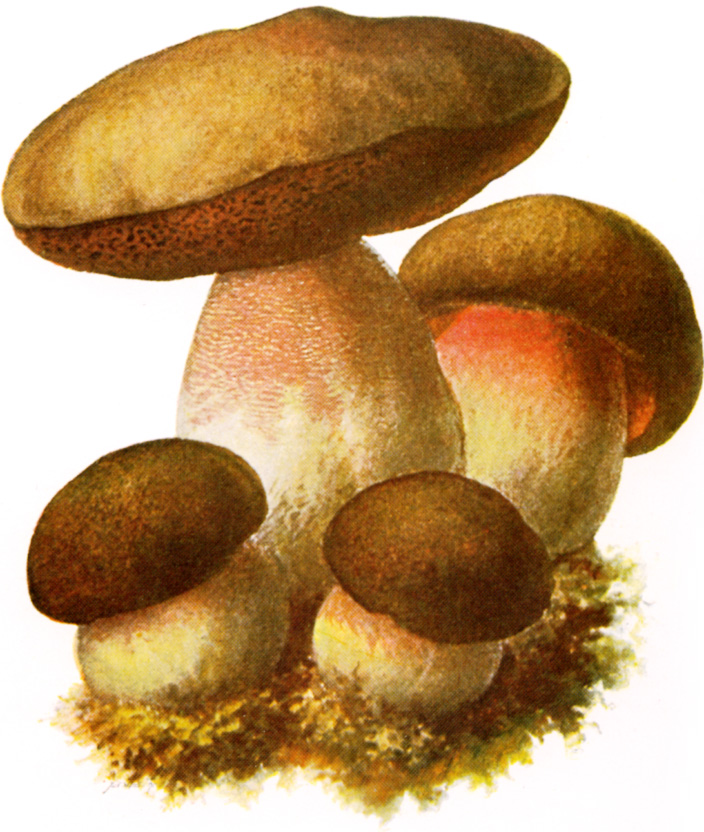
1897 illustration by Albin Schmalfuß

The variety Boletus luridus var. erythropus, published as "beta" by Elias Magnus Fries in his 1821 Systema Mycologicum, is synonymous with Boletus erythropus. Boletus luridus var. rubriceps was originally described from Spain (as a species of Tubiporus) by René Maire in 1937, and later formally transferred to Boletus by Aurel Dermek in 1987. Other varieties of B. luridus include Roman Schulz's var. obscurus and var. rubromaculatus published in 1924; Josef Velenovský's 1939 var. tenuipes, found in the Czech Republic; and Jean Blum's 1969 var. lupiniformis and var. queletiformis, originally described from France and Spain, respectively. Boletus erythrentheron, originally described as a distinct species by Jan Bezděk, was later recombined as the variety B. luridus var. erythrentheron by Albert Pilát and Dermek in 1979, and finally as a subspecies by Jiri Hlavácek in 1995. Carmine Lavorato and Giampaolo Simonini defined the form primulicolor from Sardinia in 1997. Rolf Singer's 1947 variety caucasicus, later recombined as an independent species, Boletus caucasicus Singer ex. Alessio, has never been validly published and is a nomen nudum. Boletus luridus f. sinensis, found in Hainan Province, China, was later elevated to species status and transferred to another genus with the name Neoboletus sinensis.

Boletus luridus was the type species of Boletus section Luridi, originally circumscribed by Fries in 1838. This section traditionally included species producing medium to large fruit bodies with thick, swollen stems, and minute pores that are coloured red, orange, or rarely yellow. However, early phylogenetic investigations indicated that Boletus is strongly paraphyletic in its traditional delimitation. As further studies have resolved phylogenetic and taxonomical relationships to a finer detail, Boletus has been fragmented and additional genera were recognised. Molecular phylogenetics inferred from ribosomal DNA sequences by Manfred Binder and David Hibbett, showed B. luridus to be related to a group containing B. torosus and B. luteocupreus (now placed in genus Imperator), with B. vermiculosus and Pulveroboletus ravenelii as more distant relatives. In a separate molecular study by Mello and colleagues, B. luridus clustered together with B. rhodoxanthus, while further genetic analyses in 2013 indicated that B. luridus and some red-pored boletes are part of a dupainii clade (named after Boletus dupainii), quite distant from the core group of Boletus edulis and its relatives. However, more refined analyses based on a larger number of sequences, have since demonstrated that B. luridus and its allied species form a distinct generic clade, and since 2014 the fungus has been placed in genus Suillellus.

=== Common names ===
The English common name is lurid bolete. Both S. luridus and Boletus satanas are known as ayimantari (meaning "bear mushroom"), in Eastern Turkey.

== Description ==
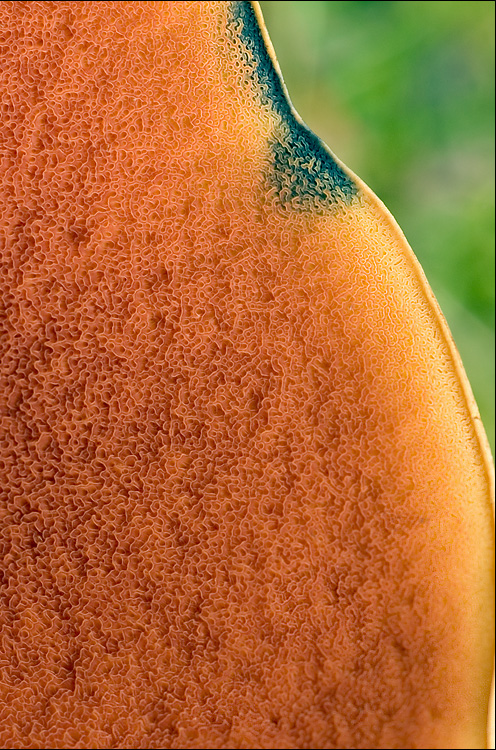
Closeup of the pore surface. Note the yellow region around the margin and the blue discolouration where the cap has been handled.

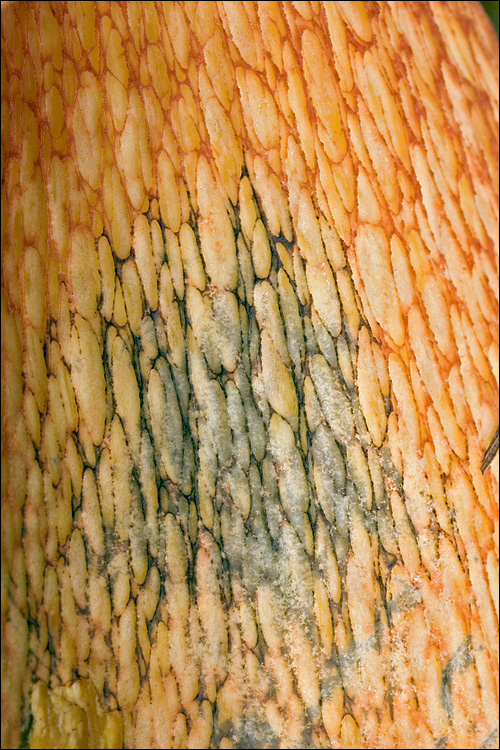
The stem has orange-red reticulation over a yellowish background and bruises blue.

Suillellus luridus is a stout fungus with a thick yellow-olive to olive-brown convex cushion-shaped cap that can reach 20 cm (8 in) in diameter. The cap colour tends to darken with age, and regions of red, orange, purple, brown, or olive-green can often be present. The cap surface is finely tomentose (velvety) at first, becoming smoother with old age, and viscid in wet weather. The pore surface is initially yellowish-orange or orange, before turning orange-red to sometimes red and stains strongly blue when injured or handled. The pore surface usually has a lighter-coloured zone encircling the margin, as the pores tend to darken from their point of attachment to the stem outwards. There are 2–3 rounded pores per millimetre, and the tubes are 1–2 cm (0.4–0.8 in) long. The tubes are shorter around the cap margin and close to the stem, where they form a circular depression. Initially pale yellow, the tubes gradually become olive-yellow and stain bluish-green upon exposure to air. A frequent feature is the presence of a maroon layer between the tubes and the flesh (known as Bataille’s line), but this is not always present and subhymenial flesh can occasionally be yellow or straw-coloured. The stem is 8–14 cm (3–6 in) tall and 1–3 cm (0.4–1.2 in) wide, and bears a distinctive, elongated (or "stretched") orange-red reticulum (network) pattern on a paler yellowish, orange, or ochre background, often becoming darker and vinaceous towards the base. The flesh is yellowish, sometimes with red patches in the cap but almost always rhubarb to vinaceous-red towards the stem base, and stains an intense dark blue when bruised or cut. There is a faint sour smell, and the taste is described as mild. The mycelium is an unusual yellow colour.

Variety queletiformis can be distinguished from the main form by the reddish discolouration of the stem base that occurs both on the exterior surface and in the flesh. Variety rubriceps has a deep crimson red cap, while var. lupiniformis has a pale yellow or dirty ochre cap and pores, sometimes with pink tones throughout.

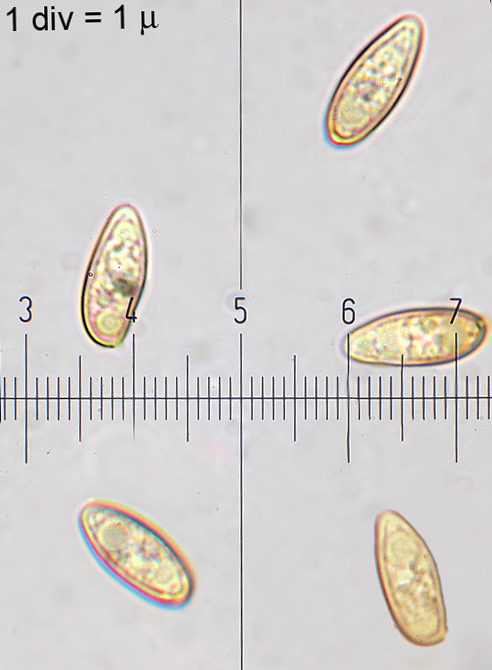
Spores

The spore print is olive to brownish olive. Under the microscope, the spores are elliptical to somewhat fusiform (spinde-shaped), measuring 11–15 μm long by 4.5–6.5 μm wide and have a median spore quotient of 2.2. The basidia (spore-bearing cells) are club-shaped and four-spored, and measure 29.2–36.5 by 11.0–12.4 μm. Cystidia on the sides of the tubes (pleurocystidia) are fuse-shaped with swollen middles and long necks, measuring 33–48 by 7.3–13.5 μm; cheilocystidia (on the edges of the pores) have a similar morphology. The cap cuticle is made of cylindrical hyphae 3.7–5.8 μm wide that are interwoven compactly, and the hyphal tips are erect and arranged in bundles. In contrast, the hyphae of the cap flesh is loosely interwoven with hyphae that are cylindrical and branched, measuring 3.7–8.8 μm. Hyphae do not contain clamp connections.

Some chemical tests can be used to help identify the mushroom. A drop of dilute potassium hydroxide placed on the cap cuticle will stain dark red to blackish, and orange-yellow on the flesh, while ferrous sulfate solution turns the cuticle yellow and then greenish-yellow. Melzer's reagent will turn the flesh dark blue, after the natural bluing reaction to injury has faded.

=== Similar species ===
Suillellus mendax, a species described from Italy in 2014 and subsequently confirmed in Cyprus and France, is very similar to S. luridus and found under the same host-trees. It produces more robust fruit bodies with a markedly tomentose cap, has a reticulum that is less pronounced and often restricted to the upper part of the stem, and is mostly found on acidic rather than calcareous soil. Microscopically, S. mendax has more elongated, narrowly fusiform (spinde-shaped) spores than S. luridus, measuring (12.4–)13.3–14.7(–15.5) × (4.5–)4.9– 5.5(–5.7) μm, and with a higher spore quotient of 2.7. Collections from southern Europe previously classified as Boletus caucasicus on the basis of a yellow subhymenial layer (the flesh in the cap tissue immediately above the tube layer known as Bataille’s line), have been shown to phylogenetically correspond to either S. luridus or S. mendax. As shown by Vizzini and colleagues, the name Boletus caucasicus has been invalidly published (nomen nudum) and the Bataille's line is not reliable for discriminating between species in the Luridi complex, as it can be randomly present or absent in both S. luridus and S. mendax.

Another similar species is Suillellus comptus, a Mediterranean bolete sharing a lot of features with S. luridus and S. queletii. This uncommon species is also found on chalky soil under oak, but generally produces more slender and dull-coloured fruit bodies, with a rudimentary, incomplete, or at times completely absent reticulation, rarely extending below the top (apex) of the stem. Under the microscope, S. comptus has very similar spores to S. luridus, but the hyphae of its cap cuticle are more loose and prostrate, running more or less parallel to the cap. Also in the same genus, Suillellus queletii shares with S. luridus a vinaceous stem base and strongly bluing flesh, but completely lacks reticulation on the stem.

The edible Neoboletus luridiformis can be distinguished from S. luridus by its dark brown cap and absence of any reticulation on the stem; it also grows on sandy soils associated with conifers. In genus Rubroboletus, R. satanas is also found on chalky soils, but produces larger and more robust fruit bodies with a pale cap and differently patterned reticulation to S. luridus. Its flesh does not turn blue so intensely on bruising or cutting, while overripe mushrooms often carry a smell of decay. Another red-pored species in this genus, Rubroboletus rhodoxanthus, has characteristic pinkish tones in the cap and a very dense, differently patterned reticulation. When longitudinally cut, its flesh is bright yellow in the stem and stains blue only in the cap.

A number of extra-European boletes share a similar appearance with S. luridus and have been a source of confusion in past. Suillellus hypocarycinus (found in North America) and Boletus subvelutipes (reported from North America and Asia and of yet unclear phylogenetic placement), can be somewhat similar, but lack reticulation on the stem. Initially collected in Michigan under oak, Boletus vinaceobasis resembles S. luridus, but has shorter spores and its cystidia are dark brown in Melzer's reagent. This species' phylogenetic position also remains unresolved. Also in North America, Rubroboletus pulcherrimus can be somewhat similar, but has a more robust stem and deeper red pores. The Chinese species Neoboletus sinensis, originally described as a form of S. luridus but now placed in a different genus, has considerably larger spores, reported to reach 12–17 by 5.5–7 μm. Collections closely resembling S. luridus have also been recorded in Australia, though later renamed Boletus barragensis as they differ in spore size and a preference for trees of the family Myrtaceae.

== Ecology and distribution ==
The fungus grows in a mycorrhizal association with broad-leaved trees such as oak (Quercus), birch (Betula), chestnut (Castanea) and beech (Fagus), on chalky (calcareous) soils. In the Czech Republic, the variety rubriceps has been reported growing under linden (Tilia). It is also suspected of being a mycorrhizal associate of subshrub rock roses in the genus Helianthemum.

Field studies indicate that the fungus, when paired as a mycorrhizal partner with seedlings of the conifer Cunninghamia lanceolata, increases the seedling's survival rate, augments its height and ground diameter, and increases the chlorophyll content in the leaves. A similar growth-enhancing effect had been noted earlier with Pinus taiwanensis seedlings. These beneficial effects on plant growth are a result of multiple interactions among the fungus, host plant, and indigenous soil microbes that increase the biomass of carbon, and increase the bacterial diversity in the mycorrhizosphere. In a study comparing the salinity resistance of three common ectomycorrhizal fungi (the others were Suillus bovinus and S. luteus), S. luridus was the most tolerant to high concentrations of salt, and is a good candidate species for the inoculation of tree seedlings to be planted on saline soil. Fruit bodies grow singly or scattered on the ground, from June to November after summer rains. S. luridus may occur in parks near a single tree, though it is very rarely found in acidic soils.

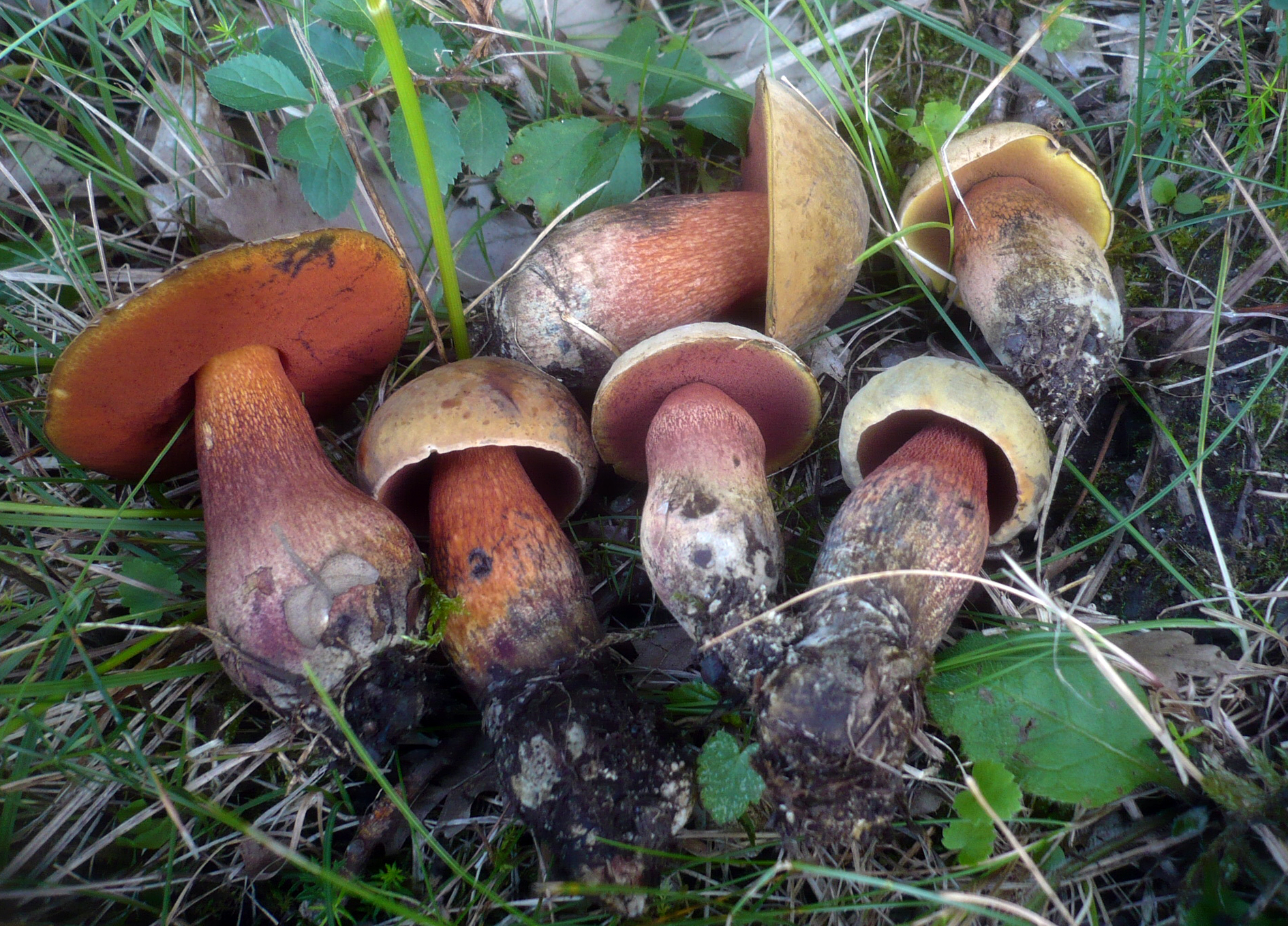
A collection from Austria

The predilection of insects for this mushroom was noted by 19th-century British mycologist Anna Maria Hussey, who wrote in 1847:

there are very few of the soft-fleshed tribes, all of which are the nurseries of innumerable insects, so much in favour as the poisonous Boletus luridus, on breaking an old one it is a living mass of larvae. Our present subject is so soon attacked by insects that it is very rare to find specimens devoid of wriggling life, and being a very common and abundant kind, it must be of great service in the economy of insect existence.

Several fly species have been recorded feeding on the fruit bodies, including Phaonia boleticola, P. rufipalpis, Thricops diaphanus, and, in North America, Drosophila falleni, Pegomya mallochi, P. winthemi, Megaselia pygmaeoides, and Muscina assimilis. In contrast, slugs tend to avoid consuming this species.

Based on phylogenetically verified collections and belowground DNA studies of mycelial distribution, the fungus appears to be native to Europe and has been so far documented in Austria, Cyprus, Denmark, Estonia, France, Italy, Montenegro and Sweden. Its distribution may extend east to the Black Sea and eastern Anatolia regions of Turkey, and south to the Bar'am Forest in the Upper Galilee region of northern Israel, although these reports are in need of molecular verification.

A number of extra-European reports can be found in literature predating DNA studies, ranging from India and Pakistan, to Canada, the United States, Mexico, Costa Rica, China and Taiwan, but these have not been confirmed by molecular testing and are more likely to represent similar, misidentified taxa.

== Toxicity/edibility ==
Mild tasting, Suillellus luridus is often reported as edible after thorough cooking. It is highly regarded in France, while it is commonly consumed in Italy, the Czech Republic, and Slovakia as well as other parts of Europe. However, caution is advised if choosing this species for consumption, as it resembles some poisonous blue-staining boletes and some guidebooks recommend avoiding it altogether. If eaten raw or insufficiently cooked, symptoms of gastrointestinal poisoning can occur within 30 minutes to two hours, including nausea, vomiting, abdominal cramps, and diarrhoea. A full recovery can be expected within 24 to 48 hours if fluid losses are restored.

Suillellus luridus has been suspected of causing an enhanced alcohol sensitivity similar to that caused by the common ink cap (Coprinopsis atramentaria), with gastric symptoms. A German mycologist reported having suffered symptoms himself upon imbibing alcohol with this "otherwise excellent" mushroom. A 1982 report of three cases from Switzerland further incriminated the species, yet a 1994 study casts doubt on this; researchers Ulrich Kiwitt and Hartmut Laatsch looked for antabuse-like compound coprine content in S. luridus and similar species, and found none in the historical suspect but did find indications for it in the rare Imperator torosus. They concluded that the most likely explanation for historical incidents was a misidentification of B. torosus with S. luridus, though they could not rule out S. luridus containing a hitherto unidentified compound causing alcohol-related reactions.

== Chemistry ==
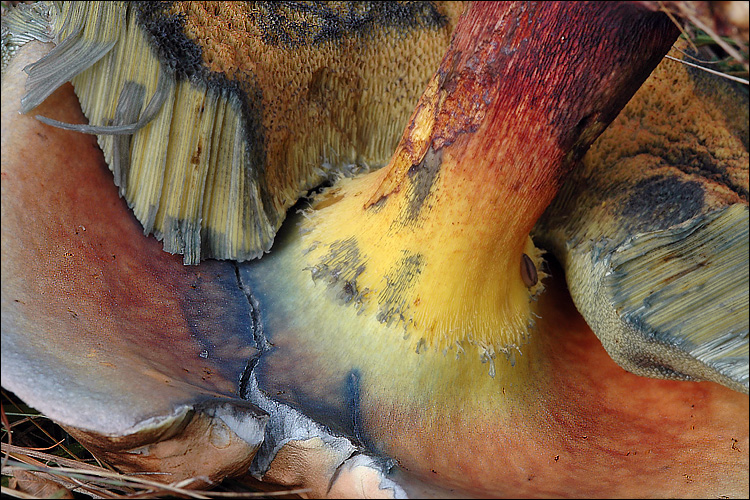
Several carotenoids are responsible for the various colours of the cap, tubes, and stem, while variegatic and xerocomic acid cause the bluing reaction that occurs with tissue injury.

The composition of the volatile flavour compounds of Suillellus luridus consists largely of linoleic acid, with smaller proportions of 1-butanol, 3-methyl-1-butanol, pentadecanoic acid, palmitic acid, linoleic acid methyl ester, and heptadecanoic acid. Pyrazine compounds might be responsible for the characteristic odour of the dried mushroom. The predominant sterol present in the fruit bodies is ergosterol, with smaller amounts of closely related derivative compounds. The main fatty acids of the mushroom include linoleic acid (53.4% of total fatty acids), oleic acid (24.1%), and palmitic acid (10.2%). Arginine is the free amino acid found in the highest concentration (96.9 μM per gram of dry weight), followed by glutamine (9.7) and alanine (8.2).

The carotenoid content of the fruit bodies differs substantially between the cap, the tubes, and the stem. The upper part of the cap, which contains 3.1 micrograms of carotenoid per gram (μg/g) fresh weight, has predominantly mutatochrome (47% of total carotenoids), 4-keto-α-carotene (40.2%), and δ-carotene (6.4%). The major carotenoids in the tubes (totaling 4.3 μg/g) include neurosporaxanthin (31.1%), auroxanthin (17.2%), 4-keto-α-carotene (17.1%), and rhodopin (15.8%). The stem (1.2 μg/g) contains primarily auroxanthin (32.5%), followed by 4-keto-α-carotene (19.9%), β-zeacarotene (18.5%), and rhodopin (11.4%). The colour change observed with tissue injury is caused by variegatic and xerocomic acids, both of which turn blue when oxidized enzymatically upon exposure to air.

== See also ==
- List of North American boletes
- Hallucinogenic bolete mushroom
