= C40H58 =

The molecular formula C_{40}H_{58} (molar mass: 538.89 g/mol, exact mass: 538.4539 u) may refer to:

- Neurosporene
- α-Zeacarotene
- β-Zeacarotene
