= Zeacarotene =

Zeacarotene may refer to:

- α-Zeacarotene
- β-Zeacarotene
