= Boletus gansuensis =

Scientific classification
- Domain: Eukaryota
- Kingdom: Fungi
- Division: Basidiomycota
- Class: Agaricomycetes
- Order: Boletales
- Family: Boletaceae
- Genus: Boletus
- Species: B. gansuensis

Binomial name
- Boletus gansuensis Q.B.Wang, T.H.Li & Y.J.Yao (2003)

Species of fungus

Boletus gansuensis is a species of bolete fungus in the family Boletaceae. Found in China, where it grows in association with Himalayan birch (Betula utilis), it was described as new to science in 2003. The fruitbodies of the fungus have red caps, pinkish-red pores on the cap underside, and a somewhat furfuraceous stipe (i.e., covered in scaly, branlike particles). The specific epithet refers to the type locality in Gansu Province, China. Similar species include the European Suillellus queletii, and the North American and Asian Boletus subvelutipes.

== See also ==
List of Boletus species
