= Flesh =

Soft tissue of an organism

Flesh is any aggregation of soft tissues of an organism. Various multicellular organisms have soft tissues that may be called "flesh". In mammals, including humans, flesh encompasses muscles, fats and other loose connective tissues, but sometimes excludes non-muscular organs (liver, lung, spleen, kidney) and typically discarded parts (hard tendon, brain tissue, intestines, etc.). More generally, it may be considered the portions of the body that are soft and delicate. In a culinary context, consumable animal flesh is called meat, while processed visceral tissues are known as offal.

In particular animal groups such as vertebrates, molluscs and arthropods, the flesh is distinguished from tougher body structures such as bone, shell and scute, respectively. In plants, the "flesh" is the juicy, edible structures such as the mesocarp of fruits and melons, as well as soft tubers, rhizomes, and taproots, as opposed to tougher structures like nuts and stems. In fungi, flesh refers to trama, the soft, inner portion of a mushroom, or fruit body.

A more restrictive usage may be found in some contexts, such as the visual arts, where flesh may refer only to visibly exposed human skin, as opposed to parts of the body covered by clothing and hair. Flesh as a descriptor for colour usually refers to the non-melanated pale or pinkish skin colour of white humans; however, it can also be used to refer to the colour of any human skin.

In Christian religious circles, the flesh is a metaphor associated with carnality.

== Gallery ==
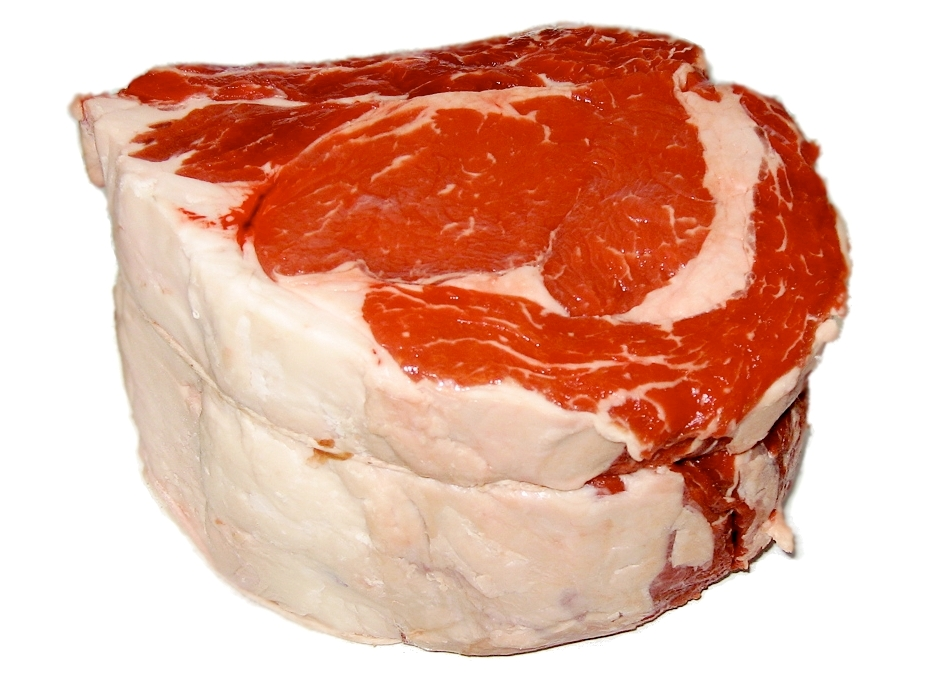
Cow flesh (beef)

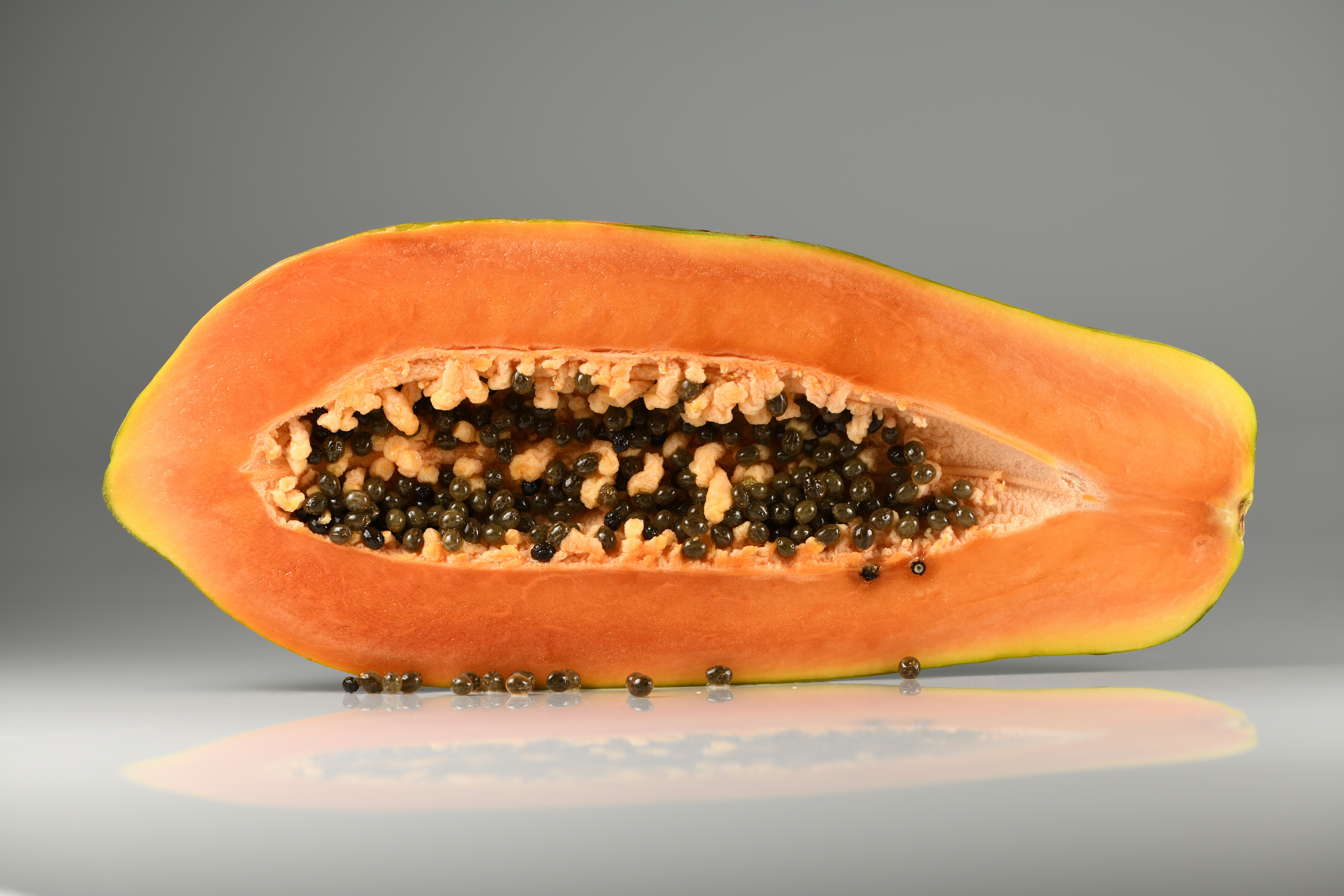
Flesh of a papaya fruit

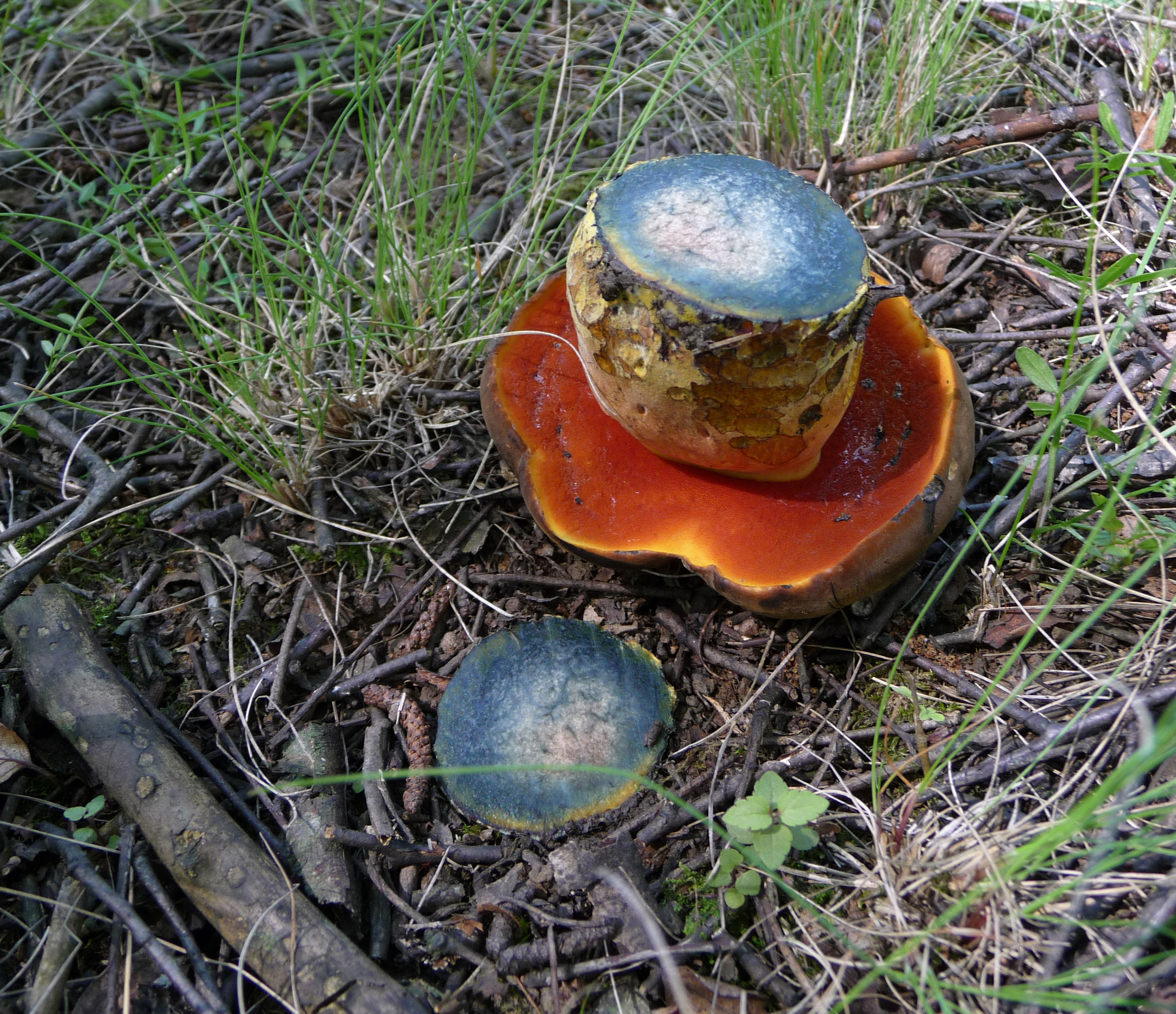
Cut mushroom (Neoboletus luridiformis) revealing blue flesh

== See also ==
- Meat
- Viscera
- Skin
- Tissue (biology)
