= Mutatochrome =

Names
- IUPAC name 4,4,7a-Trimethyl-2-[(2E,4E,6E,8E,10E,12E,14E,16E)-6,11,15-trimethyl-17-(2,6,6-trimethylcyclohexen-1-yl)heptadeca-2,4,6,8,10,12,14,16-octaen-2-yl]-2,5,6,7-tetrahydro-1-benzofuran
- Other names Citroxanthin; Flavacin; β-Carotene oxide;(6E,6′E)-5,8-Epoxy-5,8-dihydro-β,β-carotene

Identifiers
CAS Number	515-06-0
3D model (JSmol)	Interactive image
ChemSpider	4444658
KEGG	C08605
PubChem CID	5281246
UNII	MO0US97U17
- InChI: InChI=1S/C40H56O/c1-30(19-13-20-32(3)24-25-35-33(4)23-15-26-38(35,6)7)17-11-12-18-31(2)21-14-22-34(5)36-29-37-39(8,9)27-16-28-40(37,10)41-36/h11-14,17-22,24-25,29,36H,15-16,23,26-28H2,1-10H3/b12-11+,19-13+,21-14+,25-24+,30-17+,31-18+,32-20+,34-22+ Key: GFPJSSAOISEBQL-FZKBJVJCSA-N; InChI=1/C40H56O/c1-30(19-13-20-32(3)24-25-35-33(4)23-15-26-38(35,6)7)17-11-12-18-31(2)21-14-22-34(5)36-29-37-39(8,9)27-16-28-40(37,10)41-36/h11-14,17-22,24-25,29,36H,15-16,23,26-28H2,1-10H3/b12-11+,19-13+,21-14+,25-24+,30-17+,31-18+,32-20+,34-22+ Key: GFPJSSAOISEBQL-FZKBJVJCBZ
- SMILES: CC1=C(C(CCC1)(C)C)/C=C/C(=C/C=C/C(=C/C=C/C=C(\C)/C=C/C=C(\C)/C2C=C3C(CCCC3(O2)C)(C)C)/C)/C

Properties
Chemical formula	C_{40}H_{56}O
Molar mass	552.887 g·mol^{−1}
- Except where otherwise noted, data are given for materials in their standard state (at 25 °C [77 °F], 100 kPa). Infobox references

Mutatochrome (5,8-epoxy-β-carotene) is a carotenoid. It is the predominant carotenoid in the cap of the bolete mushroom Boletus luridus.
