= Neoboletus sinensis =

Scientific classification
- Domain: Eukaryota
- Kingdom: Fungi
- Division: Basidiomycota
- Class: Agaricomycetes
- Order: Boletales
- Family: Boletaceae
- Genus: Neoboletus
- Species: N. sinensis

Binomial name
- Neoboletus sinensis (T.H. Li & M. Zang) Gelardi, Simonini & Vizzini 2014

Synonyms
- Xerocomus sinensis; Boletus luridus f. sinensis T.H. Li

Species of fungus

Neoboletus sinensis, known until 2014 as Boletus sinensis, is a species of bolete fungus in the family Boletaceae native to Hainan province in China. It is closely related to, and was previously considered a form of, Suillellus luridus. It was transferred to the new genus Neoboletus in 2014.
