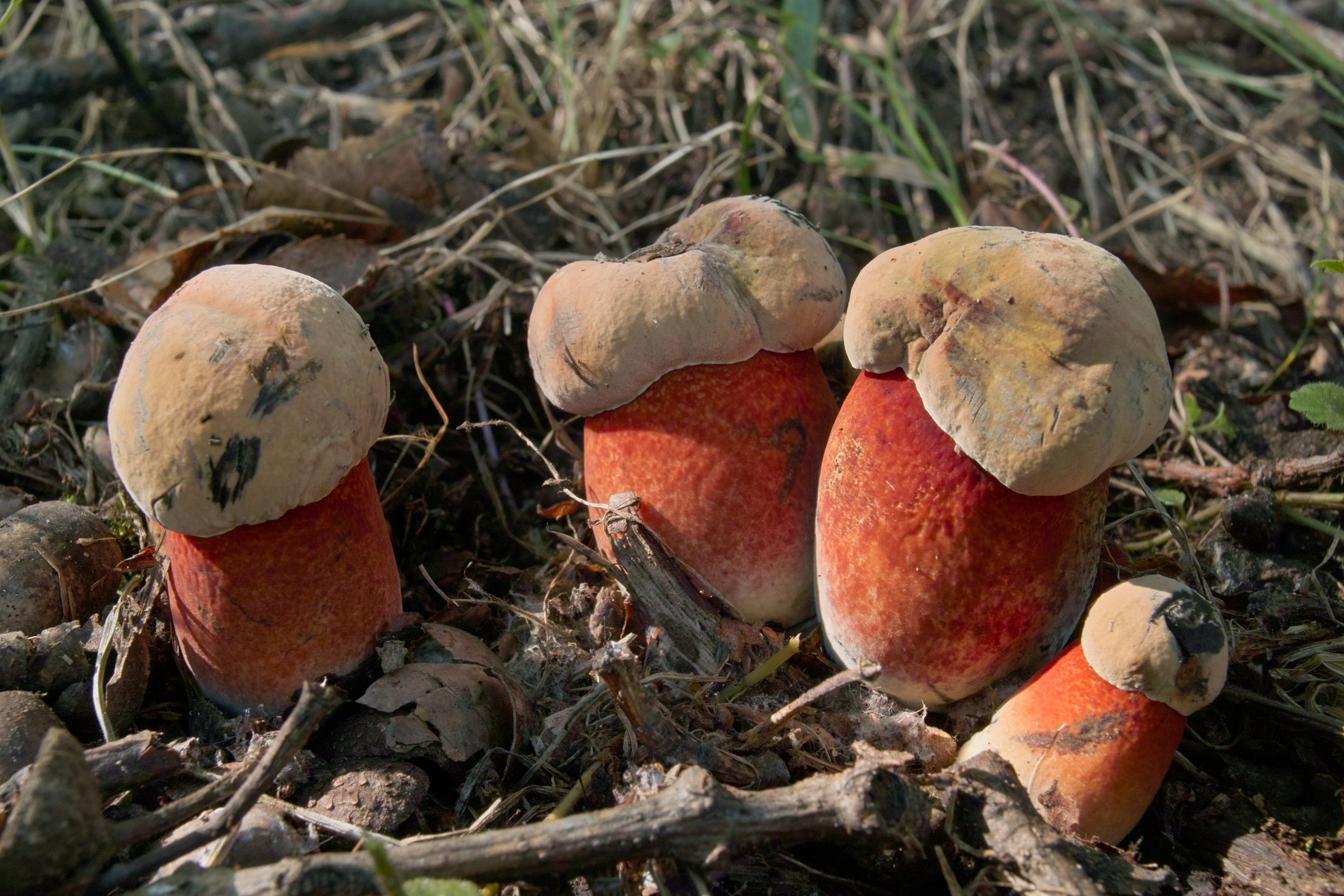

Scientific classification
- Domain: Eukaryota
- Kingdom: Fungi
- Division: Basidiomycota
- Class: Agaricomycetes
- Order: Boletales
- Family: Boletaceae
- Genus: Suillellus
- Species: S. mendax

Binomial name
- Suillellus mendax (Simonini & Vizzini) Vizzini, Simonini & Gelardi (2014)

Synonyms
- Boletus mendax Simonini & Vizzini (2013)

= Suillellus mendax =

Species of bolete fungus

Suillellus mendax is a species of bolete fungus found in Europe that forms beneficial relationships with beech, oak, and sweet chestnut trees. First described scientifically in 2013, the fungus produces mushrooms with olive-buff to crimson-red caps, bright yellow pores that turn scarlet-red, and stipes adorned with a crimson network pattern on an orange-red background. Its species epithet mendax, meaning "false" or "deceptive" in Latin, alludes to its close resemblance to the widespread Suillellus luridus, from which it differs by its preference for acidic soils, velvety cap texture, and more elongated spores. The species has been confirmed through DNA studies in Italy, France, and Cyprus, where it typically grows in acidic woodland habitats.

== Taxonomy ==
The species was originally described as Boletus mendax by Giampaolo Simonini and Alfredo Vizzini in a molecular and morphological study of section Luridi (typified by Boletus luridus) in 2014. The epithet mendax—Latin for "false" or "deceptive"—refers to its superficial resemblance to B. luridus. Subsequent work has transferred the species to the genus Suillellus, making its current name Suillellus mendax.

This species is morphologically very similar to the widespread Suillellus luridus, but differs in its predominantly acidophilous ecology, a mostly dull-coloured, finely felty cap and more narrowly ellipsoid to subfusiform spores measuring (12.4–)13.3–14.7(–15.5) × (4.5–)4.9– 5.5(–5.7) μm.

== Description ==
The fruit bodies have caps (pilei) 4–12 cm across, initially hemispherical to convex before flattening, with a distinctly velvety to tomentose surface. Cap colours vary from pale olive-buff in young specimens to deep crimson-red or brownish-red in mature or wet conditions. The stipe measures 4–12 cm long by 0.8–3 cm thick, cylindrical to slightly swollen or tapered at the base, and bears a variable reticulation (net-like pattern) of crimson network on an orange-red ground; the lower stipe often shows fine dark granules or a brown tomentum. The pore surface consists of small, round pores that are bright yellow at first, soon turning vivid scarlet-red, and bruise blue when pressed. The flesh is pale yellow but almost immediately turns indigo-blue on exposure. Spore prints are olive-brown. Microscopically, spores are elongated—about 13–15 × 5–5.7 μm—and the stipe base context shows a strong amyloid reaction.

== Habitat and distribution ==
Suillellus mendax forms ectomycorrhizal associations with beech (Fagus), oak (Quercus) and sweet chestnut (Castanea). So far, it has been molecularly verified from Italy, France, and the island of Cyprus.
