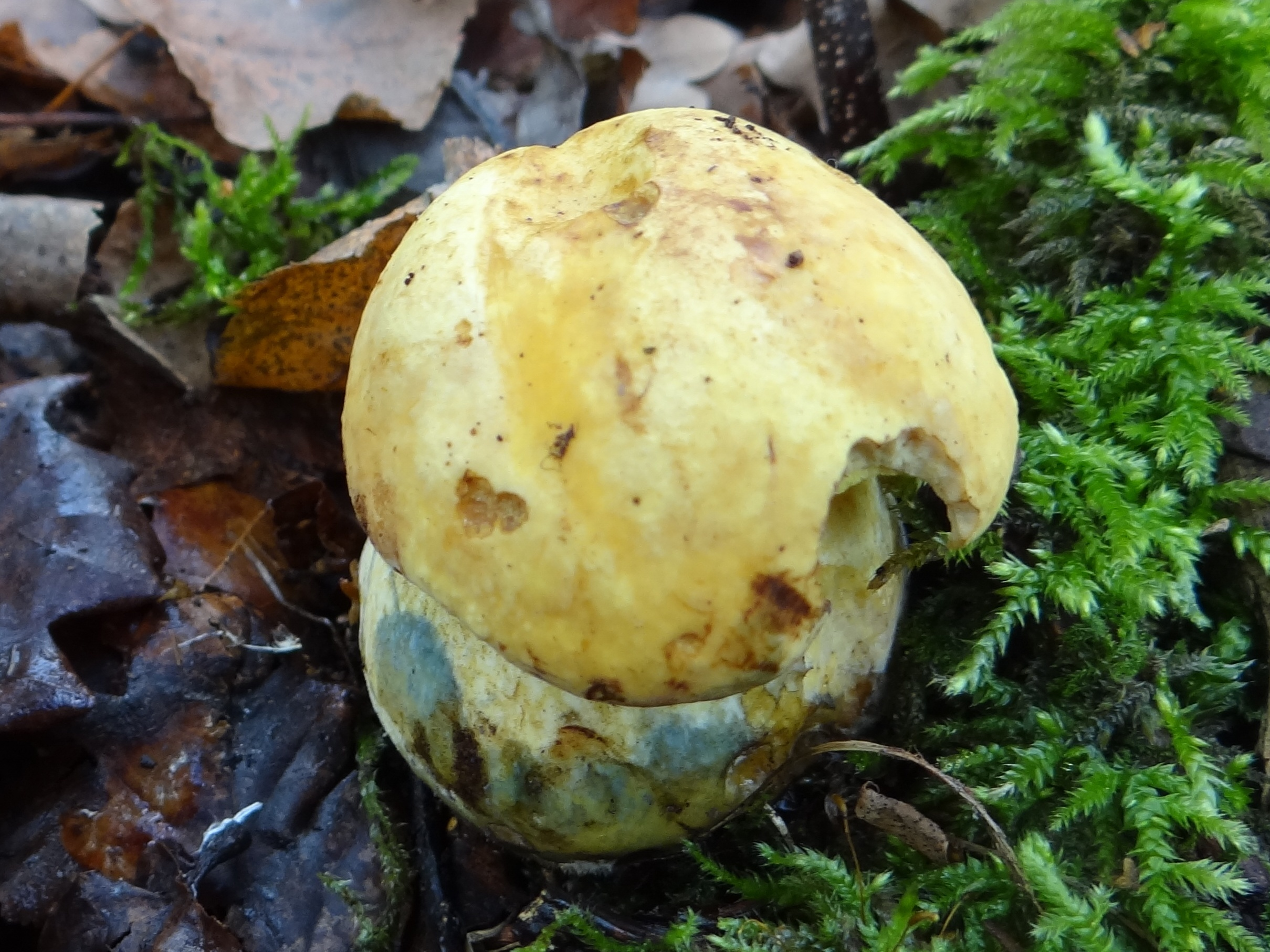
- Neoboletus junquilleus

Scientific classification
- Kingdom: Fungi
- Division: Basidiomycota
- Class: Agaricomycetes
- Order: Boletales
- Family: Boletaceae
- Genus: Neoboletus; Gelardi, Simonini & Vizzini (2014)

Type species
- Neoboletus luridiformis (Rostk.) Gelardi, Simonini & Vizzini (2014)

= Neoboletus =

Genus of fungi

Neoboletus is a genus of fungi in the family Boletaceae, native to holarctic regions. It was circumscribed in 2014 by Italian mycologists Matteo Gelardi, Giampaolo Simonini and Alfredo Vizzini, and further by Chinese mycologists Gang Wu and Zhu L. Yang in 2015. Closely related to the genus Sutorius, members of this genus differ by staining blue when bruised. They have brown pores and lack a reticulated pattern on their stipes. The erection of Neoboletus follows recent molecular studies that outlined a new phylogenetic framework for the Boletaceae. The type species is Neoboletus luridiformis. Five species were added to the genus by Gelardi and Vizzini in 2014.

Neoboletus was merged into Sutorius in Wu et al. (2016); it was demerged in Chai et al. (2019).

== Species ==
Image	Scientific name	Taxon author	Year	Distribution
	Neoboletus antillanus	Angelini, Gelardi, Costanzo & Vizzini,	2019	Dominican Republic
	Neoboletus erythropus	(Pers.) C. Hahn	2015 (1796)	
	Neoboletus ferrugineus	(G. Wu, Fang Li & Zhu L. Yang) N.K. Zeng, H. Chai & Zhi Q. Liang	2019 (2016)	China (Hainan)
	Neoboletus flavidus	(G. Wu & Zhu L. Yang) N.K. Zeng, H. Chai & Zhi Q. Liang	2019 (2016)	China ( Yunnan)
	Neoboletus flavosanguineus	(Lavorato & Simonini) Biketova, Wasser, Simonini & Gelardi	2021 (1997)	Italy
	Neoboletus hainanensis	(T.H. Li & M. Zang) N.K. Zeng, H. Chai & Zhi Q. Liang	2019 (2001)	China (Hainan)
	Neoboletus immutatus	(Pegler & A.E. Hills) Blanco-Dios	2018 (1996)	United Kingdom
	Neoboletus infuscatus	N.K. Zeng, S. Jiang & Zhi Q. Liang	2021	China (Hainan)
	Neoboletus luridiformis (Gewone heksenboleet)	(Rostk.) Gelardi, Simonini & Vizzini	2014 (1844)	Northern Europe and North America
	Neoboletus multipunctatus	N.K. Zeng, H. Chai & S. Jiang	2019	
	Neoboletus obscureumbrinus	(Hongo) N.K. Zeng, H. Chai & Zhi Q. Liang	2019 (1968)	Japan, southern China
	Neoboletus praestigiator	(R. Schulz) Svetash., Gelardi, Simonini & Vizzini	2016 (1924)	
	Neoboletus rubriporus	(G. Wu & Zhu L. Yang) N.K. Zeng, H. Chai & Zhi Q. Liang	2019 (2016)	
	Neoboletus sanguineoides	(G. Wu & Zhu L. Yang) N.K. Zeng, H. Chai & Zhi Q. Liang	2019 (2016)	
	Neoboletus sanguineus	(G. Wu & Zhu L. Yang) N.K. Zeng, H. Chai & Zhi Q. Liang	2019 (2016)	
	Neoboletus sinensis	(T.H. Li & M. Zang) Gelardi, Simonini & Vizzini	2014 (2001)	China (Hainan)
	Neoboletus tomentulosus	(M. Zang, W.P. Liu & M.R. Hu) N.K. Zeng, H. Chai & Zhi Q. Liang	2019 (1991)	
	Neoboletus xanthopus	(Klofac & A. Urb.) Klofac & A. Urb.	2014 (2014)	
