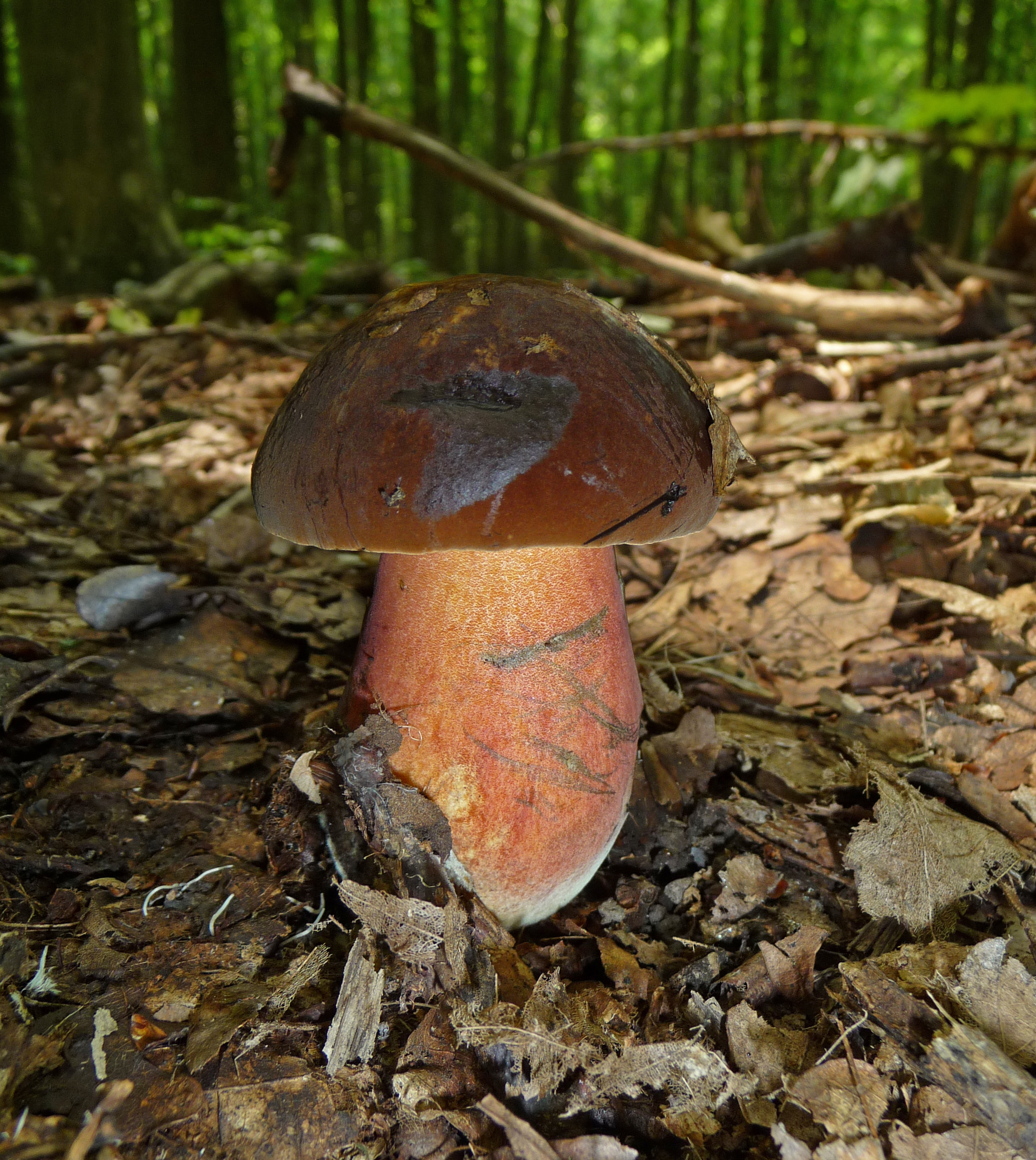
- N. luridiformis, Ukraine

Scientific classification
- Kingdom: Fungi
- Division: Basidiomycota
- Class: Agaricomycetes
- Order: Boletales
- Family: Boletaceae
- Genus: Neoboletus
- Species: N. luridiformis

Binomial name
- Neoboletus luridiformis (Rostk.) Gelardi, Simonini & Vizzini (2014)

Synonyms
- Boletus luridiformis Rostk. (1844); Suillus luridiformis (Rostk.) Kuntze (1898); Boletus erythropus sensu auct.

= Neoboletus luridiformis =

Species of fungus

Neoboletus luridiformis
- Mycological characteristics
- Pores on hymenium
- Cap is convex
- Hymenium is adnate
- Stipe is bare
- Spore print is olive-brown
- Ecology is mycorrhizal
- Edibility is edible but not recommended

Neoboletus luridiformis, also previously known as Boletus luridiformis and (invalidly) as Boletus erythropus, is a fungus of the bolete family, most of which produce mushrooms with tubes and pores beneath their caps. It is commonly known as the scarletina bolete, for its red pores, which are yellow when young. Other common names include the red foot bolete, dotted stemmed bolete, or dotted stem bolete.

It is found in Northern Europe and North America. While edible when cooked properly, it can cause vomiting and diarrhea if not.

== Taxonomy ==
In 1796 Christian Hendrik Persoon described Boletus erythropus, deriving its specific name from the Greek ερυθρος ("red") and πους ("foot"), referring to its red-coloured stalk. During the next 200 years or so, this name was used extensively for the species which is the subject of this article, and which (as well as a red stalk) has red pores. Recently it was discovered however that Persoon's mushroom had orange pores, and was a different species (actually thought to be Suillellus queletii), so the use of this name for the red-pored mushroom was invalid.

In 1844 Friedrich Wilhelm Gottlieb Rostkovius independently defined the red-pored species under the name Boletus luridiformis. That is now the first valid description of the taxon and is the basis of the current name (the basionym). The significance of the epithet "luridiformis" is that it is similar to the previously known fungus Boletus luridus (now Suillellus luridus).

Genetic analysis published in 2013 showed that B. luridiformis and many (but not all) red-pored boletes were part of a dupainii clade (named for Boletus dupainii), well-removed from the core group of Boletus edulis and relatives within the Boletineae. This indicated that it needed to be placed in a new genus. It became the type species of the new genus Neoboletus in 2014.

To avoid confusion, the name Boletus erythropus should now be avoided if possible (though in theory it still has a legitimate meaning as whatever species Persoon originally intended). It is not a valid synonym of Neoboletus luridiformis, and that can be indicated by using the term sensu auct. in place of the author name (that is, Boletus erythropus sensu auct. = Neoboletus luridiformis (Rostk.) Gelardi, Simonini & Vizzini).

== Description ==
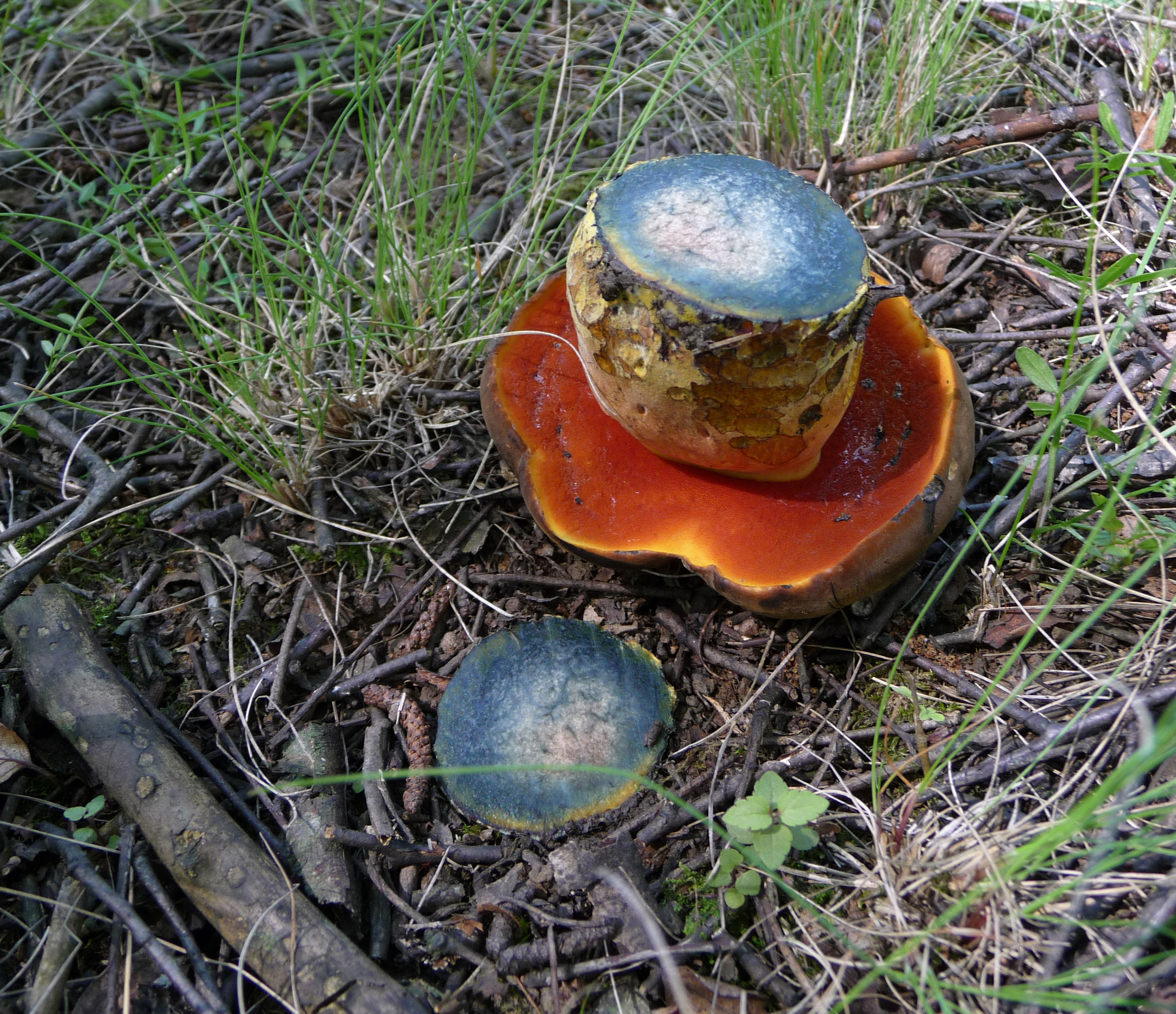
N. luridiformis, found in Ukraine. After cutting, the yellow interior quickly turns blue due to the oxidation of various secondary metabolites

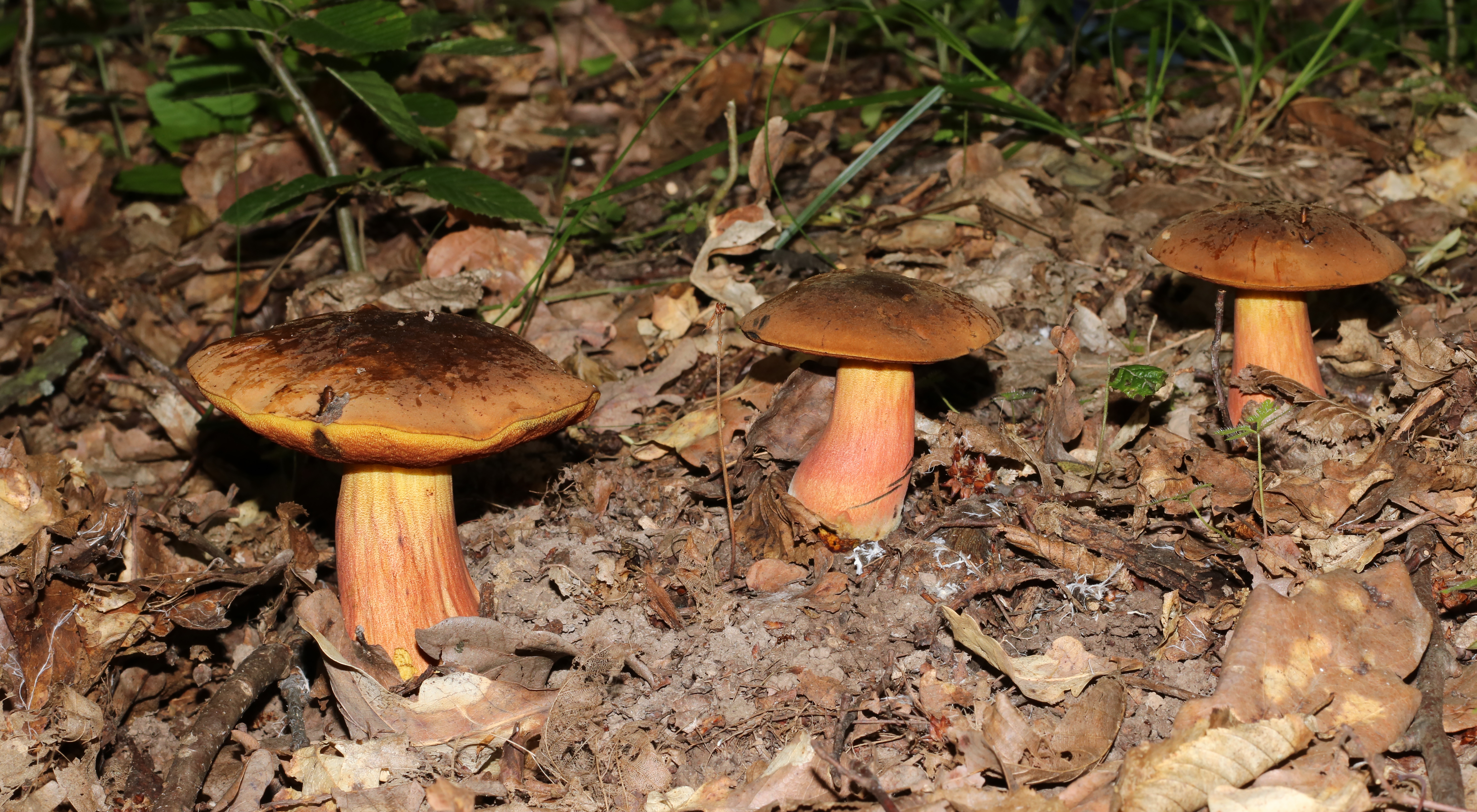
Three N. luridiformis mushrooms

The large, solid fungus has a bay-brown hemispherical to convex cap that can grow up to 20 cm (8 in) wide and is initially velvety. It has small orange-red pores, yellow when young and rusty with age (lending it the name 'scarletina bolete'); these bruise blue to black. The tubes are yellowish-green and become blue quickly on cutting. The fat, colourful, densely red-dotted yellow stem is 4–15 cm (1 1/2–6 in) long and has no network pattern (reticulation). The flesh stains dark blue when bruised; broken, or cut. There is little smell. The spore print is olive-brown.

=== Similar species ===
- Suillellus luridus has a network pattern on the stem, and seems to prefer chalky soil.
- Rubroboletus satanas also has a stem network, but a very-pale whitish cap, and is moderately poisonous.
- Rubroboletus pulcherrimus has a reticulate stipe, and is larger in size.
- Rubroboletus dupainii has a reddish cap.
- Rubroboletus lupinus has a smooth stem.
- Imperator rhodopurpureus prefers neutral soil.

== Distribution and habitat ==
The fungus is common in Europe, growing in deciduous or coniferous woodland in summer and autumn. It is often found in the same places as Boletus edulis. It is also widely distributed in North America, and is especially common under spruce in its range from Northern California to Alaska. In Eastern North America it grows with both soft, and hardwood trees.

== Edibility ==
The mild-flavored species is said to be edible after being well cooked, although some people are adversely affected by it. Mycologist David Arora reported that one man was poisoned after eating a sautéed specimen. Some literature recommends cooking it for 20 minutes. When raw or insufficiently cooked it can cause gastroenteritis, for this same reason it is not recommended for drying. Caution is advised as it resembles other potentially hazardous blue-staining boletes and should thus be avoided by novice mushroom hunters. It is commonly collected in several European countries.
