= Α-Zeacarotene =

Previtamin

α-Zeacarotene

Names
- IUPAC name (6R)-7',8'-Dihydro-ε,psi-carotene
- Systematic IUPAC name (6R)-6-[(1E,3E,5E,7E,9E,11E,13E,15E,19E)-3,7,12,16,20,24-hexamethylpentacosa-1,3,5,7,9,11,13,15,19,23-decaenyl]-1,5,5-trimethylcyclohexene

Identifiers
CAS Number	50657-19-7
3D model (JSmol)	Interactive image
Beilstein Reference	2512967
ChEBI	CHEBI:35063
ChemSpider	4445511
KEGG	C14146
PubChem CID	6441660
UNII	A5UH388E6T
CompTox Dashboard (EPA)	DTXSID201317733
- InChI: InChI=1S/C40H58/c1-32(2)18-13-21-35(5)24-15-26-36(6)25-14-22-33(3)19-11-12-20-34(4)23-16-27-37(7)29-30-39-38(8)28-17-31-40(39,9)10/h11-12,14,16,18-20,22-25,27-30,39H,13,15,17,21,26,31H2,1-10H3/b12-11+,22-14+,23-16+,30-29+,33-19+,34-20+,35-24+,36-25+,37-27+/t39-/m0/s1 Key: IGABZIVJSNQMPZ-DWQNOKSTSA-N; InChI=1S/C40H58/c1-32(2)18-13-21-35(5)24-15-26-36(6)25-14-22-33(3)19-11-12-20-34(4)23-16-27-37(7)29-30-39-38(8)28-17-31-40(39,9)10/h11-12,14,16,18-20,22-25,27-30,39H,13,15,17,21,26,31H2,1-10H3/b12-11+,22-14+,23-16+,30-29+,33-19+,34-20+,35-24+,36-25+,37-27+/t39-/m0/s1 Key: ANVAOWXLWRTKGA-JLTXGRSLBQ
- SMILES: CC1=CCCC([C@H]1/C=C/C(=C/C=C/C(=C/C=C/C=C(\C)/C=C/C=C(\C)/CC/C=C(\C)/CCC=C(C)C)/C)/C)(C)C

Properties
Chemical formula	C_{40}H_{58}
Molar mass	538.45385
- Except where otherwise noted, data are given for materials in their standard state (at 25 °C [77 °F], 100 kPa). verify (what is ?) Infobox references

α-Zeacarotene (alpha-zeacarotene) is a form of carotene with a β-ionone ring at one end and a ζ-ionone ring at the opposite end. It is an intermediate in the biosynthesis of various carotenoids and plays a crucial role in the metabolic pathway leading to the production of lycopene and other important carotenoids.

== Chemical structure and properties ==
The molecular formula of α-zeacarotene is C40H58, with an average molecular weight of 538.89 g/mol. Its IUPAC name is 6-[(1E,3Z,5E,7E,9E,11Z,13E,15E,19Z)-3,7,12,16,20,24-hexamethylpentacosa-1,3,5,7,9,11,13,15,19,23-decaen-1-yl]-1,5,5-trimethylcyclohex-1-ene. The compound is an isomer of β-zeacarotene and exists in both (6R)-isomer and (trans)-isomer forms.

α-Zeacarotene is characterized by a predicted boiling point of 637.98 °C at 760 mm Hg and an estimated water solubility of 8.7e-14 mg/L at 25°C, indicating very low solubility in water. Its predicted logP values range from 9.66 to 15.27, highlighting its lipophilic nature.

== Biological role and function ==
In biological systems, α-zeacarotene functions as an intermediate in the biosynthesis of other carotenoids, including lycopene and β-carotene. It is primarily located in the cytoplasm and cell membranes. The compound also plays a role in cell signaling and lipid metabolism, particularly within the lipid peroxidation and fatty acid metabolism pathways.

α-Zeacarotene has been detected in various plant sources, particularly cereals such as corn and breakfast cereals, and is considered both an endogenous (naturally occurring within organisms) and exogenous (obtained through diet) nutrient.

== Antioxidant activity and health implications ==
Like many carotenoids, α-zeacarotene is recognized for its antioxidant properties, which play a crucial role in neutralizing reactive oxygen species (ROS) within biological systems. ROS are highly reactive molecules that can damage cells, leading to oxidative stress and contributing to the development of chronic diseases such as cardiovascular disease, cancer, and neurodegenerative disorders. While α-zeacarotene's antioxidant activity has not been studied as extensively as other carotenoids like β-carotene or lycopene, preliminary research suggests it may offer similar protective effects. Diets rich in carotenoids, including α-zeacarotene, are associated with a reduced risk of these conditions due to their ability to support cellular health and mitigate oxidative damage.

== Role in agriculture and biofortification ==
α-Zeacarotene has also gained interest in agricultural research, particularly in the context of biofortification. Biofortification refers to the process of increasing the nutrient content of crops through conventional breeding or genetic engineering. Because carotenoids are important precursors to vitamin A, biofortifying staple crops like maize, rice, and wheat with α-zeacarotene and related carotenoids could help combat vitamin A deficiency in regions where access to diverse diets is limited. This deficiency is a significant public health issue, particularly in developing countries, where it can lead to visual impairment and increased susceptibility to infections. The ability to enhance carotenoid content in crops offers a sustainable way to improve nutritional outcomes in vulnerable populations.

== Environmental factors and stability in plants ==
The concentration of α-zeacarotene in plants can be influenced by a variety of environmental factors, including light, temperature, and soil quality. Studies have shown that increased light exposure, particularly in the blue light spectrum, can enhance carotenoid production, including α-zeacarotene, in plant tissues. However, the compound is also prone to degradation when exposed to excessive sunlight, particularly ultraviolet (UV) radiation, which can break down the carotenoid structure and reduce its biological effectiveness. This sensitivity to environmental factors underscores the importance of optimal storage and handling conditions for α-zeacarotene-rich foods and products, both in agriculture and in post-harvest processes.

== Research on biosynthetic pathways ==
Recent advances in plant molecular biology have allowed researchers to explore the specific enzymes involved in the biosynthesis of α-zeacarotene. Enzymes such as phytoene synthase and lycopene β-cyclase play key roles in converting precursor molecules into α-zeacarotene, which in turn can be further processed into other carotenoids. Genetic manipulation of these enzymes in model plants has demonstrated the potential to alter the levels of α-zeacarotene and related carotenoids, offering new insights into plant metabolism and the regulation of carotenoid synthesis. Understanding these pathways not only contributes to agricultural innovations but also offers opportunities for improving the nutritional content of foods and developing novel carotenoid-based supplements.

== Potential industrial uses in cosmetics and pharmaceuticals ==
Beyond its applications in the food and agricultural industries, α-zeacarotene holds potential in the cosmetics and pharmaceutical sectors. Due to its lipophilic nature and antioxidant properties, it may be incorporated into skincare products aimed at protecting the skin from oxidative stress and environmental damage. Additionally, its potential role in reducing inflammation and supporting cell regeneration makes it a candidate for anti-aging formulations. In the pharmaceutical industry, research into carotenoid derivatives is exploring their use in preventing or treating diseases related to oxidative stress, such as age-related macular degeneration (AMD) and certain types of cancer.

== Mechanisms of action in the body ==
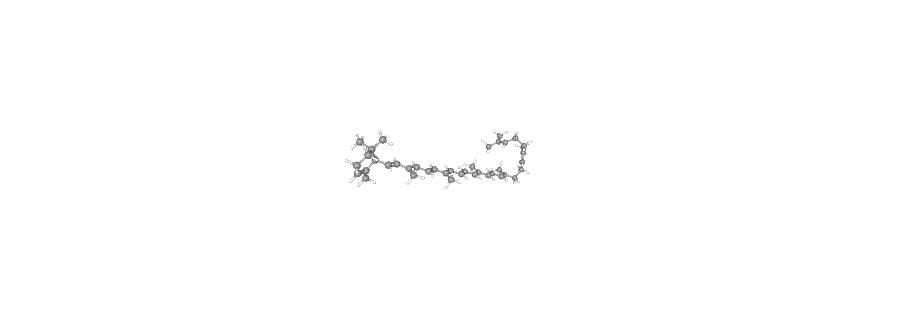
α-Zeacarotene

The mechanisms by which α-zeacarotene exerts its biological effects are still under investigation. However, it is believed that its antioxidant properties primarily stem from its ability to scavenge free radicals and inhibit lipid peroxidation. This capability not only protects cellular components from oxidative damage but also helps maintain the integrity of cellular membranes. Additionally, α-zeacarotene may influence gene expression related to antioxidant enzymes, enhancing the body's overall antioxidant defense system. Research has indicated that carotenoids can modulate cell signaling pathways involved in inflammation and cell survival, potentially contributing to the prevention of various diseases.

== Potential synergistic effects with other nutrients ==
The health benefits of α-zeacarotene may be enhanced when consumed in combination with other carotenoids and nutrients. For instance, the presence of dietary fats can improve the absorption of carotenoids, leading to greater bioavailability and effectiveness. Additionally, carotenoids often work synergistically, meaning that the combined effect of multiple carotenoids may be greater than the sum of their individual effects. This synergy is particularly relevant in the context of a balanced diet rich in fruits and vegetables, where various carotenoids, vitamins, and minerals coexist and contribute to overall health.

== Innovations in extraction and utilization ==
Advancements in extraction techniques have opened new avenues for utilizing α-zeacarotene in various industries. Techniques such as supercritical fluid extraction (SFE) and cold pressing are being employed to obtain high-purity carotenoid extracts from plant sources. These innovations not only improve the yield of carotenoids but also preserve their bioactivity, making them more effective in dietary supplements, functional foods, and cosmetic formulations. Furthermore, research into nanoemulsions and delivery systems is enhancing the stability and absorption of α-zeacarotene, allowing for more effective applications in health and wellness products.

== Future research directions ==
Future research on α-zeacarotene should focus on elucidating its specific biological roles and potential health benefits. Investigating its effects in clinical settings could provide insights into its efficacy in preventing or managing chronic diseases. Additionally, studies exploring the interactions of α-zeacarotene with other dietary components, including fatty acids and phytochemicals, could enhance our understanding of its health-promoting properties. Furthermore, research into genetically modified organisms (GMOs) that produce higher levels of α-zeacarotene may lead to more nutrient-dense crops, addressing nutritional deficiencies in vulnerable populations worldwide.

== Industrial applications ==
In addition to its biological roles, α-zeacarotene has applications in the manufacturing industry, particularly as a fluid processing agent and surfactant. It also functions as an emulsifier, playing a role in stabilizing mixtures in industrial processes.

== Synonyms and identification ==
Synonyms: α-Zeacarotene is also known by several other names, including 7',8'-dihydro-epsilon,Psi-carotene, 7',8'-dihydro-e,Y-carotene, and Zeacarotene.
