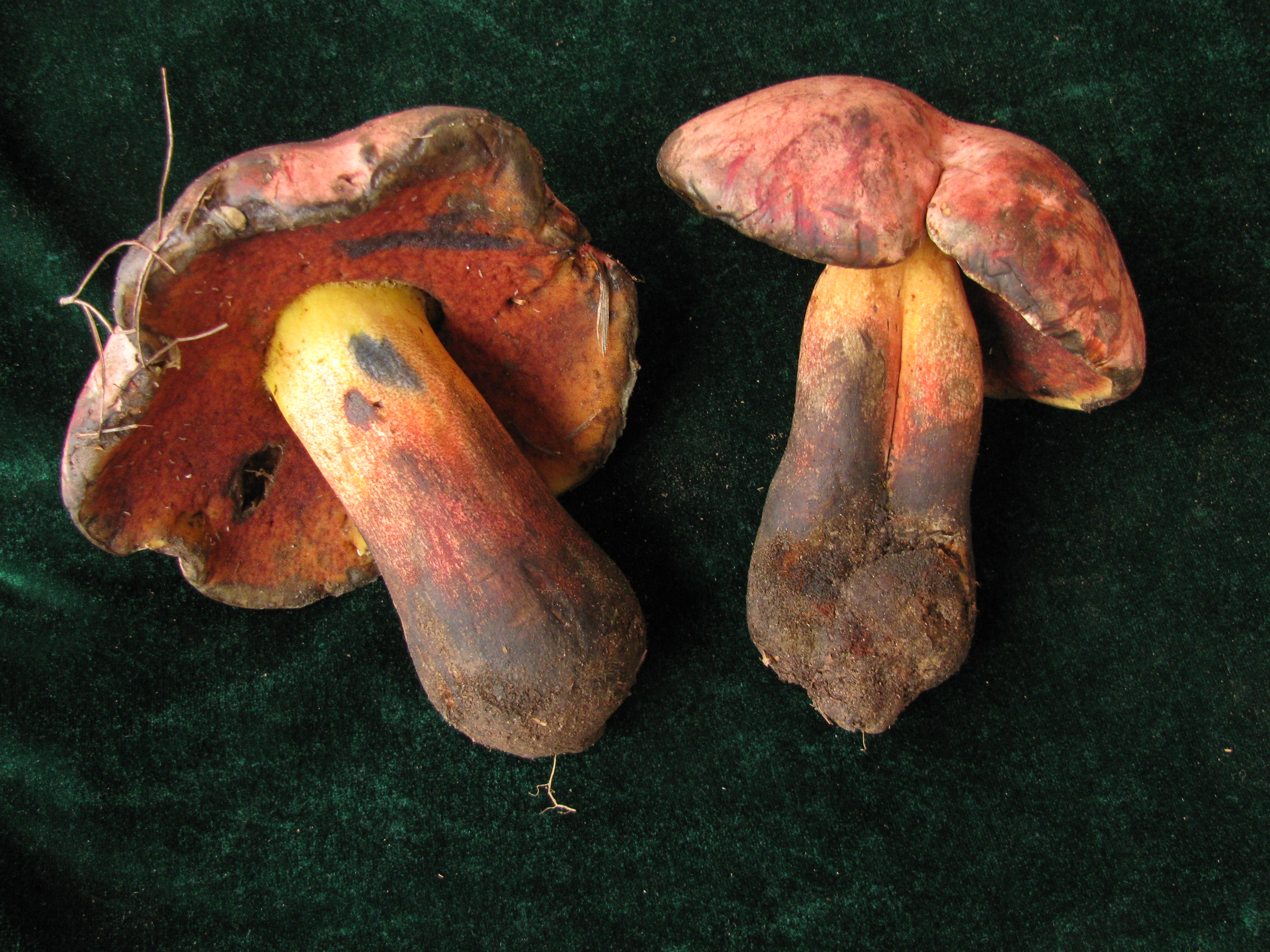

Scientific classification
- Domain: Eukaryota
- Kingdom: Fungi
- Division: Basidiomycota
- Class: Agaricomycetes
- Order: Boletales
- Family: Boletaceae
- Genus: Suillellus
- Species: S. queletii

Binomial name
- Suillellus queletii (Schulzer) Vizzini, Simonini & Gelardi (2014)

Synonyms
- Boletus queletii Schulzer (1885); Versipellis queletii (Schulzer) Quél. (1886); Dictyopus queletii (Schulzer) Quél.; Tubiporus queletii (Schulzer) Maire (1937)

= Suillellus queletii =

Species of fungus

Suillellus queletii Mycological characteristics
- Pores on hymenium
- Cap is convex
- Hymenium is adnexed
- Stipe is bare
- Ecology is mycorrhizal
- Edibility is edible but not recommended

Suillellus queletii (formerly Boletus queletii), commonly known as the deceiving bolete, is an uncommon, edible mushroom in the genus Suillellus.

== Naming ==
Originally described by Stephan Schulzer von Müggenburg in 1885 as a species of Boletus, the fungus was transferred to Suillellus in 2014. The epithet queletii was given in honour of Lucien Quélet.

In 1796 Christiaan Hendrik Persoon described a type of bolete under the name Boletus erythropus and in the next 200 years the same name was widely used for a well-known species having red pores. But recently it was discovered that Persoon's mushroom had orange pores, that usage of the name B. erythropus was invalid, and now the red-pored species (after a separate change to the genus too) has to be called Neoboletus luridiformis). It is best not to use the ambiguous name Boletus erythropus any more, but according to Funga Nordica the fungus described by Persoon was actually Suillellus queletii.

== Description ==
The cap is hemispherical, latter flattening out, appearing olive to reddish-brown, rarely also dark red. The flesh is yellow, turning blue when cut. The pores are initially yellow, soon become orange, and finally can be reddish. The stipe is smooth and golden yellow and the flesh has a slightly acrid taste.

The spore powder is olive and under the microscope the spores appear somewhat spindle-shaped and measure about 10-14 μm × 5-7 μm.

== Distribution and habitat ==
This mycorrhizal mushroom can be found in deciduous forest, at lower altitudes, under beech, oak or hazel.

It is uncommon in Europe and considered endangered in the Czech Republic. In Asia, it has been recorded in Taiwan.
