= Β-Zeacarotene =

β-Zeacarotene

Names
- IUPAC name β,ψ-Carotene
- Systematic IUPAC name 2-[(1E,3E,5E,7E,9E,11E,13E,15E,19E)-3,7,12,16,20,24-Hexamethylpentacosa-1,3,5,7,9,11,13,15,19,23-decaen-1-yl]-1,3,3-trimethylcyclohex-1-ene

Identifiers
CAS Number	514-90-9
3D model (JSmol)	Interactive image
Beilstein Reference	2571810
ChEBI	CHEBI:27533
ChemSpider	4444348
KEGG	C05434
PubChem CID	5280790
CompTox Dashboard (EPA)	DTXSID001045344
- InChI: InChI=1S/C40H58/c1-32(2)18-13-21-35(5)24-15-26-36(6)25-14-22-33(3)19-11-12-20-34(4)23-16-27-37(7)29-30-39-38(8)28-17-31-40(39,9)10/h11-12,14,16,18-20,22-25,27,29-30H,13,15,17,21,26,28,31H2,1-10H3/b12-11+,22-14+,23-16+,30-29+,33-19+,34-20+,35-24+,36-25+,37-27+ Key: MICBIPJWKDDGNL-FILYMEKXSA-N
- SMILES: CC(C)=CCC\C(C)=C\CC\C(C)=C\C=C\C(\C)=C\C=C\C=C(/C)\C=C\C=C(/C)\C=C\C1=C(C)CCCC1(C)C

Properties
Chemical formula	C_{40}H_{58}
Molar mass	538.904 g·mol^{−1}
- Except where otherwise noted, data are given for materials in their standard state (at 25 °C [77 °F], 100 kPa). Infobox references

β-Zeacarotene is a carotenoid. It is used as a coloring agent in the food and pharmaceutical industries. First reported in 1953, it was discovered to occur in small quantities when the fungus Phycomyces blakeseeanus was grown with diphenylamine, a compound that inhibits the synthesis of beta-carotene.
