= L-number =

Classification system for catfish

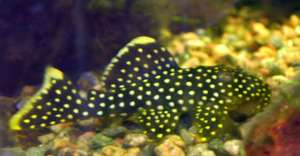
Baryancistrus L-18 is also described as L-85.

The L-number system is a semi-scientific classification system of catfish based on photographs of shipments of tropical catfish of the family Loricariidae published by the German aquarium magazine DATZ (Die Aquarien- und Terrarienzeitschrift (The Aquarium and Terrarium Magazine)). The first L-number was published in 1988.

An L-number is not a formal scientific designation, but it allows people to identify various loricariid catfish by a "common name" before the fish is officially described. When a loricariid receives an official scientific name, the L-number (or numbers) is retired; best practice is then to use the scientific name.

A specific L-number classification does not guarantee a discrete species, multiple L numbers have been given to different populations of the same species. To add to the confusion, sometimes a single L-number may be used for multiple species.

Additionally the aquarium magazine 'Das Aquarium' introduced a similar system using the prefix 'LDA'.

== L-number catfish articles ==
The L-numbers are listed below in numerical order. The preceding number holds precedence over the higher or "alternative" L-numbers; but can sometimes be used to describe the same species or type from another locality.

L-number	Alternative L- or LDA-numbers	Scientific name	Common name(s)
L001	L022	Pterygoplichthys joselimaianus	Gold spot pleco, Marbled sailfin pleco
L002	L074	Peckoltia vermiculata	Tiger peckoltia
L003		Baryancistrus sp.	Kieser pleco
L004	L005, L028, L073	Hypancistrus sp.	Angelicus pleco, Zebra pleco
L005	L004, L028, L073	Hypancistrus sp.	Angelicus pleco, Zebra pleco
L006		Peckoltia oligospila	Brown Dot Peckoltia
L007		Leporacanthicus cf. galaxias	Galaxy pleco, Tusken pleco, Vampire pleco
L008		Peckoltia sp.	Leopard Peckoltia
L009		Peckoltia sp.	Smoky Peckoltia
L010		Loricaria birindellii	Xingu Lipbrooder
L010a		Rineloricaria sp.	Red Lizard Catfish, Red Whiptail Catfish
L011	L035, L108, L116	Aphanotorulus emarginatus	Thresher pleco, Red fin thresher pleco
L012	L013	Ancistomus feldbergae	Gainsboro Pleco, Orange-fin Xingu pleco
L013	L012	Ancistomus feldbergae	Gainsboro Pleco, Orange-fin Xingu pleco
L014		Scobinancistrus aureatus	Goldie Pleco, Sunshine Pleco
L015		Peckoltia vittata	Candy stripe pleco
L016	L030, L315	Spectracanthicus punctatissimus	Bluespotted Pleco
L017		Hopliancistrus wolverine	Wolverine Pleco
L018	L081, L085, L177; LDA60, LDA116, LDA117	Baryancistrus xanthellus	Gold nugget pleco
L019		Baryancistrus sp.	
L020		Spectracanthicus zuanoni	
L021	L023	Pterygoplichthys pardalis	Common pleco
L022	L001	Pterygoplichthys joselimaianus	
L023	L021	Pterygoplichthys pardalis	Common pleco
L024	LDA118	Pseudacanthicus pitanga	Flame pleco, Red fin cactus pleco
L025		Pseudacanthicus pirarara	Scarlet pleco
L026		Baryancistrus niveatus	
L027b	LDA107	Panaque cf. armbrusteri 'teles pires'	Olive royal pleco, Teles Pires royal pleco
L027 Tapajos	LDA77	Panaque armbrusteri	Tapajos royal pleco, Golden line royal pleco
L027 Tocantins		Panaque cf. armbrusteri 'tocantins'	Tocantins royal pleco, Platinum royal pleco
L027 Xingu	L027a, LDA63	Panaque cf. armbrusteri 'xingu'	Xingu royal pleco, Longnosed royal pleco, Red Fin Royal Pleco
L028	L004, L005, L073	Hypancistrus sp.	Angelicus pleco
L029		Leporacanthicus galaxias	Galaxy pleco, Tusken pleco, Vampire pleco
L030	L016, L315	Spectracanthicus punctatissimus	Bluespotted Pleco
L031	L176, L300, LDA04	Parancistrus nudiventris	Peppermint pleco
L032		Ancistrus aguaboensis	
L033		Lasiancistrus sp.	
L034		Ancistrus ranunculus	Medusa pleco
L035	L011, L108, L116	Aphanotorulus emarginatus	Thresher pleco, Red fin thresher pleco
L036		Ancistomus spilomma	
L037	L037a	Hypostomus faveolus	Honeycomb Pleco
L038		Peckoltia sp.	
L039		Guyanancistrus niger	Black Wing Pleco
L040		Harttia surinamensis	
L041		Guyanancistrus brevispinis	Shortspined Wing Pleco
L042		Rineloricaria cf. platyura	Pearlscale whiptail
L043		Ancistrus sp.	
L044		Paralithoxus planquettei	Green broad lip pleco
L045		Ancistrus sp.	
L046	L098	Hypancistrus zebra	Zebra pleco
L047		Baryancistrus chrysolomus	Magnum pleco, Mango pleco
L048		Scobinancistrus cf. pariolispos	Golden cloud pleco
L049		Peckoltia multispinis	
L050		Hypostomus cf. cochliodon	Spotted Cochliodon, Spotted Humpbacked Pleco
L051	L281	Hypostomus latifrons	Paraguay Pleco
L052		Dekeyseria sp.	Butterfly pleco, Flounder pleco
L053		Harttia sp.	
L054		Hypostomus sp.	
L055		Peckoltia sp.	
L056		Pseudancistrus sp.	Rubber pleco, Black Gudgeon Pleco
L057		Baryancistrus sp.	
L059		Ancistrus hoplogenys	Orange spotted bristlenose
L060		Hypostomus cf. nematopterus	
L061		Peckoltia sp.	
L063		Pseudacanthicus cf. serratus	Brown finned Cactus Pleco
L064		Pseudacanthicus sp.	Broad tail Cactus Pleco
L065		Pseudacanthicus sp.	Blizzard Cactus Pleco, Mustang Cactus Pleco
L066		Hypancistrus sp.	King tiger pleco, Scribbled pleco, Network pleco
L067		Pseudancistrus asurini	Yellowspotted Stream Pleco
L068		Ancistrini sp.	Cotton Spotted Pleco
L069		Ancistrini sp.	Orange Black Pleco
L070		Hypancistrus sp.	Zombie pleco
L071	L181, L249	Ancistrus sp.	
L072		Peckoltia sp.	
L073	L004, L005, L028	Hypancistrus sp.	Angelicus pleco
L074	L002	Peckoltia vermiculata	Tiger peckoltia
L075	L124, L301, LDA02	Peckoltia sabaji	Para Pleco
L076		Peckoltia sp.	Orange seam pleco
L077		Hypostomus sp.	Bruno pleco, Rusty pleco, Violet pleco
L078		Hypostomus sp.	
L079		Pseudacanthicus sp.	
L080		Peckoltia sp.	
L081	L018, L085, L177; LDA60, LDA116, LDA117	Baryancistrus xanthellus	Gold nugget pleco
L082		Ancistrini sp.	Opal spot pleco, Polka-dot cigar pleco
L083		Pterygoplichthys xinguensis	
L084		Baryancistrus sp.	
L085	L018, L081, L177; LDA60, LDA116, LDA117	Baryancistrus xanthellus	Gold nugget pleco
L086	LDA14	Spectracanthicus tocantinensis	Spotted Maraba pleco
L087		Hypostomus sp.	
L088		Ancistrus sp.	
L089		Ancistrus sp.	
L090		Panaque bathyphilus	Papa Panaque
L091		Leporacanthicus triactis	Three beacon pleco
L092	L194	Lasiancistrus tentaculatus	Woodeating Lasiancistrus
L093	L153, L195	Isorineloricaria villarsi	Blue fin thresher pleco
L094	L123	Aphanotorulus ammophilus	Cute pleco, Black spotted pleco
L095		Pseudorinelepis genibarbis	Orange Cheek Pinecone Pleco
L096	L160	Pseudacanthicus spinosus	Coffee & cream pleco, Spiny monster pleco
L097		Pseudacanthicus sp.	Polka dot cactus pleco
L098	L046	Hypancistrus zebra	Zebra pleco
L099		Peckoltia sp.	
L100	LDA75	Ancistrus sp.	
L101		Hypostomus sp.	
L102		Hypancistrus inspector	Snowball pleco
L103		Peckoltia sp.	
L104	L162, LDA22	Panaque maccus	Clown Pleco
L105		Panaque sp.	
L106		Hemiancistrus guahiborum	Spotted orange seam pleco
L107	L184	Ancistrus sp.	Brilliant bristlenose pleco
L108	L011, L035, L116	Aphanotorulus emarginatus	Thresher pleco, Red fin thresher pleco
L109		Aphanotorulus cf. unicolor	Ecuador Pleco
L110	L157	Ancistrus sp.	Red spot bristlenose
L111		Ancistrus sp.	
L112		Hypostomus sp.	
L113	L234	Megalancistrus parananus	
L114	LDA07	Pseudacanthicus sp.	Leopard cactus pleco
L115	L248	Baryancistrus sp.	Mega Snowball pleco
L116	L011, L035, L108	Aphanotorulus emarginatus	Thresher pleco, Red fin thresher pleco
L117		Hypostomus sp.	
L118		Hypostomus sp.	
L119		Hypostomus sp.	
L120	L182	Ancistrus sp.	Starlight bristlenose pleco
L121	L135, L305	Peckoltia braueri	Worm line peckoltia
L122		Pseudancistrus sp.	Spotted orange seam pleco
L123	L094	Aphanotorulus ammophilus	Cute pleco, Black spotted pleco
L124	L075, L301, LDA02	Peckoltia sabaji	Para Pleco
L125	L150	Ancistrus sp.	
L126		Lithoxancistrus orinoco	Large Snouted Pleco
L127	L207	Ancistrini sp.	
L128		Hemiancistrus sp.	Blue phantom pleco
L129		Hypancistrus debilittera	Colombian zebra pleco
L130		Hypostomus sp.	
L131		Hypostomus sp.	
L132		Hypostomus sp.	
L133		Scobinancistrus pariolispos	Golden Cloud Pleco
L134		Peckoltia compta	Leopard frog pleco
L135	L121, L305	Peckoltia braueri	Worm line peckoltia
L136	L136a, L136b, LDA05, LDA06	Hypancistrus sp.	
L137		Hypostomus soniae	Blue eyed red fin pleco
L138		Hypostomus sp.	
L139		Hypostomus sp.	
L140	LDA61, LDA62	Peckoltia sp.	
L141	L215	Ancistomus snethlageae	Ghost pleco
L142	LDA33	Baryancistrus sp.	Big White Spot Pleco
L143		Lasiancistrus sp.	
L144		Ancistrus sp.	Black eyed yellow bristlenose
L145		Hypostomus sp.	
L146	L232, LDA30	Peckoltichthys bachi	Bola pleco
L147		Peckoltia sp.	
L148		Ancistrus sp.	
L149		Ancistrus sp.	
L150	L125	Ancistrus sp.	
L151	L216	Dekeyseria scaphirhyncha	Flat head pleco
L152		Pseudorinelepis sp.	Pineapple pleco
L153	L093, L195	Isorineloricaria villarsi	Blue fin thresher pleco
L154		Pterygoplichthys sp.	
L155		Acanthicus hystrix	Lyretail pleco
L156		Ancistrus sp.	
L157	L110	Ancistrus sp.	Red spot bristlenose
L158		Hypancistrus sp.	
L159		Ancistrus sp.	
L160	L096	Pseudacanthicus spinosus	Coffee & cream pleco, Spiny monster pleco
L161		Hypostomus faveolus	
L162	L104, LDA22	Panaque maccus	Clown Pleco
L163		Ancistomus cf. feldbergae	Big spot "Peckoltia"
L164		Pterygoplichthys sp.	Maze pleco
L165		Pterygoplichthys gibbiceps	Sailfin pleco
L166		Hypostomus sp.	
L167		Hypostomus weberi	Webers pleco
L168		Dekeyseria brachyura	Butterfly pleco, Flounder pleco
L169	LDA01	Panaque sp.	Gold Stripe Panaque
L170		Peckoltia sp.	
L171	LDA15	Hopliancistrus xikrin	Greyspotted Hook Pleco
L172	LDA33	Baryancistrus sp.	Big whitespot pleco
L173		Hypancistrus sp.	Wavy zebra pleco
L173b		Hypancistrus sp. (3)	Thinstriped zebra pleco
L174		Hypancistrus sp.	Spotted zebra pleco
L175		Spectracanthicus sp.	
L176	L031, L300, LDA04	Parancistrus nudiventris	Peppermint pleco
L177	L018, L081, L085; LDA60, LDA116, LDA117	Baryancistrus xanthellus	Iriri gold nugget pleco
L178		Lasiancistrus sp.	Red fin Lasiancistrus
L179		Pseudacanthicus sp.	
L180		Ancistrus sp.	
L181	L071, L249	Ancistrus sp.	
L182	L120	Ancistrus sp.	Starlight bristlenose pleco
L183		Ancistrus dolichopterus	Starlight bristlenose catfish
L184	L107	Ancistrus sp.	Brilliant bristlenose pleco
L185		Pseudacanthicus sp.	
L186		Pseudacanthicus sp.	
L187		Chaetostoma dorsale	Blackfinned Rubbernose Pleco
L187		Chaetostoma pearsei	Pears' Rubbernose Pleco
L187		Chaetostoma sp. 'rio zuata(orinoco)'	White spot rubbernose pleco
L187b	L444	Chaetostoma formosae	Blonde rubbernose bulldog pleco
L188		Chaetostoma nudirostre	Light rubbernose pleco
L189		Pseudolithoxus kelsorum	Banded Pancake Pleco
L190		Panaque nigrolineatus	Royal pleco
L191		Panaque sp.	Dull Eyed Royal pleco
L192		Hypostomus sp.	
L193		Acanthicus sp.	Velour Pleco
L194	L092	Lasiancistrus tentaculatus	Woodeating Lasiancistrus
L195	L093, L153	Isorineloricaria villarsi	Blue fin thresher pleco
L196		Pterygoplichthys lituratus	Fatamorgana Pleco
L197		Spectracanthicus cf. immaculatus	Non Spot Pleco
L198		Ancistrini sp.	Copper plec
L199		Hypancistrus furunculus	
L200		Baryancistrus demantoides	Hi Fin Green Phantom Pleco
L200		Hemiancistrus subviridis	Green phantom pleco, Lemon spotted green pleco
L201		Hypancistrus contradens	Columbian Snowball pleco
L202	LDA57, LDA79	Peckoltia lineola	Shortlined pleco
L203	LDA65	Panaque schaeferi	Titanic pleco, Volkswagen pleco
L204		Panaqolus albivermis	Flash pleco
L205		Peckoltia sp.	
L206		Panaque sp.	
L207	L127	Ancistrini sp.	
L208		Ancistrini sp.	
L209		Peckoltia sp.	
L210		Ancistrini sp.	
L211	L295	Peckoltia sp.	
L212		Hopliancistrus tricornis	Hooked Pleco
L213		Ancistrus sp.	
L214		Peckoltia sp.	
L215	L141	Ancistomus snethlageae	Ghost pleco
L216	L151	Dekeyseria scaphirhyncha	Flat head pleco
L217		Paralithoxus sp.	Spotted baleen pleco
L218	L247	Peckoltia sp.	
L219		Baryancistrus hadrostomus	
L220		Pseudancistrus sp.	Lemonspotted Pleco
L221	L223	Pseudancistrus sp.	Green Flathead Pleco
L222		Hypostomus sp.	
L223	L221	Pseudancistrus sp.	
L224		Hypostomus sp.	
L226	LDA26	Panaqolus changae	Iquitos tiger pleco
L227		Hypostomus sp.	
L228		Lasiancistrus sp.	
L229		Hypostomus sp.	
L232	L146, LDA30	Peckoltichthys bachi	Bola pleco
L233	LDA09	Hypostomus fuscomaculatus	
L234	L113	Megalancistrus parananus	
L235		Pseudolithoxus anthrax	Flyer cat
L236		Hypancistrus sp.	
L237		Ancistrus sp.	
L238	LDA40	Delturus sp.	Brook pleco
L239		Baryancistrus beggini	Blue fin Panaque
L240		Leporacanthicus cf. galaxias	
L241		Leporacanthicus cf. galaxias	
L242		Hypostomus sp.	
L243	LDA86	Peckoltia wernekei	Orange tiger pleco
L244		Pseudolithoxus dumus	Black Spotted Orinoco-Ancistrus
L245		Hypostomus sp.	
L246		Hypostomus sp.	
L247	L218	Peckoltia sp.	
L249	L071, L181	Ancistrus sp.	
L250		Hypancistrus sp.	
L251		Pseudancistrus sp.	Peach Spotted Pleco
L252		Ancistrini sp.	
L253		Scobinancistrus sp.	Thousand Spots Pleco
L254		Spectracanthicus sp.	
L255		Ancistrus sp.	Spotted medusa pleco
L256		Paralithoxus sp.	Dotted snake pleco
L257		Pseudolithoxus tigris	
L258		Parancistrus sp.	
L259	LDA32	Pseudancistrus sp.	Yellow Seam Stream Pleco
L260		Hypancistrus sp.	Queen Arabesque pleco
L261		Colossimystax pectegenitor	Longspined stream leco
L262		Hypancistrus sp.	
L263		Leporacanthicus sp.	
L264		Leporacanthicus joselimai	Sultan pleco
L265	LDA84	Peckoltia sp.	
L266		Hypostomus sp.	
L267		Ancistrus sp.	
L268		Ancistrini sp.	
L269		Spectracanthicus immaculatus	Non Spot Rodent Pleco
L270	L307, LDA76	Hypancistrus sp.	Chocolate zebra pleco, Tapajos zebra pleco
L271		Panaque sp.	
L272		Panaque sp.	
L273		Pseudacanthicus sp.	Titanicus pleco
L274		Baryancistrus sp.	
L275		Pseudacanthicus sp.	Tailstriped Cactus Pleco
L276		Chaetostoma aff. lineopunctatum	Bloodfin Bulldog Pleco
L277		Chaetostoma sp.	Roundhead Rubbernose plec
L278		Peckoltia sp.	Apure Tiger Pleco
L279	LDA58	Ancistrus sp.	
L280		Ancistrini sp.	
L281	L051	Hypostomus latifrons	Paraguay Pleco
L282		Pseudacanthicus sp.	King galaxy cactus pleco
L283		Pseudacanthicus sp.	
L284		Hypostomus sp.	
L285		Hypostomus sp.	
L286		Hypostomus sp.	
L287		Hypancistrus sp.	
L288		Peckoltia sp.	
L289		Ancistrus sp.	
L290	L291	Aphanotorulus horridus	
L291	L290	Aphanotorulus horridus	
L292		Ancistrus sp.	
L293		Ancistrus sp.	
L294		Leporacanthicus cf. galaxias	
L295	L211	Peckoltia sp.	
L296		Panaque sp.	
L297		Hypancistrus sp.	
L298		Hypostomus sp.	
L299		Pseudancistrus nigrescens	Headspotted Stream Pleco
L300	L031, L176, LDA04	Parancistrus nudiventris	Peppermint pleco
L301	L075, L124, LDA02	Peckoltia sabaji	Para Pleco
L302		Lasiancistrus sp.	
L303		Hypostomus macushi	
L304		Ancistrus sp.	
L305	L121, L135	Peckoltia braueri	Worm line peckoltia
L306	LDA64	Panaque sp.	
L307	L270, LDA76	Hypancistrus sp.	Chocolate zebra pleco, Tapajos zebra pleco
L308		Hypostomus sp.	
L309		Ancistrus sp.	
L310	LDA51	Hypostomus cochliodon	
L311		Hypostomus sp.	
L312	LDA71	Lasiancistrus cf. caucanus	
L313		Pterygoplichthys sp.	
L314	LDA56	Leporacanthicus sp.	Sultan pleco
L315	L016, L030	Spectracanthicus punctatissimus	Bluespotted Pleco
L316		Hypancistrus sp.	Jari zebra pleco
L317		Guyanancistrus sp.	Spotted Jari Pleco
L318		Hypancistrus sp.	
L319		Baryancistrus sp.	
L320		Pseudacanthicus sp.	
L321		Pseudancistrus zawadzkii	Tapajos Stream Pleco
L322		Lasiancistrus saetiger	
L323		Baryancistrus sp.	
L324		Baryancistrus sp.	
L325		Ancistrus sp.	
L326		Leporacanthicus sp.	
L327		Ancistrus sp.	
L328		Pseudolithoxus sp.	Greenspotted Plane Pleco
L329	LDA27, LDA28	Panaque sp.	Panaque Peru Orange Lyretail
L330		Panaque nigrolineatus laurafabianae	Watermelon pleco
L331		Hypostomus sp.	
L332		Parancistrus sp.	
L333		Hypancistrus seideli	King Tiger pleco
L337		Lasiancistrus sp.	
L338	LDA16	Ancistrus sp.	
L339		Hypancistrus lunaorum	
L340		Hypancistrus sp.	Mega clown pleco
L341		Panaque sp.	
L342		Hypostomus sp.	
L343		Pseudacanthicus sp.	
L344		Ancistrus sp.	
L345		Hypancistrus sp.	
L346		Hypostomus sp.	
L347		Pterygoplichthys sp.	
L349	LDA45	Ancistrus sp.	
L350		Peckoltia pankimpuju	Coal pleco, Peruvian lyre-tail
L351		Panaque sp.	
L352		Ancistrus sp.	
L353		Spectracanthicus sp.	Night Sky Pleco
L354		Spectracanthicus cf. zuanoni	Brick Pleco
L355		Ancistrus sp.	
L356		Hypostomus sp.	
L357		Ancistrus sp.	
L358		Peckoltia sp.	
L359		Ancistrus sp.	
L360		Hypostomus sp.	
L361		Hopliancistrus munduruku	Spotted Hook Pleco
L362		Scobinancistrus sp.	Spotted Sawdust Pleco
L363		Spectracanthicus sp.	
L364		Baryancistrus sp.	
L365		Lasiancistrus sp.	
L366		Hypostomus sp.	
L367		Hypostomus sp.	
L368		Scobinancistrus sp.	Moon pleco
L369		Ancistrus sp.	
L370		Ancistrus sp.	
L371		Ancistrus sp.	Orange Fin Bristlenose
L372		Ancistrus sp.	Slate Bristlenose plec
L373		Spectracanthicus sp.	
L374		Panaque sp.	
L375		Pseudacanthicus cf. spinosus	
L376		Ancistrini sp.	
L377		Peckoltia sp.	
L378		Ancistrus sp.	
L379		Hypostomus sp.	
L380		Pseudacanthicus sp.	
L381		Hypostomus sp.	
L382		Peckoltia sp.	
L383		Pseudancistrus sp.	Trombetas Stream Pleco
L384		Baryancistrus sp.	
L385	L492	Pseudolithoxus kinja	Green Flyer Pleco
L386		Lasiancistrus sp.	
L387		Peckoltia sp.	Tangerine Tiger Pleco
L388		Hypostomus sp.	
L389		Hypostomus sp.	
L390		Hypostomus sp.	
L391		Spectracanthicus sp.	Starry Sky Pleco
L392		Ancistrus sp.	
L393		Ancistrus sp.	
L394		Hypostomus sp.	
L395		Panaque sp.	
L396		Ancistrus sp.	
L397		Panaqolus sp.	Tangerine tiger pleco
L398		Panaqolus tankei	Tanke tiger pleco
L399		Hypancistrus sp.	Elegant Zebra Pleco
L400		Hypancistrus sp.	
L401		Hypancistrus sp.	
L403		Panaque sp.	
L404		Hypancistrus sp.	
L405		Peckoltia sp.	
L406		Pseudacanthicus sp.	
L407		Acanthicus sp.	Branco Giant Pleco
L408		Chaetostoma sp.	
L409		Chaetostoma sp.	
L410		Hypancistrus sp.	
L411		Hypancistrus sp.	
L412		Chaetostoma sp.	
L413		Chaetostoma sp.	
L414		Chaetostoma sp.	
L415		Chaetostoma sp.	
L416		Chaetostoma sp.	
L417		Oligancistrus sp.	
L418		Panaque titan	Shampupa Royal Pleco
L419		Hypostomus sp.	
L420		Pseudacanthicus sp.	
L421		Ancistrus sp.	
L422		Hopliancistrus sp.	Central Hook Pleco
L423		Ancistrus sp.	
L424		Hemiancistrus sp.	
L425		Panaque sp.	
L426		Panaque sp.	
L427		Pseudacanthicus sp.	Jatupu Cactus Pleco
L428		Hypancistrus sp.	Curua Zebra Pleco
L429		Hypancistrus sp.	Jatupu Angel Pleco
L430		Ancistomus sp.	Postbox Pleco
L431		Paralithoxus sp.	Jatupu Toad Pleco
L432		Paralithoxus sp.	Curuá Toad Pleco
L433		Paralithoxus sp.	Maicuru Toad Pleco
L434		Paralithoxus sp.	Jauaru Toad Pleco
L435		Paralithoxus cf. raso	Araguari Toad Pleco
L436		Pseudancistrus sp.	Maicuru Stream Pleco
L437		Pseudancistrus sp.	Curuá Stream Pleco
L438		Pseudancistrus sp.	Branco Stream Pleco
L439		Pseudancistrus sp.	Leaf Stream Pleco
L440		Pseudancistrus sp.	Tile Pleco
L488		Panaque cf. nigrolineatus 'aripuana'	Beige Royal Pleco
L489		Hypancistrus sp.	Jatapu Angel Pleco
L490		Guyanancistrus sp.	Fat Head Pleco
L491		Pseudancistrus sp.	Jauperi Stream Pleco
L492	L385	Pseudolithoxus kinja	Green Flyer Pleco
L493		Peckoltia sp.	Freckled Tiger Pleco
L494		Peckoltia sp.	Paru Tiger Pleco
L495		Peckoltia sp.	Maicuru Tiger Pleco
L600	LDA73	Pseudacanthicus leopardus	Leopard Cactus Pleco
	LDA43	Guyanancistrus cf. brevispinis	Measles Pleco
	LDA74	Ancistrus macrophthalmus	Blue Medusa Pleco
	LDA106	Panaque sp.	Golden Royal Pleco, Xingu Golden Thunder Pleco, Xingu Longnose Royal Pleco
