= Spectracanthicus zuanoni =

Scientific classification
- Kingdom: Animalia
- Phylum: Chordata
- Class: Actinopterygii
- Division: Teleostei
- Order: Siluriformes
- Family: Loricariidae
- Genus: Spectracanthicus
- Species: S. zuanoni

Binomial name
- Spectracanthicus zuanoni Chamon & Rapp Py-Daniel, 2014

Species of catfish

Spectracanthicus zuanoni is a species of freshwater ray-finned fish belonging to the family Loricariidae, the suckermouth armoured catfishes, and the subfamily Hypostominae, the suckermouth catfishes. This catfish is endemic to Brazil where it occurs in the Xingu River basin in the state of Pará. It is usually found in areas up to 2 m (7 ft) deep with strong currents and rocky substrates, where it is often seen hiding beneath rocks. It is known to occur individually or in groups of three, with juveniles being found alongside other loricariid species, such as Ancistrus ranunculus, Baryancistrus xanthellus, Hopliancistrus tricornis, Parancistrus nudiventris, Peckoltia vittata, and its congener Spectracanthicus punctatissimus.

S. zuanoni is nocturnal, feeding actively on algae and periphyton at night. This species reaches a standard length of 12.9 cm (5.1 in). The specific name, zuanoni, refers to Jansen Alfredo Sampaio Zuanon, in recognition of his contributions to the field of Neotropical ichthyology and that he was the first ichthyologist to collect the species. S. zuanoni appears in the aquarium trade, where it is usually referred to either as the acari bola branca or by its associated L-number, which is L-020.
