= Hypostomus arecuta =

Scientific classification
- Kingdom: Animalia
- Phylum: Chordata
- Class: Actinopterygii
- Division: Teleostei
- Order: Siluriformes
- Family: Loricariidae
- Genus: Hypostomus
- Species: H. arecuta

Binomial name
- Hypostomus arecuta Y. P. Cardoso, Almirón, Casciotta, Aichino, Lizarralde & Montoya-Burgos, 2012

Species of fish

Hypostomus arecuta is a species of freshwater ray-finned fish belonging to the family Loricariidae, the suckermouth armored catfishes, and the subfamily Hypostominae, the suckermouth catfishes. This catfish occurs in the Paraná River in Argentina.

H. arecuta is typically found in coastal areas of the main river channel, in areas with a high oxygen concentration, moderate currents (around 0.6 m/s) and substrates composed of sand, pebbles, and large sandstone boulders. The water in which H. arecuta occurs is reported to usually have a transparency of 1.5 to 2.4 m (possibly referring to visibility) and a conductivity of 50.9 to 59.6 μS/cm.

H. arecuta reaches 24.3 cm (9.6 inches) SL and is believed to be a facultative air-breather. It is known to be sympatric with multiple other Hypostomus species, including H. commersoni, H. cochliodon, H. uruguayensis, H. latifrons, H. ternetzi, H. luteomaculatus, H. microstomus, and H. boulengeri. Its specific epithet, arecuta, derives from the Guarani word arecutá, which means "loricariid fish".
