= Hypostomus peckoltoides =

Scientific classification
- Kingdom: Animalia
- Phylum: Chordata
- Class: Actinopterygii
- Order: Siluriformes
- Family: Loricariidae
- Genus: Hypostomus
- Species: H. peckoltoides

Binomial name
- Hypostomus peckoltoides Zawadzki, Weber & Pavanelli, 2010

Species of catfish

Hypostomus peckoltoides is a species of catfish in the family Loricariidae. It is native to South America, where it occurs in the Cuiabá River in the upper Paraguay River basin in Brazil. It is typically found in environments with turbid water, a substrate composed of rocks and sand, and various types of riparian vegetation. It is known to be syntopic with other species of Hypostomus, including H. boulengeri, H. cochliodon, H. latifrons, H. latirostris, and H. regani.

Hypostomus peckoltoides reaches at least 11.1 cm (4.4 inches) in standard length, with some sources reporting a maximum length of 30 cm (11.8 inches), and it is believed to be a facultative air-breather. Its specific epithet, peckoltoides, refers to the visual similarity between the species and some members of the genus Peckoltia, with both sporting dark saddle-like patterns.

Hypostomus peckoltoides appears in the aquarium trade, where it is typically referred to either as the giraffe pleco or by its associated L-number, which is L-390.
