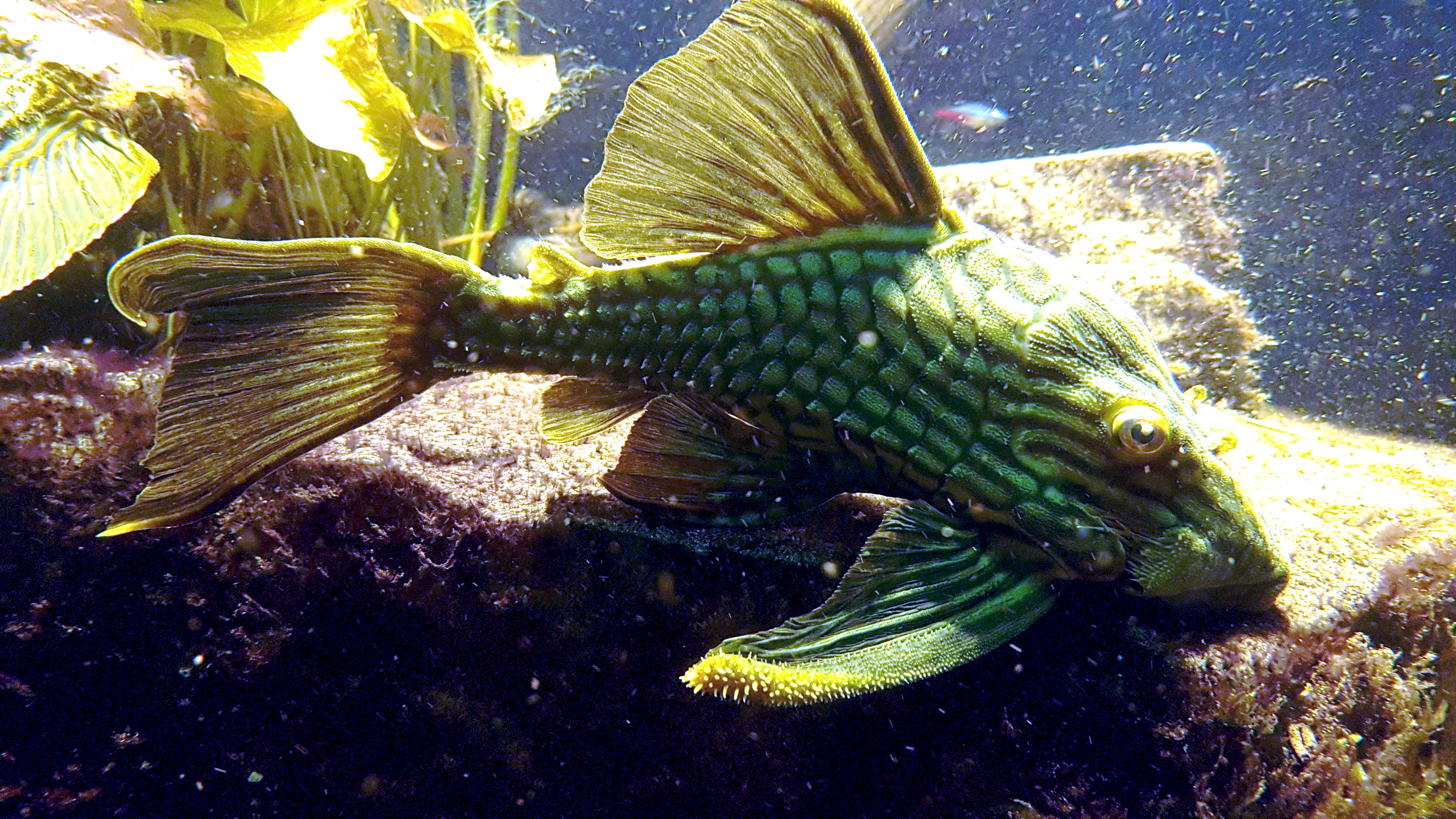

Conservation status
- Least Concern (IUCN 3.1)

Scientific classification
- Kingdom: Animalia
- Phylum: Chordata
- Class: Actinopterygii
- Order: Siluriformes
- Family: Loricariidae
- Subfamily: Hypostominae
- Genus: Panaque
- Species: P. armbrusteri

Binomial name
- Panaque armbrusteri Lujan, Hidalgo & Stewart, 2010

= Panaque armbrusteri =

Species of fish

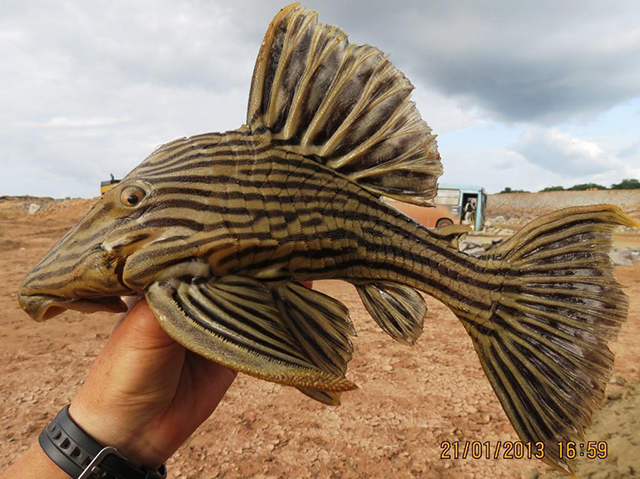
An individual of P. armbrusteri removed from water.

Panaque armbrusteri is a species of fish in the South American armoured catfish family Loricariidae. This species is distributed throughout the Tapajós river, a large tributary of the Amazon River, with similar populations found in the Xingu, Araguaia, Tocantins and Aripuanã rivers, although it is uncertain whether these populations comprise the same or different species. P. armbrusteri is a large loricariid, reaching 43 cm (17 in) in total length and reportedly weighing up to 1.3 kg (2.9 lb).

It is a fairly popular loricariid species in the aquarium trade, and is one of the species commonly referred to as a royal pleco, although that name more frequently refers to the related species Panaque nigrolineatus. P. armbrusteri is also sometimes known by one of two L-numbers associated with it, which are L-027 and LDA-077.
