= Hypostomus kuarup =

Conservation status
- Least Concern (IUCN 3.1)

Scientific classification
- Kingdom: Animalia
- Phylum: Chordata
- Class: Actinopterygii
- Order: Siluriformes
- Family: Loricariidae
- Genus: Hypostomus
- Species: H. kuarup

Binomial name
- Hypostomus kuarup Zawadzki, Birindelli & Lima, 2012

Species of fish

Hypostomus kuarup is a species of catfish in the family Loricariidae. It is native to South America, where it occurs in the Culuene River in the Xingu River basin in the state of Mato Grosso in Brazil. It is typically found in rapids within its range, although the type locality of the species has subsequently dried out due to the construction of a nearby dam. Despite this, it is still known to inhabit rapids above and below the dammed area, as well as a fish ladder built near the type locality. It is sympatric with its congener Hypostomus faveolus.

H. kuarup reaches 21.8 cm (8.6 inches) SL and is believed to be a facultative air-breather. Its specific epithet, kuarup, refers to the Xingu ritual known as the Quarup, which is said to have originally taken place at the Cachoeira do Adelino, one of the locations in which H. kuarup can be found.

H. kuarup is sometimes known either as the Culuene pleco or by its associated L-number, which is LDA-080.
