= Spectracanthicus javae =

Scientific classification
- Kingdom: Animalia
- Phylum: Chordata
- Class: Actinopterygii
- Division: Teleostei
- Order: Siluriformes
- Family: Loricariidae
- Genus: Spectracanthicus
- Species: S. javae

Binomial name
- Spectracanthicus javae Chamon, Pereira, Mendonça & Akama, 2018

Species of catfish

Spectracanthicus javae is a species of freshwater ray-finned fish belonging to the family Loricariidae, the suckermouth armoured catfishes, and the subfamily Hypostominae, the suckermouth catfishes. This catfish is only known from rocky areas near the Javaés River in the Araguaia River system, near Praia da Sambaíba and the confluence with the Araguaia River, at Bananal Island. The holotype had a standard length of 73.3 mm (2.89 in). The specific name, javae, refers to the Javaé people, a subgroup of the Karajá who live along the Javaés River in the Brazilian state of Tocantins.
