= Ancistomus micrommatos =

Scientific classification
- Kingdom: Animalia
- Phylum: Chordata
- Class: Actinopterygii
- Order: Siluriformes
- Family: Loricariidae
- Genus: Ancistomus
- Species: A. micrommatos

Binomial name
- Ancistomus micrommatos (Cardoso & Lucinda, 2003)

Synonyms
- Hemiancistrus micrommatos

Species of catfish

Ancistomus micrommatos is a species of catfish in the family Loricariidae. It is a freshwater fish native to South America, where it is known only from the Tocantins River basin in Brazil. The species reaches 11.9 cm (4.7 inches) in standard length. Although originally described as a species of Hemiancistrus in 2003, a 2015 review conducted by Jonathan W. Armbruster (of Auburn University), David C. Werneke, and Milton Tan listed the species as valid within Ancistomus. The same review also reported that no characteristics were found to separate A. micrommatos from its congeners A. spilomma and A. spinosissimus, indicating that the three may actually all be the same species.
