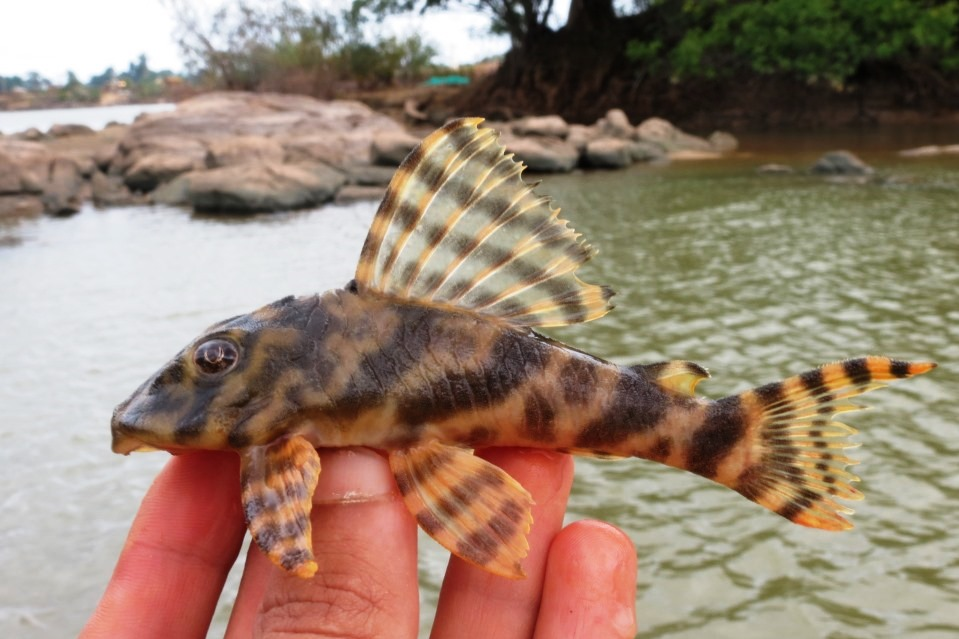

Conservation status
- Least Concern (IUCN 3.1)

Scientific classification
- Kingdom: Animalia
- Phylum: Chordata
- Class: Actinopterygii
- Division: Teleostei
- Order: Siluriformes
- Family: Loricariidae
- Subfamily: Hypostominae
- Genus: Peckoltia
- Species: P. vittata

Binomial name
- Peckoltia vittata (Steindachner, 1881)

Synonyms<"ref name = "Cof genus"/>
- Chaetostomus vittatus Steindachner, 1881; Peckoltichthys kuhlmanni Miranda Ribeiro, 1920; Peckoltia kuhlmanni (Miranda Ribeiro, 1920)

= Peckoltia vittata =

Species of fish

Peckoltia vittata is a species of freshwater ray-finned fish belonging to the family Loricariidae, the suckermouth armoured catfishes, and the subfamily Hypostominae, the suckermouth catfishes. This catfish is widely distributed in the Amazon basin of South America.

== Description ==
P. vittata reaches a maximum total length of 15 cm (5.9 in). The distinctive striped patterning sported by the species has led to it being referred to as the candy-striped pleco or the tiger pleco in the aquarium trade, although it may also be referred to by its L-number, which is L-015.

Males can be distinguished from females by the presence of small teeth-like projections or odontodes along the back half of its body.

== Distribution ==
P. vittata is native to South America, where it occurs in the Amazon basin. It can be found in the Amazon River itself, in addition to the Tapajós, the Madeira River, the Xingu River, the Uatumã River, the Trombetas River, the Capim River, and the Maranhão River. The species has also been reported from the Guaviare River of Colombia, although this is an unconfirmed occurrence.

== Ecology ==
P. vittata is most frequently observed in rocky areas. It is known to be a nocturnal species that feeds on algae.

== In the aquarium ==
P. vittata is a popular aquarium fish and requires a tropical softwater tank with a temperature of 22 to 26 °C (72 to 79 °F) and a pH of around 6. It is often confused with the species Panaqolus maccus. Keeping the species in groups of at least 5, in an aquarium of at least 80 cm (31.5 in) is recommended.
