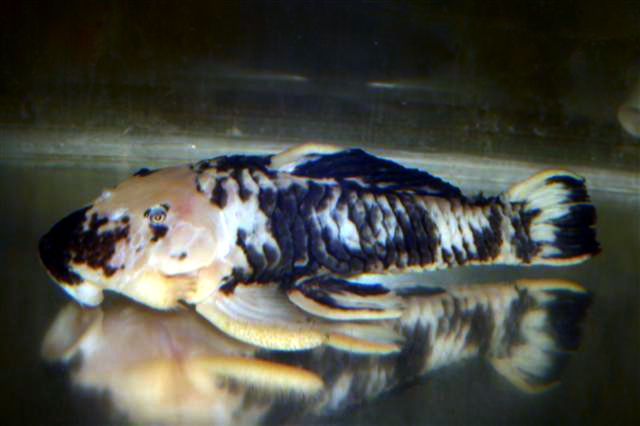

Conservation status
- Near Threatened (IUCN 3.1)

Scientific classification
- Kingdom: Animalia
- Phylum: Chordata
- Class: Actinopterygii
- Division: Teleostei
- Order: Siluriformes
- Family: Loricariidae
- Subfamily: Hypostominae
- Genus: Parancistrus
- Species: P. aurantiacus

Binomial name
- Parancistrus aurantiacus (Castelnau, 1855)

Synonyms
- Hypostomus aurantiacus Castelnau, 1855; Hypostomus nigricans Castelnau, 1855; Parancistrus nigricans (Castelnau, 1855); Hypostomus vicinus Castelnau, 1855; Parancistrus vicinus (Castelnau, 1855)

= Parancistrus aurantiacus =

Species of fish

Parancistrus aurantiacus is a species of freshwater ray-finned fish belonging to the family Loricariidae, the suckermouth armoured catfishes, and the subfamily Hypostominae, the suckermouth catfishes. This catfish is endemic to Brazil where it is found in the Xingu and Araguaia-Tocantins River basins in the states of Pará and Tocantins. This species reaches a standard length of 19.3 cm (7.6 in). P. aurantiacus was first formally described as Hypostomus aurantiacus in 1855 by François-Louis Laporte, comte de Castelnau with its type locality given erroneously as the Ucayali River in Peru. When Pieter Bleeker proposed the genus Parancistrus in 1862 H. aurantiacus was its only species and Bleeker designated it as the type species of the genus.
