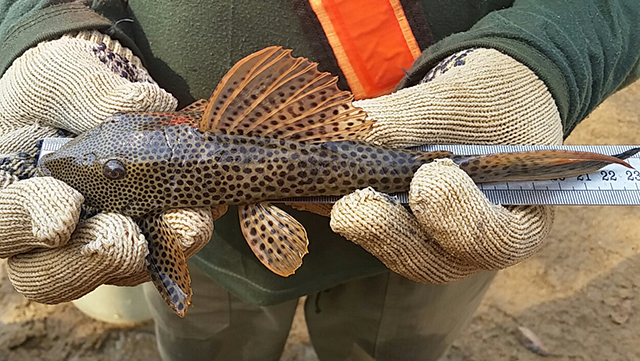

Conservation status
- Least Concern (IUCN 3.1)

Scientific classification
- Kingdom: Animalia
- Phylum: Chordata
- Class: Actinopterygii
- Division: Teleostei
- Order: Siluriformes
- Family: Loricariidae
- Genus: Aphanotorulus
- Species: A. emarginatus

Binomial name
- Aphanotorulus emarginatus (Valenciennes, 1840)

Synonyms
- Hypostomus emarginatus Valenciennes, 1840; Plecostomus emarginatus (Valenciennes, 1840); Squaliforma emarginata (Valenciennes, 1840); Hypostoma squalinum Jardine, 1841; Hypostomus squalinus Jardine & Schomburgk, 1841; Squaliforma squalina (Jardine & Schomburgk, 1841); Plecostomus annae Steindachner, 1881; Hypostomus annae (Steindachner, 1881); Squaliforma annae (Steindachner, 1881)

= Aphanotorulus emarginatus =

Species of catfish

Aphanotorulus emarginatus is a species of benthopelagic tropical freshwater ray-finned fishes belonging to the family Loricariidae, the suckermouth armored catfishes, and the subfamily Hypostominae, the suckermouth catfishes. This catfish occurs in the Amazon River basin in Brazil, Colombia, Ecuador, Guyana, Peru, Suriname and Venezuela. This species reaches 15 cm (5.9 in) in total length. It is known to be a facultative air-breather.

A. emarginatus was originally described as Hypostomus emarginatus by Achille Valenciennes in 1840, although it was transferred to the genus Squaliforma (now considered invalid) after the genus' designation by I. J. H. Isbrücker, I. Seidel, J. Michels, E. Schraml, and A. Werner in 2001. In 2004, Jonathan W. Armbruster classified the species within Hypostomus instead of Squaliforma. In 2016, following a review of Isorineloricaria and Aphanotorulus by C. Keith Ray and Armbruster (both of Auburn University), the species was reclassified as a member of Aphanotorulus.

A. emarginatus appears in the aquarium trade, where it is typically referred to either as the red-fin thresher pleco or by one of four associated L-numbers, which are L-011, L-035, L-108, and L-116.
