= Spectracanthicus immaculatus =

Scientific classification
- Kingdom: Animalia
- Phylum: Chordata
- Class: Actinopterygii
- Division: Teleostei
- Order: Siluriformes
- Family: Loricariidae
- Genus: Spectracanthicus
- Species: S. immaculatus

Binomial name
- Spectracanthicus immaculatus Chamon & Rapp Py-Daniel, 2014

Species of catfish

Spectracanthicus immaculatus is a species of freshwater ray-finned fish belonging to the family Loricariidae, the suckermouth armoured catfishes, and the subfamily Hypostominae, the suckermouth catfishes. This catfish occurs in the Tapajós basin in Brazil. This species reaches a standard length of 8.2 cm (3.2 in). The specific name, immaculatus, is derived from a Latin word translating to "spotless", referring to the species' lack of any form of spotted patterning.

S. immaculatus appears in the aquarium trade, where it is sometimes referred to either as the non-spot rodent pleco or by its associated L-number, which is L-269.
