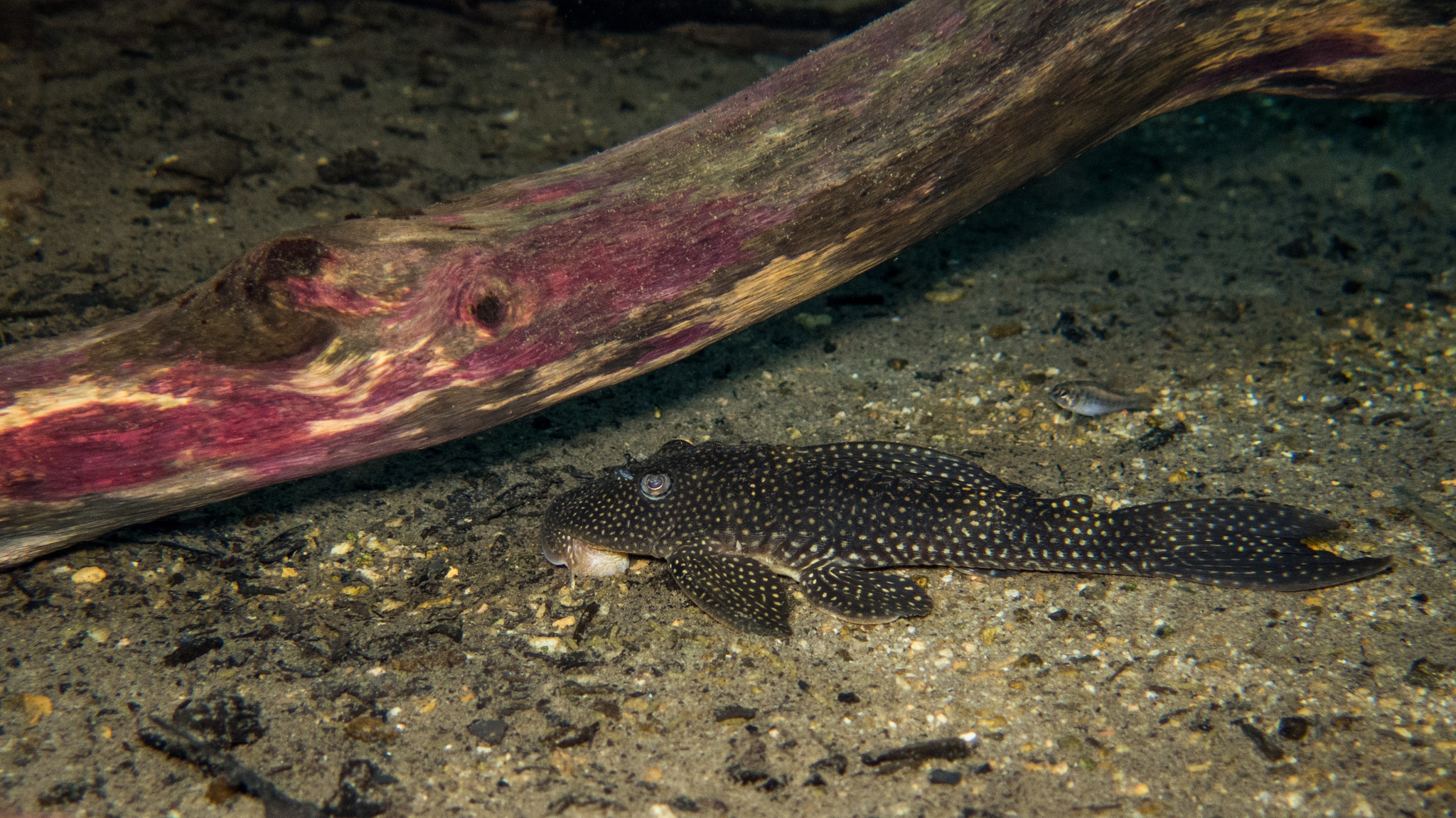

Scientific classification
- Kingdom: Animalia
- Phylum: Chordata
- Class: Actinopterygii
- Division: Teleostei
- Order: Siluriformes
- Family: Loricariidae
- Genus: Hypostomus
- Species: H. delimai

Binomial name
- Hypostomus delimai Zawadzki, R. R. de Oliveira & Debona, 2013

= Hypostomus delimai =

Species of catfish

Hypostomus delimai is a species of catfish in the family Loricariidae. It is native to South America, where it occurs in the basins of the Araguaia River and the Tocantins River in Brazil. It is typically found in areas with turbid water, riparian vegetation, and a substrate composed of rocks and sand. It is known to be sympatric with other species of Hypostomus, including H. faveolus and H. pyrineusi, as well as species of Aphanotorulus. The species reaches 25.3 cm (10 inches) in standard length and is believed to be a facultative air-breather.

Hypostomus delimai was described in 2013 by Cláudio H. Zawadzki (of the State University of Maringá), Renildo R. de Oliveira (of the National Institute of Amazonian Research), and Tiago Debona (of Western Paraná State University) on the basis of distinctive morphology and coloration.

== Etymology ==
The fish is named in honor of Flávio César Thadeo de Lima (b. 1974), of the Universidade Estadual de Campinas, because of his numerous contributions to Neotropical ichthyology.
