= Scobinancistrus raonii =

Scientific classification
- Kingdom: Animalia
- Phylum: Chordata
- Class: Actinopterygii
- Division: Teleostei
- Order: Siluriformes
- Family: Loricariidae
- Genus: Scobinancistrus
- Species: S. raonii

Binomial name
- Scobinancistrus raonii Chaves, Oliveira, Gonçalves, Sousa & Rapp Py-Daniel, 2023

Species of catfish

Scobinancistrus raonii is a species of freshwater ray-finned fish belonging to the family Loricariidae, the suckermouth armoured catfishes, and the subfamily Hypostominae, the suckermouth catfishes. This catfish is endemic to Brazil, where it occurs in the Xingu in the state of Pará. This species reaches a standard length of 13 cm (5.1 in). Its specific name honours Raoni Metuktire, a cacique of the Kayapó people and conservationist.
