= Chaetostoma lineopunctatum =

Conservation status
- Least Concern (IUCN 3.1)

Scientific classification
- Kingdom: Animalia
- Phylum: Chordata
- Class: Actinopterygii
- Order: Siluriformes
- Family: Loricariidae
- Genus: Chaetostoma
- Species: C. lineopunctatum

Binomial name
- Chaetostoma lineopunctatum C. H. Eigenmann & Allen, 1942

Synonyms
- Chaetostoma lineopunctata C. H. Eigenmann & Allen, 1942

Species of catfish

Chaetostoma lineopunctatum is a species of freshwater ray-finned fish belonging to the family Loricariidae, the suckermouth armoured catfishes, and the subfamily Hypostominae, the suckermouth catfishes. This catfish is endemic to Peru where it occurs in the Amazon basin, it has been recorded from the Aguaytía River basin, in the drainage of the Ucayali, the Urubamba River, the Tambo river basin, Mayapo River, Inambari River, the Apurimac River valley and the Marañón River. This species reaches a standard length of 14.3 cm (5.6 in). It appears in the aquarium trade, where it is referred to as the bloodfin bulldog pleco or by its L-number, which is L-276.
