= Peckoltia braueri =

Conservation status
- Least Concern (IUCN 3.1)

Scientific classification
- Kingdom: Animalia
- Phylum: Chordata
- Class: Actinopterygii
- Division: Teleostei
- Order: Siluriformes
- Family: Loricariidae
- Genus: Peckoltia
- Species: P. braueri

Binomial name
- Peckoltia braueri (Eigenmann, 1912)

Synonyms
- Hemiancistrus braueri Eigenmann, 1912

Species of catfish

Peckoltia braueri is a species of freshwater ray-finned fish belonging to the family Loricariidae, the suckermouth armoured catfishes, and the subfamily Hypostominae, the suckermouth catfishes. This catfish is found in South America, where it occurs in the basins of the Rio Negro and the Branco River in Brazil and Guyana. It is typically found among large boulders in fast-moving riffles. The species reaches 10.3 cm (4.1 inches) SL.

P. braueri appears in the aquarium trade, where it is referred to either as the worm-line peckoltia or by one of three associated L-numbers, which are L-121, L-135, and L-305.
