= Aphanotorulus ammophilus =

Conservation status
- Least Concern (IUCN 3.1)

Scientific classification
- Kingdom: Animalia
- Phylum: Chordata
- Class: Actinopterygii
- Division: Teleostei
- Order: Siluriformes
- Family: Loricariidae
- Genus: Aphanotorulus
- Species: A. ammophilus

Binomial name
- Aphanotorulus ammophilus Armbruster & Page, 1996

Species of fish

Aphanotorulus ammophilus, also known as the black spotted pleco, is a species of benthopelagic tropical freshwater ray-finned fish belonging to the family Loricariidae, the suckermouth armored catfishes, and the subfamily Hypostominae, the suckermouth catfishes. This catfish is found in Venezuela and Colombia, specifically the Río Orinoco drainage.> Due to an initial erroneous publication, A. ammophilus was initially placed into Hypostomus instead of Aphanotorulus. However, because this species shows sexual dimorphism, has a relatively flatter shape, and has a jagged posterior edge of its oral disc, it was placed in the genus Aphanotorulus. It sometimes appears in the aquarium trade, where it is known as the cute pleco, although it may be referred to by its L-numbers, L094 or L123. A. ammophilus reaches a standard length of 16.1 cm (6.3 in).
