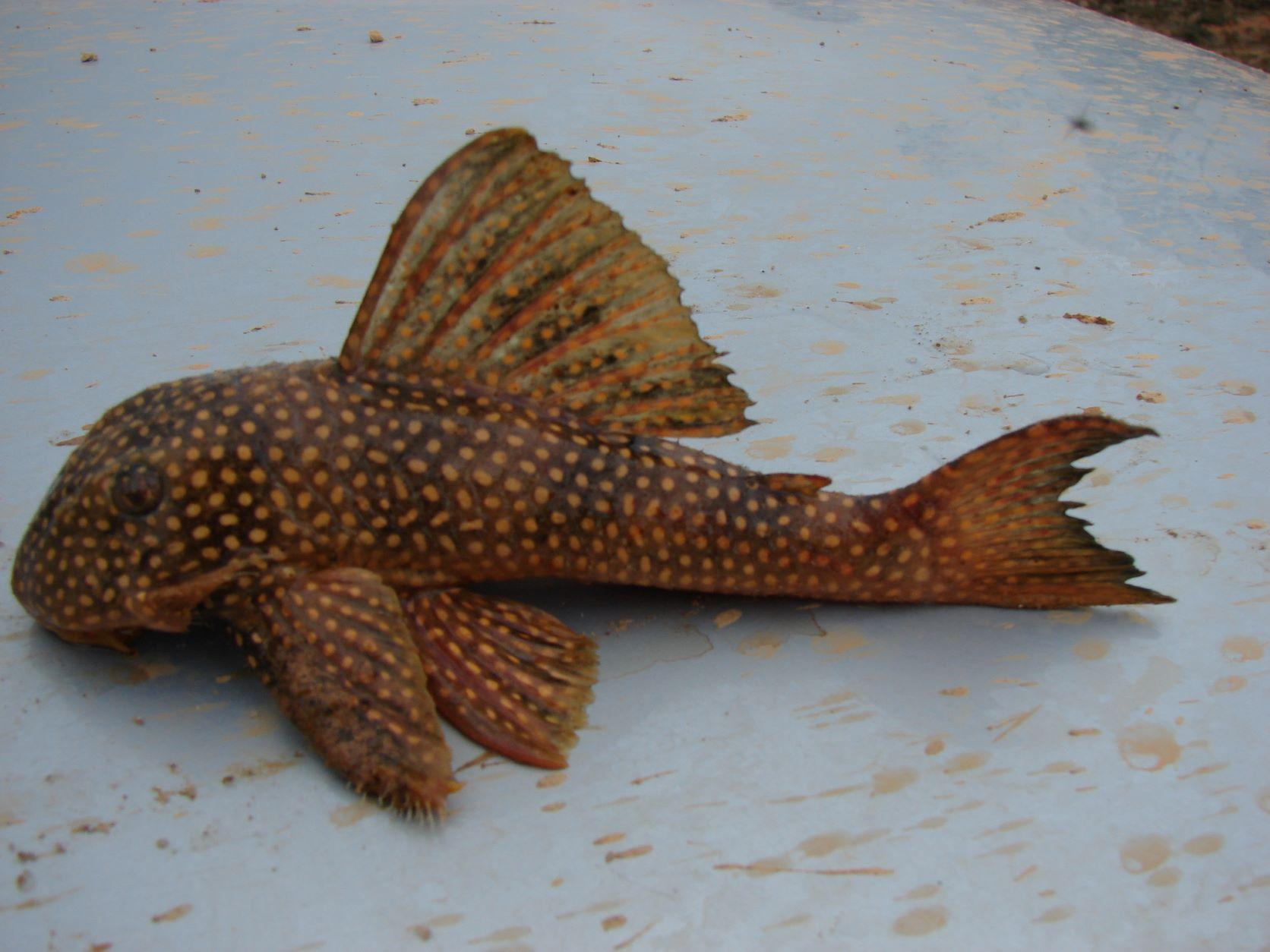

Conservation status
- Vulnerable (IUCN 3.1)

Scientific classification
- Kingdom: Animalia
- Phylum: Chordata
- Class: Actinopterygii
- Division: Teleostei
- Order: Siluriformes
- Family: Loricariidae
- Genus: Scobinancistrus
- Species: S. pariolispos

Binomial name
- Scobinancistrus pariolispos Isbrücker & Nijssen, 1989

= Scobinancistrus pariolispos =

Species of catfish

Scobinancistrus pariolispos is a species of freshwater ray-finned fish belonging to the family Loricariidae, the suckermouth armoured catfishes, and the subfamily Hypostominae, the suckermouth catfishes. This catfish is endemic to Brazil, where it occurs in the Xingu, Tapajós and Tocantins River basins in the states of Pará and Tocantins. The species reaches a total length of 27 cm (11 in). It is the type species of the genus Scobinancistrus.

S. pariolispos appears in the aquarium trade, where it is typically referred to either as the golden cloud pleco or by its associated L-number, which is L-133 or L-048.
