= Spectracanthicus tocantinensis =

Scientific classification
- Kingdom: Animalia
- Phylum: Chordata
- Class: Actinopterygii
- Division: Teleostei
- Order: Siluriformes
- Family: Loricariidae
- Genus: Spectracanthicus
- Species: S. tocantinensis

Binomial name
- Spectracanthicus tocantinensis Chamon & Rapp Py-Daniel, 2014

Species of catfish

Spectracanthicus tocantinensis is a species of freshwater ray-finned fish belonging to the family Loricariidae, the suckermouth armoured catfishes, and the subfamily Hypostominae, the suckermouth catfishes. This catfish is endemic to Brazil, where it occurs in the lower Tocantins River in the state of Pará in Brazil. The species reaches a standard length of 9.3 cm (3.7 in). Its specific epithet, tocantinensis, refers to its type locality, the Tocantins.

S. tocantinensis occasionally appears in the aquarium trade, where it is typically referred to either as the spotted Maraba pleco (presumably referencing the Brazilian municipality of Marabá, located near the confluence of the Tocantins and the Itacaiúnas River) or by one of two associated L-numbers, which are L-086 and LDA-014.
