= Spectracanthicus murinus =

Conservation status
- Least Concern (IUCN 3.1)

Scientific classification
- Kingdom: Animalia
- Phylum: Chordata
- Class: Actinopterygii
- Division: Teleostei
- Order: Siluriformes
- Family: Loricariidae
- Subfamily: Hypostominae
- Genus: Spectracanthicus
- Species: S. murinus

Binomial name
- Spectracanthicus murinus Nijssen & Isbrücker, 1987

Species of fish

Spectracanthicus murinus is a species of freshwater ray-finned fish belonging to the family Loricariidae, the suckermouth armoured catfishes, and the subfamily Hypostominae, the suckermouth catfishes. This catfish is endemic to the Brazilian state of Pará where it is found in the Tapajós River basin, and may be found in the lower Xingu River basin. This species grows to a standard length of 9.7 cm (3.8 in).

S. murinus appears to be unique among related species, sometimes referred to as the subfamily Ancistrinae, in that it has lost many of the traits that describe this group, such as evertible cheek plates and modified opercle.
