= Hypostomus macushi =

Scientific classification
- Kingdom: Animalia
- Phylum: Chordata
- Class: Actinopterygii
- Division: Teleostei
- Order: Siluriformes
- Family: Loricariidae
- Genus: Hypostomus
- Species: H. macushi

Binomial name
- Hypostomus macushi Armbruster & Lesley S. de Souza, 2005

Species of fish

Hypostomus macushi is a species of catfish in the family Loricariidae. It is native to South America, where it occurs in the Essequibo River, the Ireng River, the Rupununi, and the Takutu River along the border of Brazil and Guyana. The species is typically seen near dead, submerged wood in areas with moderate to fast-flowing water. The species reaches 17 cm (6.7 inches) SL and is believed to be a facultative air-breather.

== Etymology ==
Its specific epithet, macushi, refers to the Macushi people of the Rupununi region who collected specimens of the species and are stated to have provided the authors of its description, Jonathan W. Armbruster and Lesley S. de Souza, with hospitality while in Guyana.

== Aquarium ==
H. macushi occasionally appears in the aquarium trade, where it is referred to either as the red pepper pleco or by its associated L-number, which is L-303.
