= Leporacanthicus galaxias =

Conservation status
- Least Concern (IUCN 3.1)

Scientific classification
- Kingdom: Animalia
- Phylum: Chordata
- Class: Actinopterygii
- Order: Siluriformes
- Family: Loricariidae
- Subfamily: Hypostominae
- Genus: Leporacanthicus
- Species: L. galaxias

Binomial name
- Leporacanthicus galaxias Isbrücker & Nijssen, 1989

Species of fish

Leporacanthicus galaxias is a species of freshwater ray-finned fish belonging to the family Loricariidae, the suckermouth armoured catfishes, and the subfamily Hypostominae, the suckermouth catfishes. This catfish is found in the middle and lower Amazon River, Araguaia, Tocantins, Guamá and Orinoco basins, in Brazil, Colombia and Venezuela. This species reaches a standard length of 21.1 cm (8.3 in).
