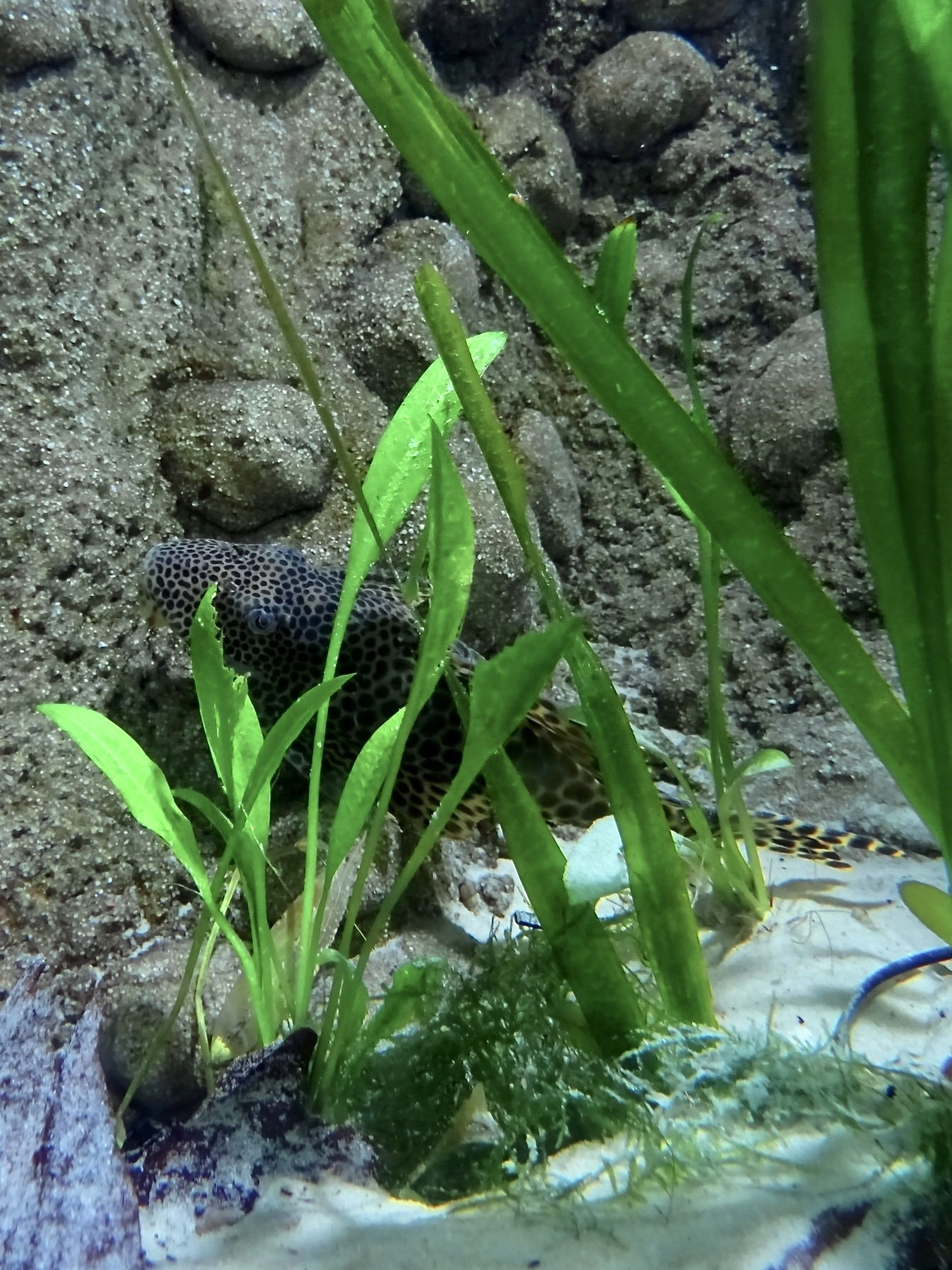

Conservation status
- Least Concern (IUCN 3.1)

Scientific classification
- Kingdom: Animalia
- Phylum: Chordata
- Class: Actinopterygii
- Division: Teleostei
- Order: Siluriformes
- Family: Loricariidae
- Subfamily: Hypostominae
- Genus: Peckoltia
- Species: P. sabaji

Binomial name
- Peckoltia sabaji Armbruster, 2003

= Peckoltia sabaji =

Species of fish

Peckoltia sabaji is a species of freshwater ray-finned fish belonging to the family Loricariidae, the suckermouth armoured catfishes, and the subfamily Hypostominae, the suckermouth catfishes. This catfish is found in South America, where it is distributed in the Amazon, Orinoco and Essequibo river basins, occurring in Brazil, Colombia, Venezuela and Guyana. It is usually found among boulders in medium to large rivers. The species reaches a standrd length of 19.8 cm (7.8 in).

P. sabaji was originally placed in the genus Peckoltia by Jonathan W. Armbruster of Auburn University in 2003, although Armbruster transferred the species to the genus Hemiancistrus in 2008 following a review of Peckoltia, and Hemiancistrus sabaji is still accepted by sources such as FishBase. In 2015, Armbruster, alongside Nathan K. Lujan, Nathan R. Lovejoy, and Hernán López-Fernández, determined that P. sabaji should be moved out of Hemiancistrus and returned to Peckoltia, and a subsequent taxonomic review conducted later in 2015 by Armbruster, David C. Werneke, and Milton Tan affirms this reclassification.
