= Ancistomus feldbergae =

Scientific classification
- Kingdom: Animalia
- Phylum: Chordata
- Class: Actinopterygii
- Order: Siluriformes
- Family: Loricariidae
- Genus: Ancistomus
- Species: A. feldbergae

Binomial name
- Ancistomus feldbergae (de Oliveira, Rapp Py-Daniel, Zuanon & Rocha, 2012)

Synonyms
- Peckoltia feldbergae

Species of catfish

Ancistomus feldbergae is a species of catfish in the family Loricariidae. It is native to South America, where it occurs in the Xingu River basin in Brazil.

It is usually found in shallow rapids with a substrate composed of small-to-medium flat rocks up to 50 cm (20 in) in diameter above coarse sand and pebbles. Individuals are frequently seen hiding under these flat rocks during the day and foraging on algae growing on the upper surface of the rocks at night. The species is primarily herbivorous, feeding mainly on diatoms, although sponge fragments and sand grains have also been found in the stomach contents of specimens. The species reaches 17.1 cm (6.7 in) in standard length and has an intestine that can reach nearly 11 times that length.

Although originally described as a species of Peckoltia in 2012, a 2015 review conducted by Jonathan W. Armbruster (of Auburn University), David C. Werneke, and Milton Tan listed the species as valid within Ancistomus.

Ancistomus feldbergae appears in the aquarium trade, where it is often referred to either as the orange-fin Xingu pleco, the Gainsboro pleco, or by one of two associated L-numbers, which are L-012 and L-013. A very similar species, but found in the Rio do Pará, is designated L-163.
