= Lasiancistrus tentaculatus =

Conservation status
- Least Concern (IUCN 3.1)

Scientific classification
- Kingdom: Animalia
- Phylum: Chordata
- Class: Actinopterygii
- Division: Teleostei
- Order: Siluriformes
- Family: Loricariidae
- Subfamily: Hypostominae
- Genus: Lasiancistrus
- Species: L. tentaculatus

Binomial name
- Lasiancistrus tentaculatus Armbruster, 2005

Species of fish

Lasiancistrus tentaculatus is a species of freshwater ray-finned fish belonging to the family Loricariidae, the suckermouth armoured catfishes, and the subfamily Hypostominae, the suckermouth catfishes. This catfish has a wide distribution in the drainage system of the Orinoco in Colombia and Venezuela, it is also found in the drainage basin of the Valencia Lake in Venezuela. This species reaches a standard length of 14.8 cm (5.8 in).
