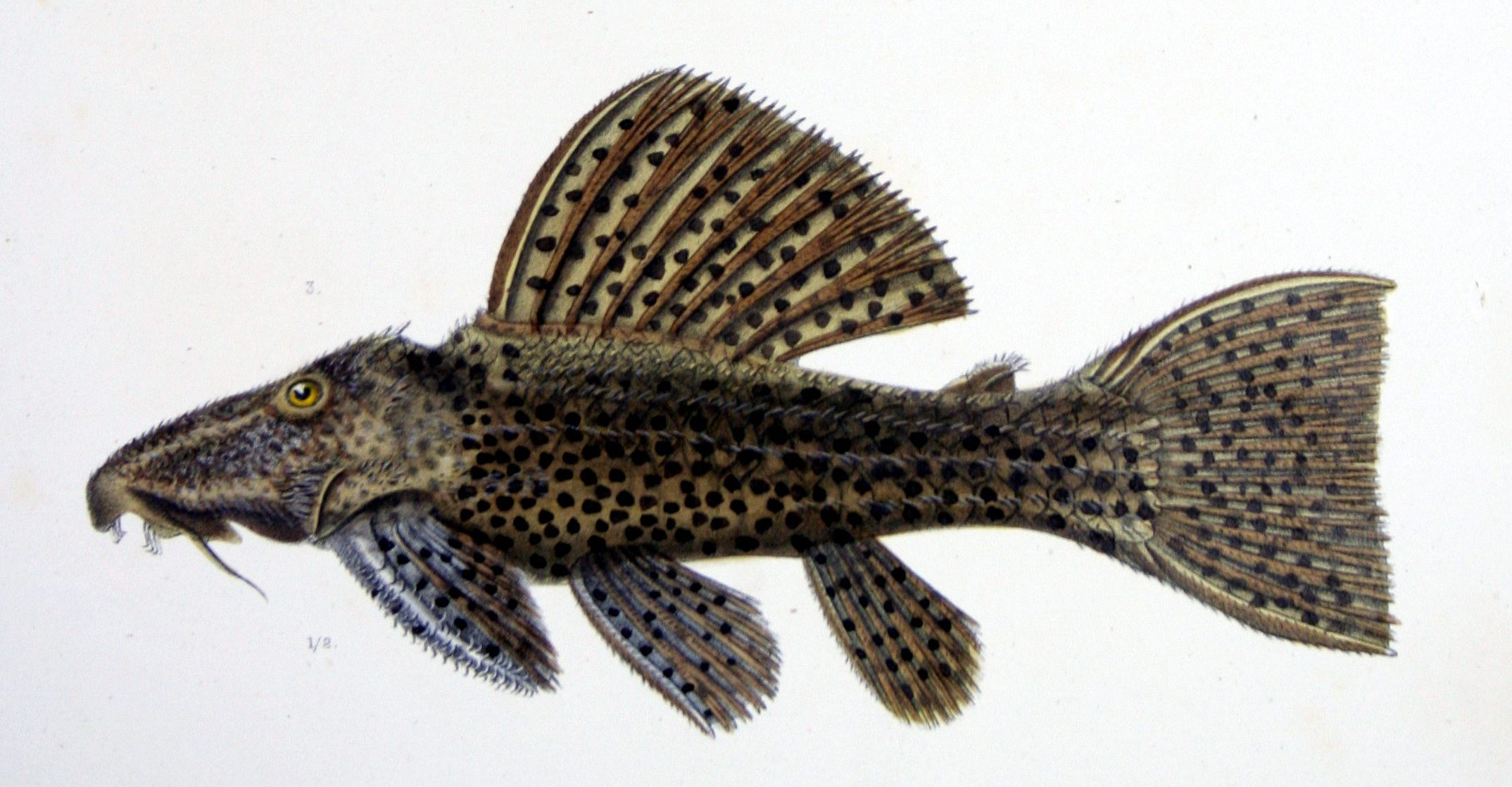

Conservation status
- Least Concern (IUCN 3.1)

Scientific classification
- Kingdom: Animalia
- Phylum: Chordata
- Class: Actinopterygii
- Order: Siluriformes
- Family: Loricariidae
- Genus: Pseudacanthicus
- Species: P. spinosus

Binomial name
- Pseudacanthicus spinosus (Castelnau, 1855)

Synonyms
- Hypostomus spinosus Castelnau, 1855

= Pseudacanthicus spinosus =

Species of fish

Pseudacanthicus spinosus, the leopard pleco or spinybody pleco, is a species of freshwater ray-finned fish belonging to the family Loricariidae, the suckermouth armoured catfishes, and the subfamily Hypostominae, the suckermouth catfishes. This catfish is found in South America where it occurs in the Amazon Basin of Brazil and Ecuador. This species grows to a standard length of 26 cm (10 in).
