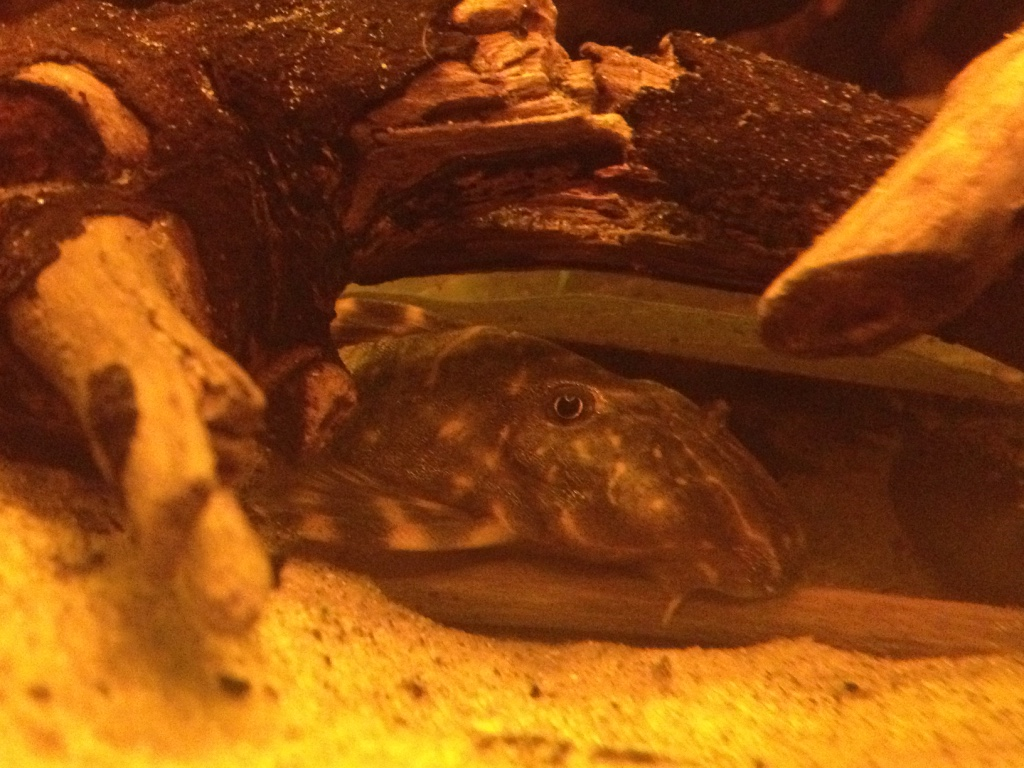

Conservation status
- Least Concern (IUCN 3.1)

Scientific classification
- Kingdom: Animalia
- Phylum: Chordata
- Class: Actinopterygii
- Order: Siluriformes
- Family: Loricariidae
- Genus: Panaqolus
- Species: P. maccus

Binomial name
- Panaqolus maccus (Schaefer & D. J. Stewart, 1993)

Synonyms
- Panaque maccus Schaefer & Stewart, 1993

= Panaqolus maccus =

Species of dwarf loricariid

Panaqolus maccus, commonly called the clown panaque, clown plecostomus, clown pleco, or ringlet pleco, is a species of freshwater ray-finned fish belonging to the family Loricariidae, the suckermouth armored catfishes, and the subfamily Hypostominae, the suckermouth catfishes. By numbering systems such as the L-number system, this fish may also be known as L104, L162, or LDA22.

== Distribution and habitat ==
This fish is native to Venezuela and Colombia where it is found in the tannic Apuré and Caroní River basins. Their natural environment is driftwood tangles near riverbanks.

== Description ==
This species is a small loricariid. It reaches a length of 8.8 centimetres (3.5 in) SL.

This species has a striped pattern. However, this colouration may change with age. There are specimens with straight bars, but there are also specimens with a broken or wavy pattern. The wavy pattern form is found in the actual Orinoco and its tributaries in Bolivar State, Venezuela, while the "normal" patterned P. maccus comes from further north and west (Cojedes, Portuguesa, Guarico, and Apure States) in the Llanos where the drainages run into the Apure River.

== In the aquarium ==
Panaqolus maccus is one of the most common species of small, striped loricariids available in the fishkeeping hobby. This species adapts well to aquarium life. They are not too difficult to spawn.

It should always be provided with enough driftwood in the tank, as it is a wood-eating fish. However fresh vegetables, spirulina and frozen foods such as bloodworms are recommended to be given as well from time to time. They are very peaceful fish suited for the average community tank. They are a hardy species of catfish and can tolerate various water parameters but prefer softer, more acidic water. Good filtration is needed because of the large amounts of waste they produce, caused by their wood-based diet. It is suited for tanks starting from 15 gallons.

=== Breeding ===
It is difficult to successfully breed these fish in captivity. The tank setting and water parameters must be as near to their native habitat as possible. Seasonal changes can be simulated by adjusting the pH and temperature of the water. Soft driftwoods and cave formations give ample hiding places for the females to feel comfortable, and they may deposit eggs at some point.
