= Hypostomus nematopterus =

Scientific classification
- Kingdom: Animalia
- Phylum: Chordata
- Class: Actinopterygii
- Order: Siluriformes
- Family: Loricariidae
- Genus: Hypostomus
- Species: H. nematopterus

Binomial name
- Hypostomus nematopterus Isbrücker & Nijssen, 1984

Species of catfish

Hypostomus nematopterus is a species of catfish in the family Loricariidae. It is native to South America, where it occurs in the Oyapock basin in French Guiana. The species reaches 10.7 cm (4.2 in) in standard length and is believed to be a facultative air-breather.

Hypostomus nematopterus appears in the aquarium trade, where it is typically referred to either as the thread-finned pleco or by its associated L-number, which is L-060.
