= Ancistomus snethlageae =

Conservation status
- Endangered (IUCN 3.1)

Scientific classification
- Kingdom: Animalia
- Phylum: Chordata
- Class: Actinopterygii
- Order: Siluriformes
- Family: Loricariidae
- Genus: Ancistomus
- Species: A. snethlageae

Binomial name
- Ancistomus snethlageae (Steindachner, 1911)

Synonyms
- Ancistrus snethlageae; Hemiancistrus snethlageae; Lasiancistrus snethlageae; Peckoltia snethlageae

Species of catfish

Ancistomus snethlageae is a species of catfish in the family Loricariidae. It is native to South America, where it occurs in the Tapajós basin in Brazil. The species reaches 22 cm (8.7 in) in total length. Although originally described as a species of Ancistrus in 1911 by Franz Steindachner and subsequently reclassified in the genera Hemiancistrus, Lasiancistrus, and Peckoltia, a 2015 review conducted by Jonathan W. Armbruster (of Auburn University), David C. Werneke, and Milton Tan listed the species as valid within Ancistomus.

Ancistomus snethlageae appears in the aquarium trade, where it is often referred to either as the ghost pleco or by one of two associated L-numbers, which are L-141 and L-215.
