= Peckoltia vermiculata =

Conservation status
- Data Deficient (IUCN 3.1)

Scientific classification
- Kingdom: Animalia
- Phylum: Chordata
- Class: Actinopterygii
- Division: Teleostei
- Order: Siluriformes
- Family: Loricariidae
- Genus: Peckoltia
- Species: P. vermiculata

Binomial name
- Peckoltia vermiculata (Steindachner, 1908)

Synonyms
- Ancistrus vittatus var. vermiculata Steindachner, 1908

Species of catfish

Peckoltia vermiculatais a species of freshwater ray-finned fish belonging to the family Loricariidae, the suckermouth armoured catfishes, and the subfamily Hypostominae, the suckermouth catfishes. This fish is found in South America, where it is known only from its type series, collected from an uncertain locality, in the middle Amazon River in the Brazilian state of Pará. A record has been claimed for Guajará Bay but that needs confirmation. This species reaches a standard length of 13 cm (5.1 in).
