= Avalithoxus =

Conservation status
- Data Deficient (IUCN 3.1)

Scientific classification
- Kingdom: Animalia
- Phylum: Chordata
- Class: Actinopterygii
- Division: Teleostei
- Order: Siluriformes
- Family: Loricariidae
- Subfamily: Hypostominae
- Genus: Avalithoxus; Lujan, Armbruster & Lovejoy, 2018
- Species: A. jantjae

Binomial name
- Avalithoxus jantjae (Lujan, 2008)

Synonyms
- Lithoxus jantjae Lujan, 2008

Species of fish

Avalithoxus is a monospecific genus of freshwater ray-finned fish belonging to the family Loricariidae, the suckermouth armoured catfishes, and the subfamily Hypostominae, the suckermouth catfishes. The only species in this genus is Avalithoxus jantjae which is endemic to Venezuela where it occurs in the Ventuari River above the Tencua Falls. This species grows to a length of 3.8 centimetres (1.5 in) SL.

== Etymology ==
The generic name derives from ava meaning "grandmother" and Lithoxus, the genus where it was formerly placed, as an allusion to its basal position, and to the author's mother's nickname in the specific name, as she is grandmother to his children. The specific name honours Lujan's mother Jeanne, known as Jantje before she emigrated from the Netherlands.
