= Pseudolithoxus kinja =

Scientific classification
- Kingdom: Animalia
- Phylum: Chordata
- Class: Actinopterygii
- Division: Teleostei
- Order: Siluriformes
- Family: Loricariidae
- Genus: Pseudolithoxus
- Species: P. kinja

Binomial name
- Pseudolithoxus kinja Bifi, de Oliveira, Rapp Py-Daniel & Collins, 2018

Species of catfish

Pseudolithoxus kinja is a species of freshwater ray-finned fish belonging to the family Loricariidae, the suckermouth armoured catfishes, and the subfamily Hypostominae, the suckermouth catfishes. This catfish is endemic to Brazil where it occurs in the clearwater rivers flowing from the Brazilian and Guiana shields in Amazonas. This species reaches a standard length of 15.3 cm (6.0 in). The specific name, kinja, is the endonym of the Waimiri-Atroari indigenous people who the authors describe as “brave people who survived three attempts of genocide in the last century, and survive and thrive today in their protected area”, who live around the Uatumã River where this fish is found.
