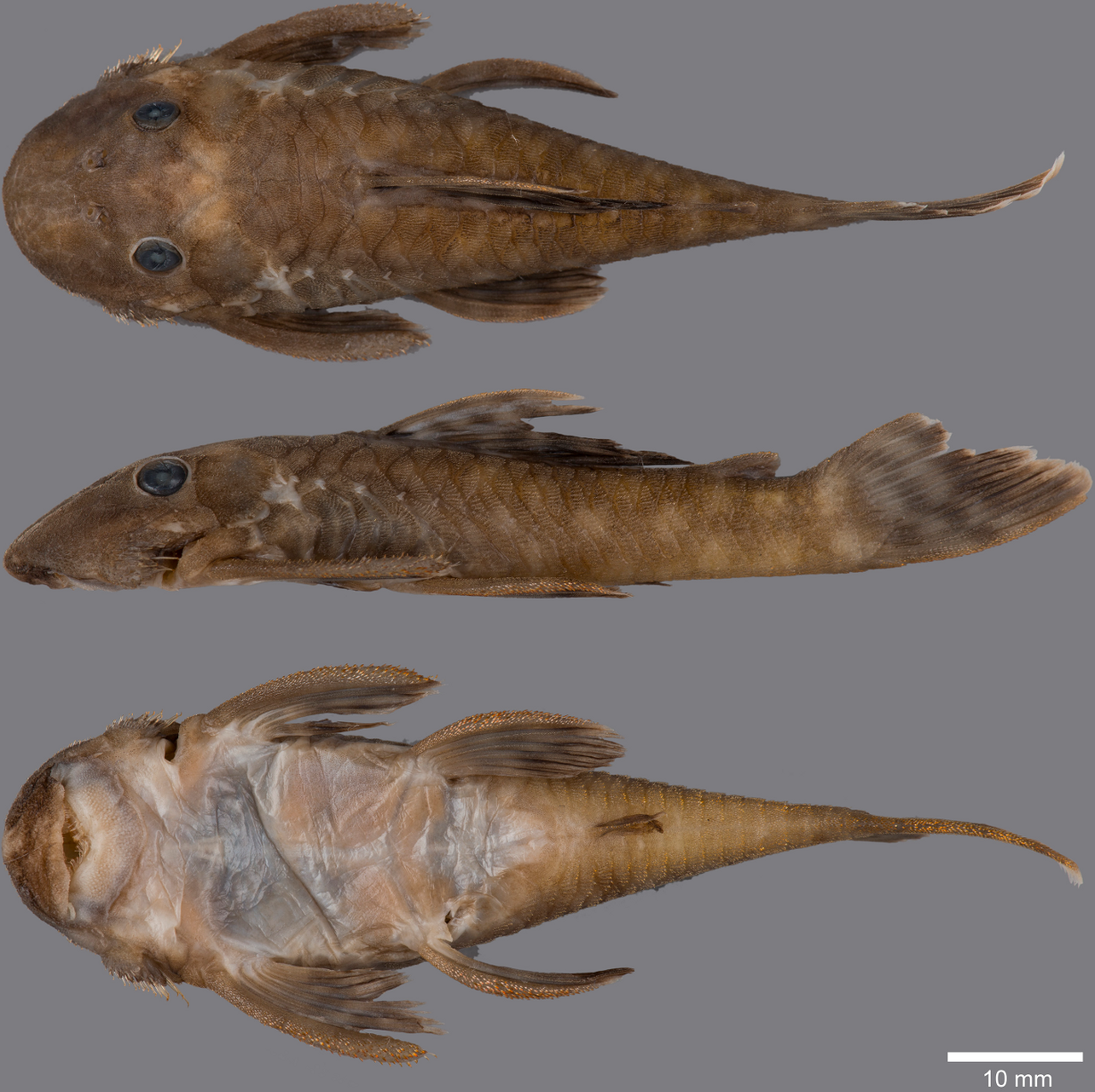

Scientific classification
- Kingdom: Animalia
- Phylum: Chordata
- Class: Actinopterygii
- Order: Siluriformes
- Family: Loricariidae
- Subfamily: Hypostominae
- Genus: Cryptancistrus; Fisch-Muller, Mol & Covain, 2018
- Species: C. similis

Binomial name
- Cryptancistrus similis Fisch-Muller, Mol & Covain, 2018

= Cryptancistrus =

Species of catfish

Cryptancistrus similis is a species of catfish in the family Loricariidae and the only member of the monotypic genus Cryptancistrus. It is a freshwater fish native to South America, where it occurs in the upper Paru de Oeste River in Brazil. The species reaches 6.2 cm (2.4 inches) in standard length. It was described in 2018 by Sonia Fisch-Muller, Jan Mol (of Anton de Kom University of Suriname), and Raphael Covain (of the University of Geneva) as part of a taxonomic review of the genus Guyanancistrus, which Cryptancistrus was found to be distinct from but closely related to. Its specific epithet, similis, is derived from Latin and references the species' similarity to the species of Guyanancistrus, specifically Guyanancistrus brevispinis.
