= Spectracanthicus =

Scientific classification
- Kingdom: Animalia
- Phylum: Chordata
- Class: Actinopterygii
- Division: Teleostei
- Order: Siluriformes
- Family: Loricariidae
- Subfamily: Hypostominae
- Genus: Spectracanthicus; Nijssen & Isbrücker, 1987

Type species
- Spectracanthicus murinus Nijssen & Isbrücker, 1987

Synonyms
- Oligancistrus Rapp Py-Daniel, 1989

Genus of fishes

Spectracanthicus is a genus of is a genus of freshwater ray-finned fishes belonging to the family Loricariidae, the suckermouth armored catfishes, and the subfamily Hypostominae, the suckermouth catfishes. The catfishes in this genus are endemic to Brazil where they are found in the Tapajós, Xingu and Tocantins river basins. They live in fast-flowing waters. The largest species in the genus reaches up to 13 cm (5.1 in) in standard length. They feed on algae and small invertebrates.

== Species ==
There are currently six recognized species in this genus:

- Spectracanthicus immaculatus Chamon & Rapp Py-Daniel, 2014
- Spectracanthicus javae Chamon, Pereira, Mendonça & Akama, 2018
- Spectracanthicus murinus Nijssen & Isbrücker, 1987
- Spectracanthicus punctatissimus Steindachner, 1881
- Spectracanthicus tocantinensis Chamon & Rapp Py-Daniel, 2014
- Spectracanthicus zuanoni Chamon & Rapp Py-Daniel, 2014
