= Ancistrus ranunculus =

Conservation status
- Near Threatened (IUCN 3.1)

Scientific classification
- Kingdom: Animalia
- Phylum: Chordata
- Class: Actinopterygii
- Order: Siluriformes
- Family: Loricariidae
- Genus: Ancistrus
- Species: A. ranunculus

Binomial name
- Ancistrus ranunculus Fisch-Muller, A. R. Cardoso, J. F. P. da Silva & Bertaco, 2005

Species of catfish

Ancistrus ranunculus is a species of freshwater ray-finned fish belonging to the family Loricariidae, the suckermouth armoured catfishes, and the subfamily Hypostominae, the suckermouth catfishes. This catfish is found in Colombia and Venezuela.

== Taxonomy ==
Ancistrus ranunculus was first formally described in 2016 by the ichthyologists Sonia Fisch-Muller, who is Swiss, Alexandre Rodrigues Cardoso, José Francisco Pezzi da Silva and Vinicius de Araújo Bertaco, who are Brazilian, with its type locality given as the Xingu River at furo do Tucum Seco, near Arroz Cru, in the Brazilian state of Pará. Eschmeyer's Catalog of Fishes classifies the genus Ancistrus in the subfamily Hypostominae, the suckermouth catfishes, within the suckermouth armored catfish family Loricariidae. It has also been classified in the tribe Ancistrini by some authorities.

== Etymology ==
Ancistrus ranunculus is classified in the genus Ancistrus, a name coined by Rudolf Kner, but when he proposed the genus he did not explain the etymology of the name. It is thought to be from the Greek ágkistron, meaning a "fish hook" or the "hook of a spindle", a reference to the hooked odontodes on the interopercular bone. The specific name, ranunculus, is a diminutive of rana, meaning "frog", an allusion to the name "tadpole ancistrus" used in the aquarium trade, referring to the tadpole like appearrance of this catfish.

== Description ==
Ancistrus ranunculus reaches a standard length of 19.5 cm (7.7 in) and a weight of 153.7 g (5.42 oz). Ancistrus species develop soft, bushy tentacles on the snout when sexually mature, these are better developed in the males than they are in females.

== Distribution and habitat ==
Ancistrus ranunculus is endemic to Brazil in the state of Pará, where it has a wide distribution, occurring in the basins of the Xingu, Tocantins and Araguaia Rivers. This catfish is only found in rocky rapids. Groups of these fishes occupy narrow cracks in the rocks, staying in these crevices for amlmost all of the time. They feed on detritivores and grazers on tiny algae, including cyanobacteria.

== Conservation status ==
Ancistrus ranunculus is classified ar Near Threatened by the IUCN. The main threat to this species are a number of proposed hydroelectric dams that affect most of the river ssytems this species occurs in..
