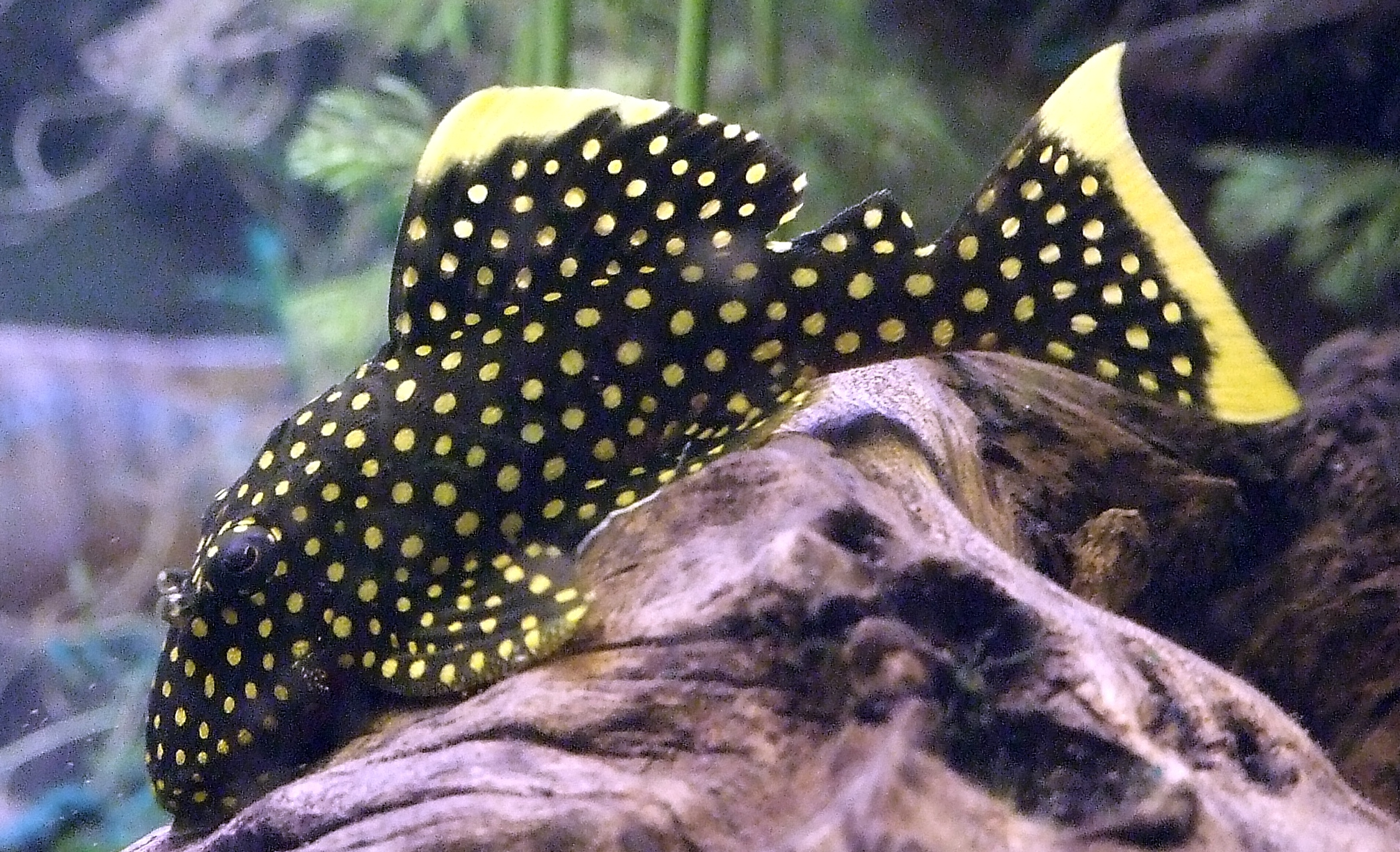

Conservation status
- Near Threatened (IUCN 3.1)

Scientific classification
- Kingdom: Animalia
- Phylum: Chordata
- Class: Actinopterygii
- Order: Siluriformes
- Family: Loricariidae
- Genus: Baryancistrus
- Species: B. xanthellus

Binomial name
- Baryancistrus xanthellus Rapp Py-Daniel, Zuanon & R. R. de Oliveira, 2011

= Baryancistrus xanthellus =

Species of fish

Baryancistrus xanthellus is a species of freshwater ray-finned fish belonging to the family Loricariidae, the suckermouth armoured catfishes, and the subfamily Hypostominae, the suckermouth catfishes. This benthic catfish is endemic to Brazil where it is found in the Volta Grande and Xingu River, as well as the area immediately above Belo Monte falls and the Iriri River. It reaches a standard length of 22.4 cm (8.8 in). It appears in the aquarium trade, where it is typically referred to either by its associated L-numbers, which are L018, L081, L085, L177, LDA60, LDA116 or LDA117; or as the gold nugget pleco.
