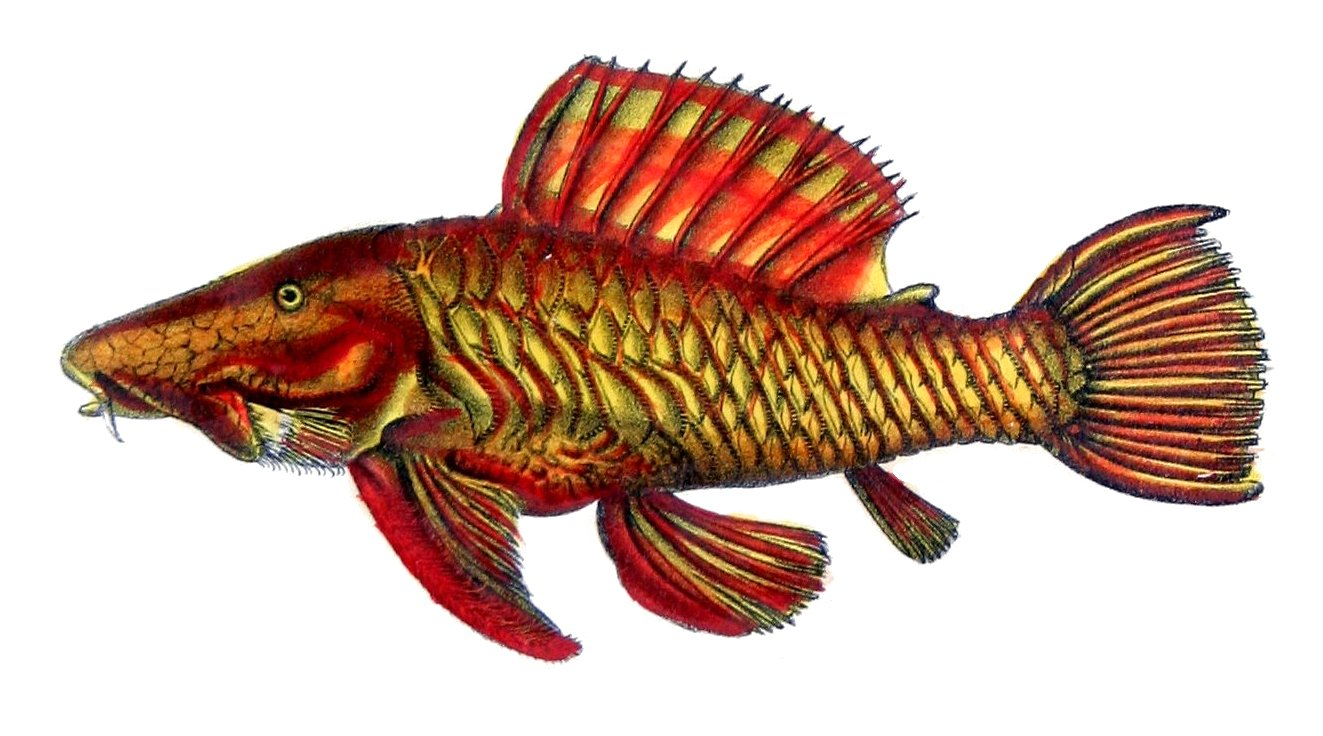
- Parancistrus aurantiacus

Scientific classification
- Kingdom: Animalia
- Phylum: Chordata
- Class: Actinopterygii
- Order: Siluriformes
- Family: Loricariidae
- Tribe: Ancistrini
- Genus: Parancistrus; Bleeker, 1862

Type species
- Hypostomus aurantiacus Castelnau, 1855

Synonyms
- Acanthodemus Marschall, 1873

= Parancistrus =

Genus of fishes

Parancistrus is a genus of freshwater ray-finned fishes belonging to the family Loricariidae, the suckermouth armoured catfishes, and the subfamily Hypostominae, the suckermouth catfishes. These catfish are found in South America.

== Taxonomy ==
Parancistrus was first proposed as a monospecific genus in 1862 by the Dutch physician, herpetologist and ichthyologist Pieter Bleeker with Hypostomus aurantiacus designated as its type species, as well as being its only species. H. aurantiacus was formally described in 1855 by François-Louis Laporte, comte de Castelnau with its type locality given as the Ucayali River in Peru. Some authorities regard this genus as being within the tribe Ancistrini of the subfamily Hypostominae, but Eschmeyer's Catalog of Fishes does not recognise tribes within the subfamily Hypostominae.

== Species ==
Parancistrus contains the following valid species:

- Parancistrus aurantiacus (Castelnau, 1855)
- Parancistrus nudiventris Rapp Py-Daniel & Zuanon, 2005

== Appearance and anatomy ==
Parancistrus is unique among loricariids due to the presence of fleshy folds on the naked area around the dorsal fin and at the pectoral fin points insertion in the breeding males. Breeding males also have elongated odontodes on their bodies and pectoral fin spines.

Parancistrus have stout bodies that are completely plated in adults. The dorsal fin membrane connects to the adipose fin spine. Their color is typically slate gray to black, occasionally with white streaks. They have large gill openings, which makes the genus different from all other loricariids except some Pogonopoma and Rhinelepis.
