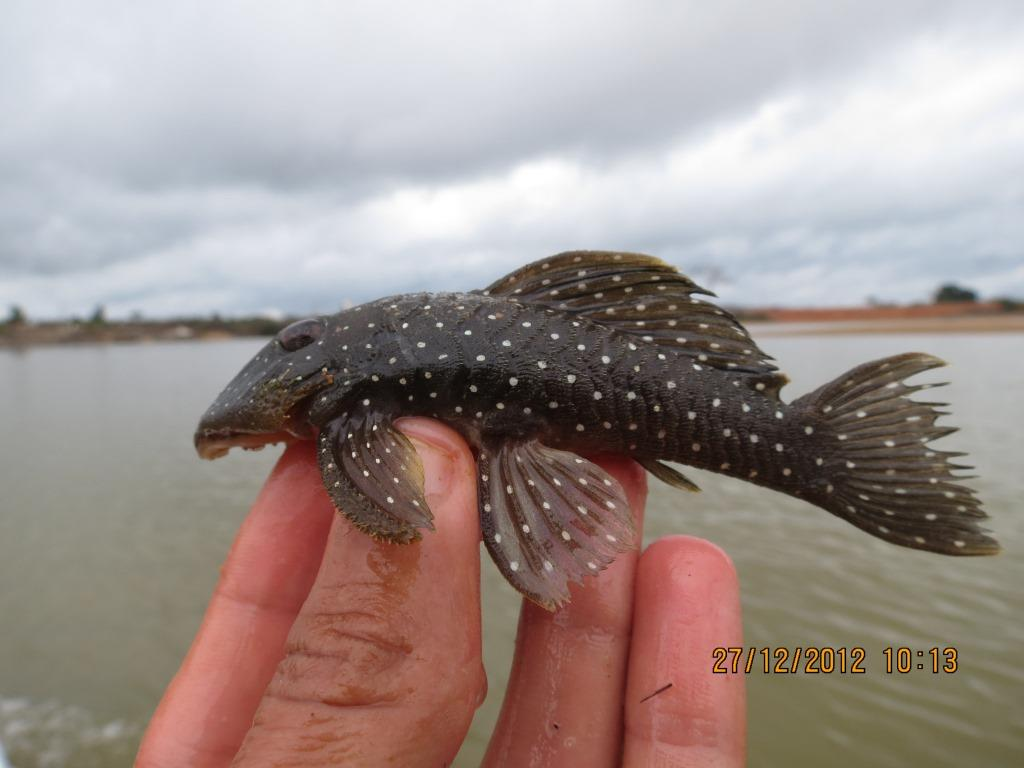

Conservation status
- Vulnerable (IUCN 3.1)

Scientific classification
- Kingdom: Animalia
- Phylum: Chordata
- Class: Actinopterygii
- Order: Siluriformes
- Family: Loricariidae
- Subfamily: Hypostominae
- Tribe: Ancistrini
- Genus: Parancistrus
- Species: P. nudiventris

Binomial name
- Parancistrus nudiventris Rapp Py-Daniel & Zuanon, 2005

= Parancistrus nudiventris =

Species of fish

Parancistrus nudiventris is a species of freshwater ray-finned fish belonging to the family Loricariidae, the suckermouth armoured catfishes, and the subfamily Hypostominae, the suckermouth catfishes. This catfish is endemic to Brazil where it occurs in the Xingu River in the state of Pará. This species grows to a standard length of 17.5 cm (6.9 in).
