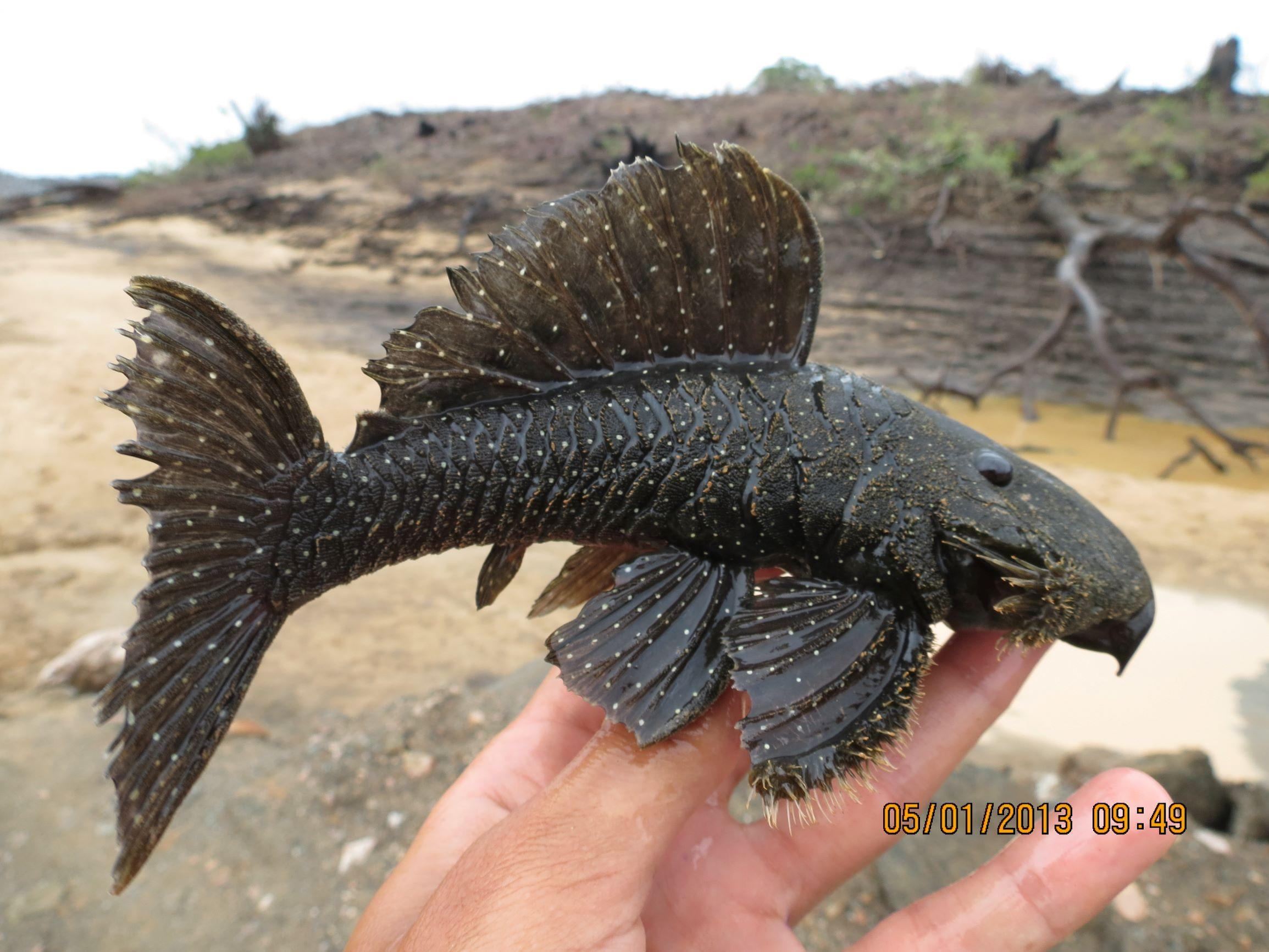

Conservation status
- Least Concern (IUCN 3.1)

Scientific classification
- Kingdom: Animalia
- Phylum: Chordata
- Class: Actinopterygii
- Division: Teleostei
- Order: Siluriformes
- Family: Loricariidae
- Subfamily: Hypostominae
- Genus: Spectracanthicus
- Species: S. punctatissimus

Binomial name
- Spectracanthicus punctatissimus (Steindachner, 1881)

Synonyms
- Chaetostomus punctatissimus Steindachner, 1881; Oligancistrus punctatissimus (Steindachner, 1881); Parancistrus punctatissimus (Steindachner, 1881)

= Spectracanthicus punctatissimus =

Species of fish

Spectracanthicus punctatissimus is a species of freshwater ray-finned fish belonging to the family Loricariidae, the suckermouth armoured catfishes, and the subfamily Hypostominae, the suckermouth catfishes. This catfish is endemic to Brazil where it occurs in the state of Pará in the basin of the Tapajos River. This species reaches a standard length of 10.6 cm (4.2 in).
