= Isorineloricaria villarsi =

Scientific classification
- Kingdom: Animalia
- Phylum: Chordata
- Class: Actinopterygii
- Order: Siluriformes
- Family: Loricariidae
- Genus: Isorineloricaria
- Species: I. villarsi

Binomial name
- Isorineloricaria villarsi (Lütken, 1874)

Synonyms
- Plecostomus villarsi Lütken, 1874; Hypostomus villarsi (Lütken, 1874); Squaliforma villarsi (Lütken, 1874)

Species of catfish

Isorineloricaria villarsi is a species of catfish in the family Loricariidae. Some sources, notably FishBase, recognize this species as Squaliforma villarsi. It is native to South America, where it is known only from the Maracaibo basin in northwestern Venezuela and extreme eastern Colombia.

== Taxonomy ==
Isorineloricaria villarsi was originally described as a member of Plecostomus by Christian Frederik Lütken in 1874, although it was subsequently transferred to Hypostomus after Plecostomus was found to be an invalid genus. It was later classified within the now-invalid genus Squaliforma, until a 2016 taxonomic review of the genera Aphanotorulus and Isorineloricaria conducted by Jonathan W. Armbruster and C. Keith Ray found it to be a member of Isorineloricaria.

== Description ==
The species reaches 32 cm (12.6 inches) in standard length and, as its congeners, is believed to be a facultative air-breather.
