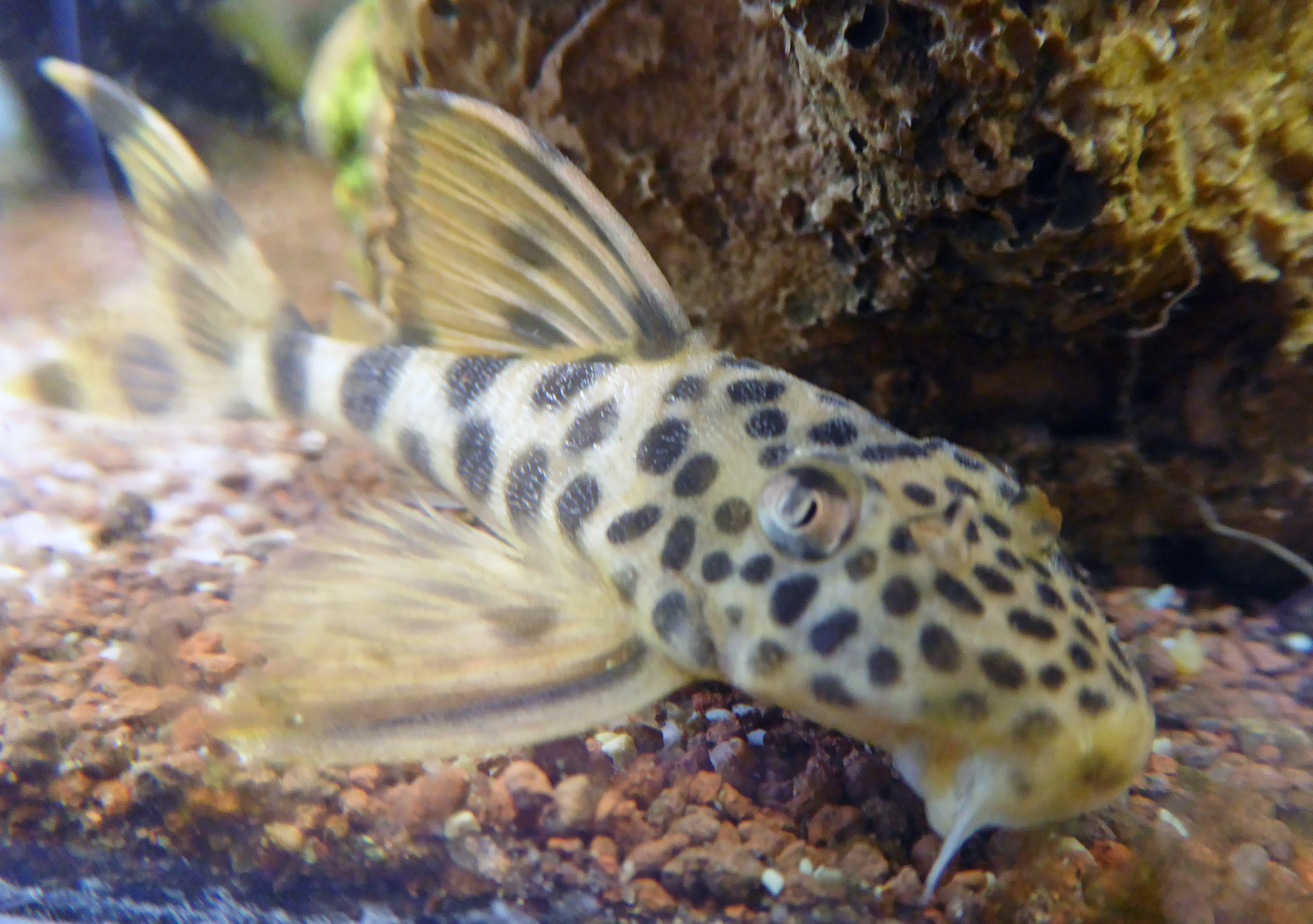
- Ancistomus sp.

Scientific classification
- Kingdom: Animalia
- Phylum: Chordata
- Class: Actinopterygii
- Order: Siluriformes
- Family: Loricariidae
- Subfamily: Hypostominae
- Genus: Ancistomus; Isbrücker & Seidel, 2001

= Ancistomus =

Genus of fishes

Ancistomus is a genus of suckermouth armored catfishes found in shallow waters in rapidly flowing rivers in the southeastern Amazon basin in Brazil.

== Species ==
There are currently 5 recognized species in this genus:

- Ancistomus feldbergae Renildo Ribeiro de Oliveira, Lúcia Helena Rapp Py-Daniel, Jansen Alfredo, Sampaio Zuanon & Marcelo Salles Rocha, 2012
- Ancistomus micrommatos Alexandre Rodrigues Cardoso & Paulo Henrique Franco Lucinda, 2003
- Ancistomus snethlageae Franz Steindachner, 1911
- Ancistomus spilomma Alexandre Rodrigues Cardoso & Paulo Henrique Franco Lucinda, 2003
- Ancistomus spinosissimus Alexandre Rodrigues Cardoso & Paulo Henrique Franco Lucinda, 2003
