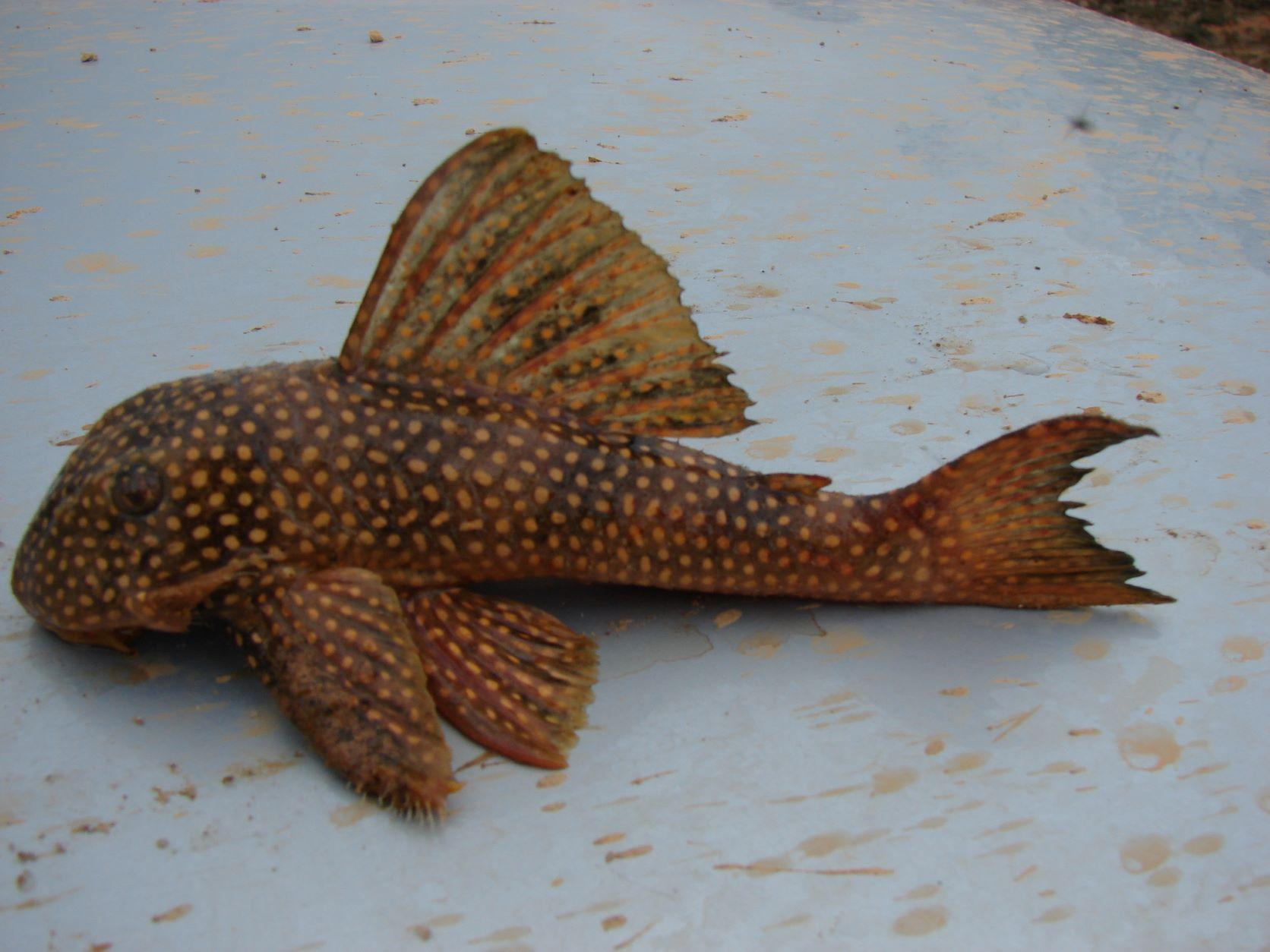
- Scobinancistrus pariolispos

Scientific classification
- Kingdom: Animalia
- Phylum: Chordata
- Class: Actinopterygii
- Division: Teleostei
- Order: Siluriformes
- Family: Loricariidae
- Subfamily: Hypostominae
- Genus: Scobinancistrus; Isbrücker & Nijssen, 1989

Type species
- Scobinancistrus pariolispos Isbrücker & Nijssen, 1989

= Scobinancistrus =

Genus of fishes

Scobinancistrus is a genus of freshwater ray-finned fishes belonging to the family Loricariidae, the suckermouth armored catfishes, and the subfamily Hypostominae, the suckermouth catfishes. These catfishes are founf in the southeastern Amazon, occurring in the Tocantins, Xingu, Trombetas, Tapajós basins in Brazil. They are black with numerous white to orange spots, and the fins can have broad reddish-orange edging. They reach a total length of up to 27–29 cm (11–11 in).

== Taxonomy ==
Scobinancistrus was first proposed as a monospecific genus in 1989 by the Dutch ichthyologists Isaäc J. H. Isbrücker and Han Nijssen when they described Scobinancistrus pariolispos, which they also designated as the type species of this genus. The type locality of S. pariolispos was given as the Tocantins River at Jatobal in the Brazilian state of Pará. Some authorities regard this genus as being within the tribe Ancistrini of the subfamily Hypostominae, but Eschmeyer's Catalog of Fishes does not recognise tribes within the subfamily Hypostominae.

== Species ==
Scobinancistrus contains the following valid species:

- Scobinancistrus aureatus W. E. Burgess, 1994
- Scobinancistrus pariolispos Isbrücker & Nijssen, 1989
- Scobinancistrus raonii Chaves, Oliveira, Gonçalves, Sousa & Rapp Py-Daniel, 2023

== Etymology ==
Scobinancistrus combines the Latin scobina, which meas "rasp", with the genus name Ancistrus, the type genus of the tribe Ancistrini. The fsrt part of the name refers to the long, thin, spoon shaped teeth of these catfishes, many related taxa feed on wood but these fishes are carnivores.
