= Ancistomus spinosissimus =

Scientific classification
- Kingdom: Animalia
- Phylum: Chordata
- Class: Actinopterygii
- Order: Siluriformes
- Family: Loricariidae
- Genus: Ancistomus
- Species: A. spinosissimus

Binomial name
- Ancistomus spinosissimus (Cardoso & Lucinda, 2003)

Synonyms
- Hemiancistrus spinosissimus

Species of catfish

Ancistomus spinosissimus is a species of catfish in the family Loricariidae. It is a freshwater fish native to South America, where it is known only from the upper and middle Tocantins River basin in Brazil. The species reaches 12.7 cm (5 inches) in standard length. Although originally described as a species of Hemiancistrus in 2003, a 2015 review conducted by Jonathan W. Armbruster (of Auburn University), David C. Werneke, and Milton Tan listed the species as valid within Ancistomus. The same review also reported that no characteristics were found to separate A. spinosissimus from its congeners A. micrommatos and A. spilomma, indicating that the three may actually all be the same species.
