= Hypostomus boulengeri =

- juvenile

Conservation status
- Least Concern (IUCN 3.1)

Scientific classification
- Kingdom: Animalia
- Phylum: Chordata
- Class: Actinopterygii
- Division: Teleostei
- Order: Siluriformes
- Family: Loricariidae
- Genus: Hypostomus
- Species: H. boulengeri

Binomial name
- Hypostomus boulengeri (C. H. Eigenmann & C. H. Kennedy, 1903)

Synonyms
- Plecostomus boulengeri C. H. Eigenmann & C. H. Kennedy, 1903

Species of catfish

Hypostomus boulengeri is a species of freshwater ray-finned fish belonging to the family Loricariidae, the suckermouth armored catfishes, and the subfamily Hypostominae, the suckermouth catfishes. This species reaches a standard length of 24.5 cm (9.6 in) and is believed to be a facultative air-breather.

H. boulengeri was originally described in 1903 from the Paraguay River basin in Paraguay and Brazil. In 2005, its presence in the Paraná River basin in Argentina was confirmed. In 2016, it was found to occur in the Bermejo River basin as well.

== Etymology ==
The fish is named in honor of Belgian-born British ichthyologist and herpetologist George A. Boulenger of the British Museum (Natural History).
