= Ancistomus spilomma =

Scientific classification
- Kingdom: Animalia
- Phylum: Chordata
- Class: Actinopterygii
- Order: Siluriformes
- Family: Loricariidae
- Genus: Ancistomus
- Species: A. spilomma

Binomial name
- Ancistomus spilomma (Cardoso & Lucinda, 2003)

Synonyms
- Hemiancistrus spilomma

Species of catfish

Ancistomus spilomma is a species of catfish in the family Loricariidae. It is native to South America, where it is known only from the Tocantins River basin in Brazil. The species reaches 14.2 cm (5.6 inches) in standard length. Although originally described as a species of Hemiancistrus in 2003, a 2015 review conducted by Jonathan W. Armbruster (of Auburn University), David C. Werneke, and Milton Tan listed the species as valid within Ancistomus. The same review also reported that no characteristics were found to separate A. spilomma from its congeners A. micrommatos and A. spinosissimus, indicating that the three may actually all be the same species.
