= Hypostomus latifrons =

Scientific classification
- Domain: Eukaryota
- Kingdom: Animalia
- Phylum: Chordata
- Class: Actinopterygii
- Order: Siluriformes
- Family: Loricariidae
- Genus: Hypostomus
- Species: H. latifrons

Binomial name
- Hypostomus latifrons Weber, 1986

Species of fish

Hypostomus latifrons is a species of catfish in the family Loricariidae. It is native to South America, where it occurs in the Paraguay River basin. The species reaches 28.7 cm (11.3 inches) SL and is believed to be a facultative air-breather.

H. latifrons appears in the aquarium trade, where it is typically referred to either as the Paraguay pleco or by one of two associated L-numbers, which are L-051 and L-281.
