= Hypostomus cochliodon =

Conservation status
- Least Concern (IUCN 3.1)

Scientific classification
- Kingdom: Animalia
- Phylum: Chordata
- Class: Actinopterygii
- Division: Teleostei
- Order: Siluriformes
- Family: Loricariidae
- Genus: Hypostomus
- Species: H. cochliodon

Binomial name
- Hypostomus cochliodon (Kner, 1854)

Synonyms
- Cochliodon cochliodon (Kner, 1854)

Species of fish

Hypostomus cochliodon is a species of freshwater ray-finned fish belonging to the family Loricariidae, the suckermouth armored catfishes, and the subfamily Hypostominae, the suckermouth catfishes. This catfish occurs in the Paraguay and middle Paraná River basins in northern Argentina, Bolivia, southern Brazil and Paraguay. Initially it did not occur in the upper Paraná basin above the Guaíra Falls, but these disappeared after the construction of the Itaipu Dam, allowing this species (and several others) to spread. It grows to a standard length of 23 cm (9.1 in).

The species is sometimes kept in aquaria.

Unlike most other Loricariidae, it has been speculated that this fish is a wood-eating specialist alongside the usual plant material and algae (see also xylophagy in Panaque).
