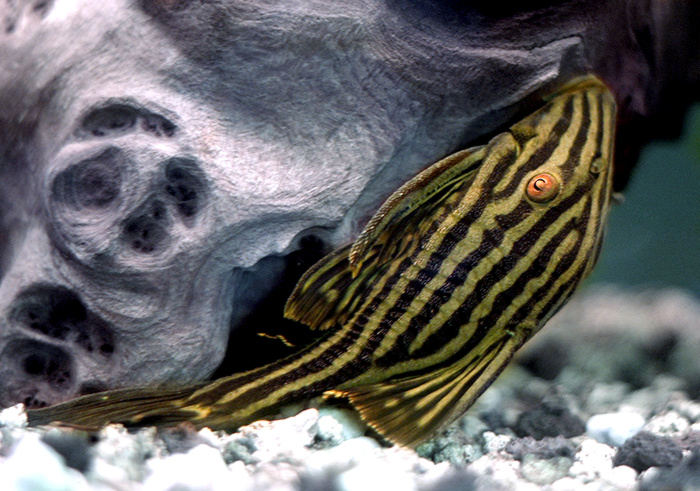
- Panaque sp. cf. nigrolineatus in an aquarium

Conservation status
- Least Concern (IUCN 3.1)

Scientific classification
- Kingdom: Animalia
- Phylum: Chordata
- Class: Actinopterygii
- Order: Siluriformes
- Family: Loricariidae
- Subfamily: Hypostominae
- Genus: Panaque
- Species: P. nigrolineatus

Binomial name
- Panaque nigrolineatus (Peters, 1877)

Synonyms
- Chaetostomus nigrolineatus Peters, 1877

= Panaque nigrolineatus =

Species of fish

Panaque nigrolineatus, the royal panaque, royal plec, or royal pleco, is an herbivorous freshwater armored catfish native to Brazil, Colombia and Venezuela, where it occurs in the Orinoco and Amazon basins. It is known for being one of the few xylophagous fish, and is able to survive for a long period of time on a wood-only diet. It is also a popular aquarium fish.

== Taxonomy ==
The royal panaque was first described as Chaetostomus nigrolineatus by the German naturalist W. C. H. Peters in 1877; Chaetostomus was a misspelling of Chaetostoma. It was moved to the newly erected genus Panaque in 1889 and designated as its type species.

Some authorities recognize two subspecies within this species: P. n. nigrolineatus Peters, 1877 (the nominate subspecies) and P. n. laurafabiane Ortega-Lara & Lujan, 2020 (watermelon pleco). There are also several undescribed varieties of Panaque very similar to the royal panaque in appearance and that are commonly traded as aquarium fish. All share the same basic coloration, but vary in the shape and distribution of the stripes and the amount of cream or gold on the fins. These may be regional variations, subspecies, or closely related species. These varieties are tentatively and informally named as follows (with the exception of the 'olive pleco' variety, all are named after the river from which it is collected):

- Panaque sp. cf. nigrolineatus 'Tapajos'
- Panaque sp. cf. nigrolineatus 'olive pleco'
- Panaque sp. cf. nigrolineatus 'Tocantins'
- Panaque sp. cf. nigrolineatus 'Xingu'

== Description ==
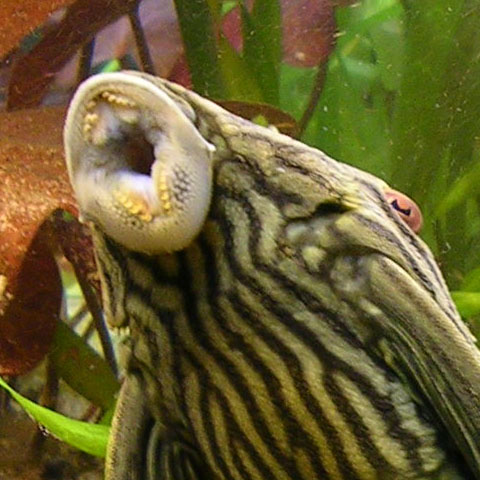
Mouth and teeth of the royal panaque

The royal panaque is light grey in color, patterned with dark grey longitudinal stripes. Eyes are red and the dorsal fin is edged with cream or gold. Like most other species in the family, the body is encased in heavy armor, which is made of strong plates of skin, not scales; the belly is an exception, and is soft. It can grow to 43 cm (17 in) in standard length.

== Distribution and habitat ==
The royal panaque can be found in the Orinoco River and a number of tributaries of the Amazon River. The subspecies P. n. laurafabiane is, in particular, found in the Guaviare river in the southwest Orinoco basin.

== Biology ==
The royal panaque feeds on plants (including algae) and roots, and is among the very few fish capable of eating and digesting wood. It does so with the help of symbiotic gut bacteria.

== Human interactions ==
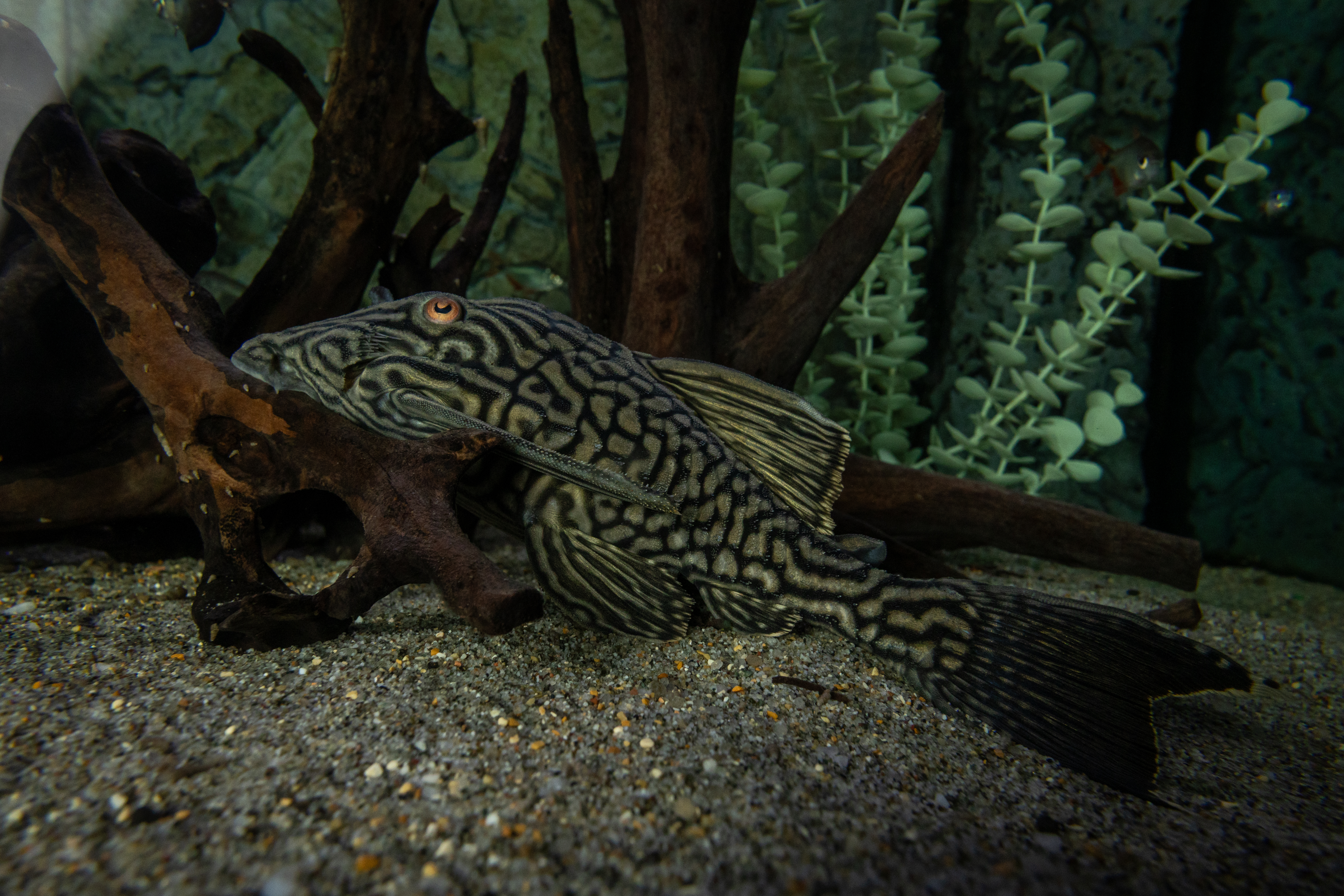
A royal panaque in the Natural History Museum of the University of Pisa

The royal panaque is valuable as an aquarium fish. Maintenance is as for other Panaque species, with the fish needing plenty of space, well oxygenated water, and a regular supply of vegetables and wood on which to feed. Young are often imported in an undernourished state and require dedicated attention to recover. Primarily nocturnal, the royal panaque is generally shy under the light and will keep in hiding during the day. It is territorial, so a suitable resting area for this fish is necessary.

== Conservation status ==
The royal panaque has mostly recently been accessed by the IUCN in 2020. It was determined to be a Least Concern species, despite the recognition that it is heavily harvested in Colombia by the aquarium trade.
