= Hypostomus faveolus =

Scientific classification
- Kingdom: Animalia
- Phylum: Chordata
- Class: Actinopterygii
- Order: Siluriformes
- Family: Loricariidae
- Genus: Hypostomus
- Species: H. faveolus

Binomial name
- Hypostomus faveolus Zawadzki, Birindelli & Lima, 2008

Species of fish

Hypostomus faveolus is a species of catfish in the family Loricariidae. It is native to South America, where it occurs in the basins of the Tocantins River and the Xingu River in central Brazil. Adults of the species are typically found in both rapids and slow-flowing sections of medium to large rivers with varying substrates, although juveniles have been found in oxbow lakes and smaller streams. The species reaches 20.6 cm (8.1 inches) in standard length and is believed to be a facultative air-breather. Its specific epithet, faveolus, is derived from a Latin word meaning "honeycomb", referencing the honeycomb-like patterning exhibited by the species.

Hypostomus faveolus appears in the aquarium trade, where it is often referred to either as the honeycomb pleco or by its associated L-number, which is L-037.
