= Peckoltichthys bachi =

Conservation status
- Least Concern (IUCN 3.1)

Scientific classification
- Kingdom: Animalia
- Phylum: Chordata
- Class: Actinopterygii
- Order: Siluriformes
- Family: Loricariidae
- Genus: Peckoltichthys; A. Miranda-Ribeiro, 1917
- Species: P. bachi

Binomial name
- Peckoltichthys bachi (Boulenger 1898)

Synonyms
- Hemiancistrus arenarius Eigenmann & Allen 1942; Chaetostomus bachi Boulenger 1898; Peckoltia bachi Boulenger 1898; Peckoltichthys filicaudatus Miranda Ribeiro 1917; Hemiancistrus ucayalensis Fowler, 1940

Species of fish

Peckoltichthys bachi is a species of armored catfish and the only member of its genus. This species is found throughout the upper Amazon River and its tributaries in Brazil, Colombia, Ecuador, and Peru. The species reaches 14 cm (5.5 in) SL. FishBase lists this species as a member of Peckoltia.
