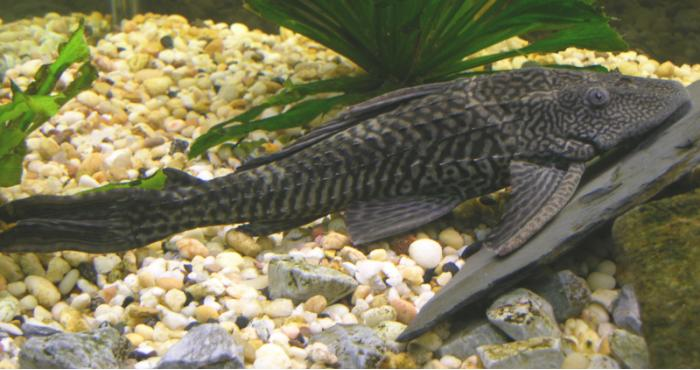
- Pterygoplichthys sp.

Scientific classification
- Kingdom: Animalia
- Phylum: Chordata
- Class: Actinopterygii
- Order: Siluriformes
- Family: Loricariidae
- Subfamily: Hypostominae; Kner, 1853

Tribes
- Ancistrini; Corymbophanini; Hypostomini; Pterygoplichthyini; Rhinelepini

= Hypostominae =

Subfamily of fishes

The Hypostominae are a subfamily of catfishes of the family Loricariidae. Most members are restricted to tropical and subtropical South America, but there are also several species (in genera Ancistrus, Chaetostoma, Lasiancistrus, Leptoancistrus and Hemiancistrus) in southern Central America. Hypostomus plecostomus, which is popular in the aquarium trade, has been introduced to several regions far from its native range.

Studies conducted with representatives of some genera of Hypostominae showed, within this group, the diploid number ranges from 2n = 52 to 2n = 80. However, the supposed wide karyotypic diversity the family Loricariidae or the subfamily Hypostominae would present is almost exclusively restricted to the genus Hypostomus, and the species from the other genera had a conserved diploid number.

== Taxonomy ==
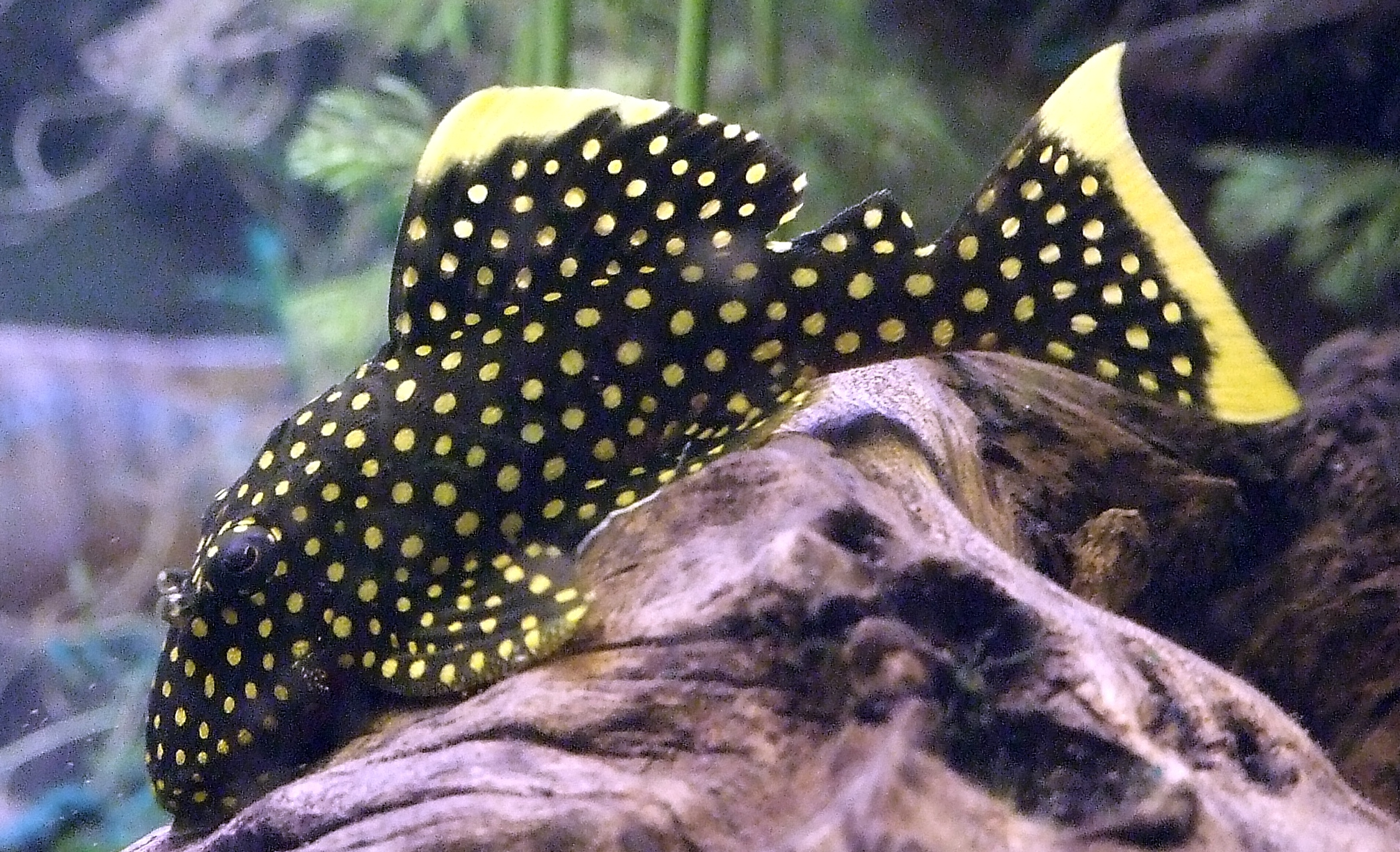
Baryancistrus xanthellus

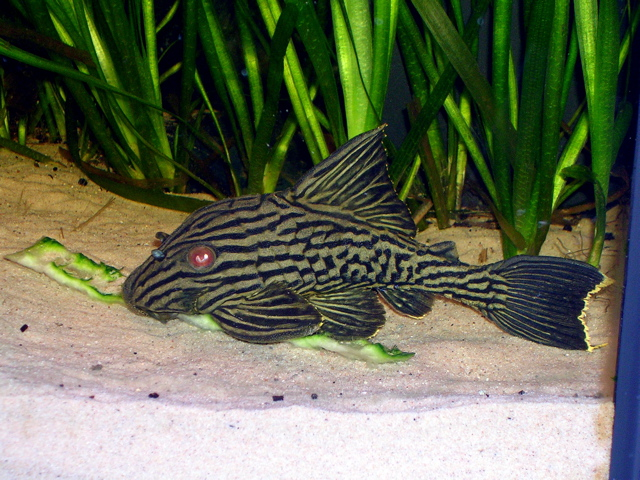
Panaque nigrolineatus

Hypostominae contains the following genera, sometimes organized in tribes as set out below:

- Ancistrini (sometimes considered a separate subfamily as Ancistrinae)
  - Acanthicus Agassiz, 1829
  - Ancistrus Kner, 1854
  - Andeancistrus Lujan, Meza-Vargas & Barriga-S., 2015
  - Araichthys Zawadzki, Bifi & Mariotto, 2016
  - Avalithoxus Lujan, Armbruster & Lovejoy, 2018
  - Baryancistrus Rapp Py-Daniel, 1989
  - Chaetostoma Tschudi, 1846
  - Cordylancistrus Isbrücker, 1980
  - Dekeyseria Rapp Py-Daniel, 1985
  - Dolichancistrus Isbrücker, 1980
  - Exastilithoxus Isbrücker & Nijssen, 1979
  - Hemiancistrus Bleeker, 1862
  - Hopliancistrus Isbrücker & Nijssen, 1989
  - Hypancistrus Isbrücker & Nijssen, 1991
  - Lasiancistrus Regan, 1904
  - Leporacanthicus Isbrücker & Nijssen, 1989
  - Lithoxus C. H. Eigenmann, 1910
  - Lithoxancistrus Isbrücker, Nijssen & Cala, 1988
  - Megalancistrus Isbrücker, 1980
  - Neblinichthys Ferraris, Isbrücker & Nijssen, 1986
  - Panaqolus Isbrücker & Schraml, 2001
  - Panaque C. H. Eigenmann & R. S. Eigenmann, 1889
  - Paralithoxus Boeseman, 1982
  - Parancistrus Bleeker, 1862
  - Paulasquama Armbruster & Taphorn, 2011
  - Pseudacanthicus Bleeker, 1862
  - Pseudancistrus Bleeker, 1862
  - Pseudolithoxus Isbrücker & Werner, 1989
  - Pseudoqolus Lujan, Cramer, Covain, Fisch-Muller & López-Fernández, 2017
  - Scobinancistrus Isbrücker & Nijssen, 1989
  - Spectracanthicus Isbrücker & Nijssen, 1987
  - Transancistrus Lujan, Meza-Vargas & Barriga Salazar, 2015
  - Yaluwak Lujan & Ambruster, 2019
- Corymbophanini
  - Corymbophanes C. H. Eigenmann, 1909
- Hypostomini
  - Aphanotorulus Isbrücker & Nijssen, 1983
  - Hypostomus Lacépède, 1803
  - Isorineloricaria Isbrücker, 1980
- Pterygoplichthyini
  - Pterygoplichthys Gill, 1858
- Incertae sedis
  - Ancistomus Isbrücker & Seidel, 2001
  - Colossimystax Armbruster & Lujan, 2025
  - Cryptancistrus Fisch-Muller, Mol & Covain, 2018
  - Guyanancistrus Isbrücker, 2001
  - Leptoancistrus Meek & Hildebrand, 1916 (likely Ancistrini)
  - Peckoltia A. Miranda-Ribeiro, 1912(likely Ancistrini)
  - Peckoltichthys A. Miranda Ribeiro, 1917
  - Stellantia Armbruster & Lujan, 2025

Eschmeyer's Catalog of Fishes does not include any groupings between subfamily and genera.
