= Aphanotorulus phrixosoma =

Conservation status
- Data Deficient (IUCN 3.1)

Scientific classification
- Kingdom: Animalia
- Phylum: Chordata
- Class: Actinopterygii
- Division: Teleostei
- Order: Siluriformes
- Family: Loricariidae
- Genus: Aphanotorulus
- Species: A. phrixosoma

Binomial name
- Aphanotorulus phrixosoma (Fowler, 1940)

Synonyms
- Plecostomus phrixosoma Fowler, 1940; Squaliforma phrixosoma (Fowler, 1940); Hypostomus phrixosoma (Fowler, 1940)

Dubious species of catfish

Aphanotorulus phrixosoma is a dubious species of catfish belonging to the family Loricariidae, the suckermouth armored catfishes, and the subfamily Hypostominae, the suckermouth catfishes. It is native to South America, where it occurs in the upper Amazon River basin. The species reaches 10.1 cm (4 in) SL. It is believed to be a facultative air-breather.

A. phrixosoma was originally described as Plecostomus phrixosoma by Henry Weed Fowler in 1940, although it was transferred to the genus Squaliforma (now considered invalid) after the genus' designation by I. J. H. Isbrücker, I. Seidel, J. Michels, E. Schraml, and A. Werner in 2001. In 2004, Jonathan W. Armbruster classified the species within Hypostomus instead of Squaliforma. In 2016, following a review of Isorineloricaria and Aphanotorulus by C. Keith Ray and Armbruster (both of Auburn University), the species was reclassified as a member of Aphanotorulus.

A. phrixosoma is of questionable validity, as it is currently known to originate only from a single specimen that is believed by Ray and Armbruster to be a hybrid between Aphanotorulus horridus and Aphanotorulus unicolor. This is due to the fact that it was collected in an area where A. horridus and A. unicolor are sympatric, and because extensive sampling efforts near the type locality have yielded no additional specimens.
