= Aphanotorulus gomesi =

Conservation status
- Data Deficient (IUCN 3.1)

Scientific classification
- Kingdom: Animalia
- Phylum: Chordata
- Class: Actinopterygii
- Division: Teleostei
- Order: Siluriformes
- Family: Loricariidae
- Genus: Aphanotorulus
- Species: A. gomesi

Binomial name
- Aphanotorulus gomesi (Fowler, 1942)

Synonyms
- Plecostomus iheringi Fowler, 1941; Plecostomus gomesi Fowler, 1942; Hypostomus gomesi (Fowler, 1942); Squaliforma gomesi (Fowler, 1942)

Species of catfish

Aphanotorulus gomesi is a species of benthopelagic tropical freshwater ray-finned fish belonging to the family Loricariidae, the suckermouth armored catfishes, and the subfamily Hypostominae, the suckermouth catfishes. This catfish is endemic to Brazil.

== Taxonomy ==
Aphanotorulus gomesi was first formally described in 1941 as Plecostomus iheringi by the American zoologist Henry Weed Fowler with its type locality given as Ceará, Brazil. However, Fowler's name was preoccuppied by Plecostomus iheringi Regan, 1908 and in the following year he replaced it with Plecostomus gomesi. This species was transferred to the genus Squaliforma after the genus' designation by I. J. H. Isbrücker, I. Seidel, J. Michels, E. Schraml, and A. Werner in 2001. In 2004, Jonathan W. Armbruster reclassified the species within Hypostomus instead of Squaliforma. In 2016, following a review of Isorineloricaria and Aphanotorulus by C. Keith Ray and Armbruster (both of Auburn University), the species was reclassified as a member of Aphanotorulus. The genus Aphanotorulus is sometimes classfied in the tribe Hypostomini, but Eschmeyer's Catalog of Fishes does not recognise tribes within the subfamily Hypostominae.

== Etymology ==
Aphanotorulus gomesi is classified within the genus Aphanotorulus, a name which combines aphanḗs, Greek for "overlooked", with the Latin word torulus which means "a small expansion", a references to the many small papillae in the mouth of the type species, A. frankei. The specific name honours the Brazilian biologist Alcides Lourenço Gomes who told Fowler that his original binomial was preoccuppied.

== Description ==
Aphanotorulus gomesi reaches a standard length of 14.3 cm (5.6 in).

== Distribution and habitat ==
Aphanotorulus gomesi is endemic to Brazil but it is only known from its holotype for which the vague type locality of Ceará was given.

== Conservation status ==
Aphanotorulus gomesi is categorised as Data Deficient by the iucn because it has so little data about its taxonomy, biology, ecology and population.
