= Hypostomus yaku =

Conservation status
- Critically Endangered (IUCN 3.1)

Scientific classification
- Kingdom: Animalia
- Phylum: Chordata
- Class: Actinopterygii
- Division: Teleostei
- Order: Siluriformes
- Family: Loricariidae
- Genus: Hypostomus
- Species: H. yaku

Binomial name
- Hypostomus yaku Martins, Langeani & Zawadzki, 2014

Species of fish

Hypostomus yaku is a species of South American armoured catfish from the family Loricariidae. It is only known from the Rio Quente, a small thermal stream in the Rio Paranaíba drainage of the upper Paraná basin, Brazil. H. yaku is unusual when compared to other species of Hypostomus in that it tolerates warm water up to 34 °C (93 °F) and only attains a relatively small size, growing to 70.8 mm (2.79 in) SL.

== Taxonomy ==
H. yaku can be distinguished from the other members of Hypostomus, some 180 plus species, by the presence, in mature adults, of hypertrophied odontodes arranged randomly along its flanks and caudal peduncle. This characteristic is also found in species of other Hypostominae genera, Aphanotorulus, Peckoltia and Squaliforma, but can be distinguished by several keys (see Martins et al. 2014). H. yaku is most similar to two other species found in the same region, H. nigromaculatus and H. paulinus, but can differentiated by a lack of dark spots (versus presence in H. nigromaculatus) and by smaller adult size (70.8mm SL versus 135 mm (5.3 in) SL in H. paulinus).
