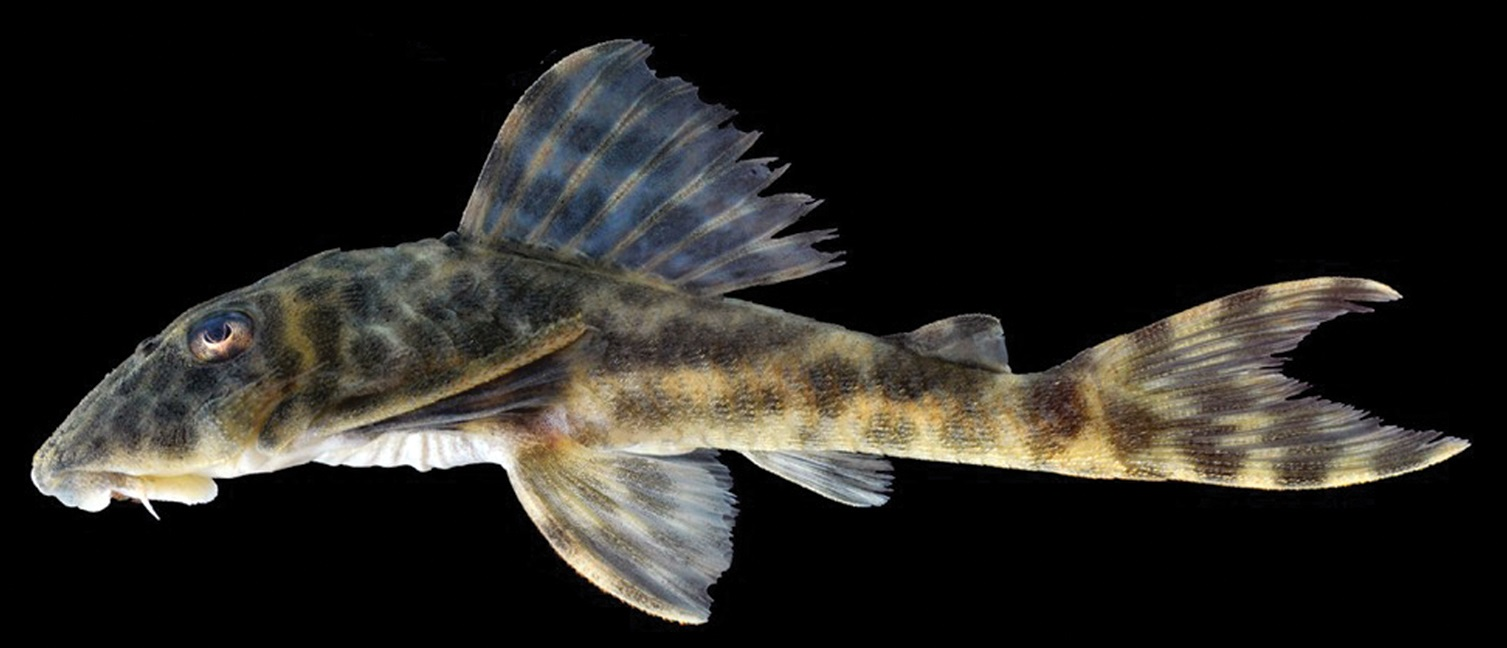

Conservation status
- Least Concern (IUCN 3.1)

Scientific classification
- Kingdom: Animalia
- Phylum: Chordata
- Class: Actinopterygii
- Division: Teleostei
- Order: Siluriformes
- Family: Loricariidae
- Genus: Peckoltia
- Species: P. lujani

Binomial name
- Peckoltia lujani Armbruster, Werneke & Tan, 2015

= Peckoltia lujani =

Species of catfish

Peckoltia lujani is a species of freshwater ray-finned fish belonging to the family Loricariidae, the suckermouth armoured catfishes, and the subfamily Hypostominae, the suckermouth catfishes. This fish is found in South America, where it occurs in the Orinoco and Meta River basins in Venezuela and Colombia. The species reaches a standard length of7.5 cm (3.0 in).

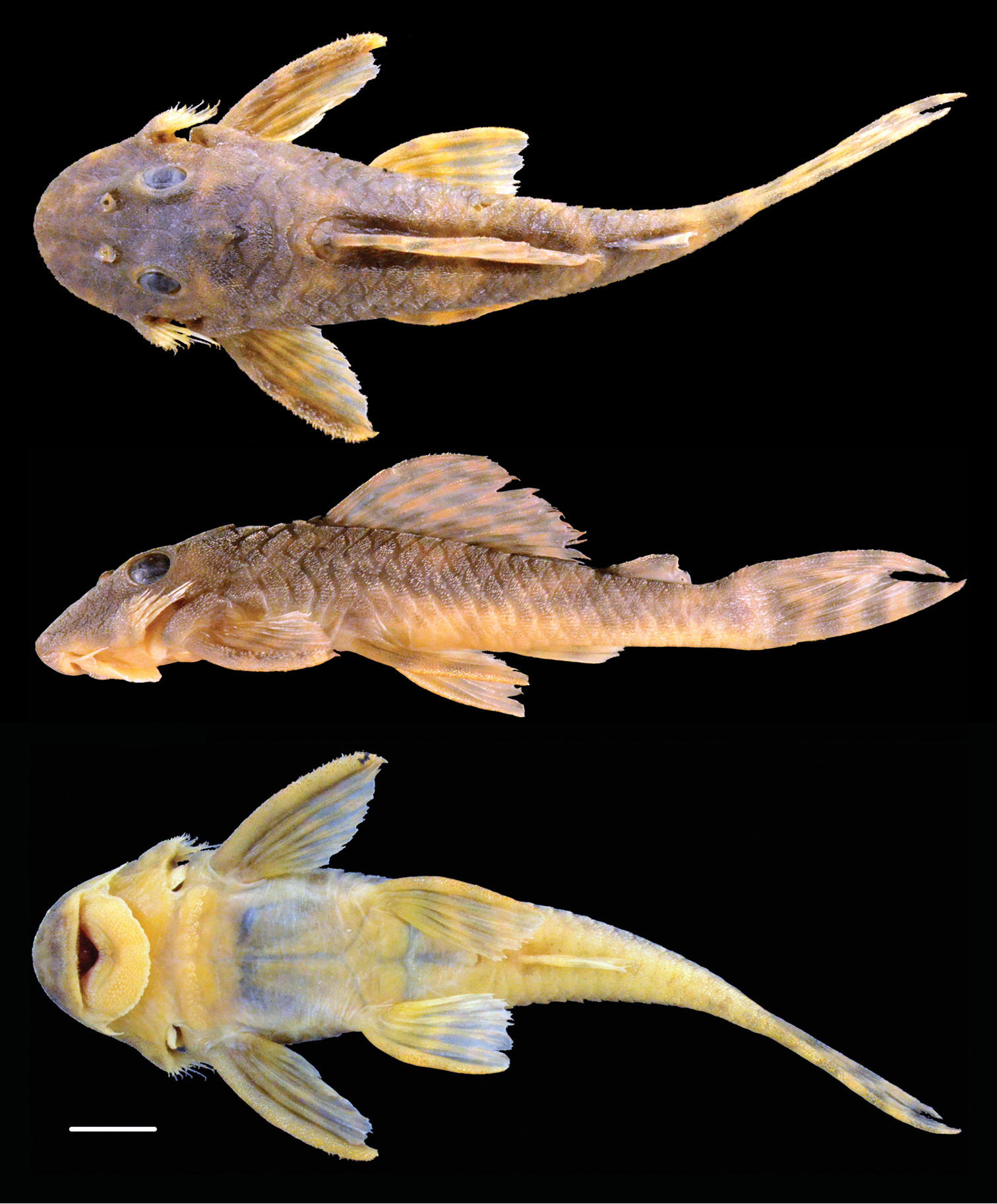
Dorsal, lateral, and ventral views of the holotype of P. lujani.

P. lujani was described in 2015 by Jonathan W. Armbruster (of Auburn University), David C. Werneke, and Milton Tan alongside two other species in the genus Peckoltia: P. greedoi and P. ephippiata. Its specific name honors Nathan K. Lujan, a former graduate student of Armbruster.

P. lujani is sometimes seen in the aquarium trade, where it is often referred to either as Lujan's pleco or by one of two associated L-numbers, which are L-127 and L-207. The species was known in the trade for quite some time prior to its official description, hence the presence of L-numbers associated with it.
