= Peckoltia simulata =

Conservation status
- Endangered (IUCN 3.1)

Scientific classification
- Kingdom: Animalia
- Phylum: Chordata
- Class: Actinopterygii
- Division: Teleostei
- Order: Siluriformes
- Family: Loricariidae
- Genus: Peckoltia
- Species: P. simulata

Binomial name
- Peckoltia simulata Fisch-Muller & Covain, 2012

Species of catfish

Peckoltia simulatais a species of freshwater ray-finned fish belonging to the family Loricariidae, the suckermouth armoured catfishes, and the subfamily Hypostominae, the suckermouth catfishes. This catfish occurs in the Oyapock River in French Guiana and the Brazilian state of Amapa. The species is found in small forested creeks with a substrate of gravel or sand, as well as rocks, leaves, and wood. It has been collected alongside a variety of other species, including other loricariids belonging to the genera Ancistrus, Farlowella, Guyanancistrus, Otocinclus and Rineloricaria.

P. simulata reaches a standard length of 8.3 cm (3.3 in). Its specific name, simulata, derives from a Latin word meaning "counterfeit", referring to its similarity to the closely related and previously described species P. oligospila.
