= Peckoltia multispinis =

Conservation status
- Data Deficient (IUCN 3.1)

Scientific classification
- Kingdom: Animalia
- Phylum: Chordata
- Class: Actinopterygii
- Division: Teleostei
- Order: Siluriformes
- Family: Loricariidae
- Subfamily: Hypostominae
- Genus: Peckoltia
- Species: P. multispinis

Binomial name
- Peckoltia multispinis (Holly, 1929)

Synonyms
- Ancistrus multispinis Holly, 1929; Lasiancistrus multispinis (Holly, 1929)

Species of fish

Peckoltia multispinis, commonly known as the bristlemouth catfish, is a species of small freshwater fish in the genus Peckoltia of the catfish family Loricariidae. It has the L-number L049. It is possibly a junior synonym for Peckoltia vittata (Steindachner, 1881). However, the online Encyclopedia of Life lists this fish as Lasiancistrus multispinis. The California Academy of Sciences lists Peckoltia multispinis as the currently correct name. This species is not to be confused with the valid but unrelated species Ancistrus multispinis, and although A. multispinis has been used as a name for both this species (now a member of Peckoltia) and the one it is currently used for, A. multispinis was initially described as a member of the now-invalid genus Xenocara and was classified under that genus when this species was first described as a member of Ancistrus. Because of this, Ancistrus multispinis is a valid name, but not one that should be used for P. multispinis.

== Description ==
Peckoltia multispinis grows to around 10 cm (3.9 inches) long. The greatest recorded length is 14.8 cm (5.8 inches). The lower lip has a short, multibranched fleshy fringe. It has a black and yellow striped or mottled pattern with large black eyes.

As they grow, males develop small tooth-like projections along the flanks of the back half of the body and on the leading rays of the pectoral fins. Females are wider across the body when viewed from above.

== Distribution ==
This species inhabits woody backwaters of the Rio Tocantins in the lower Amazon basin, in Brazil.

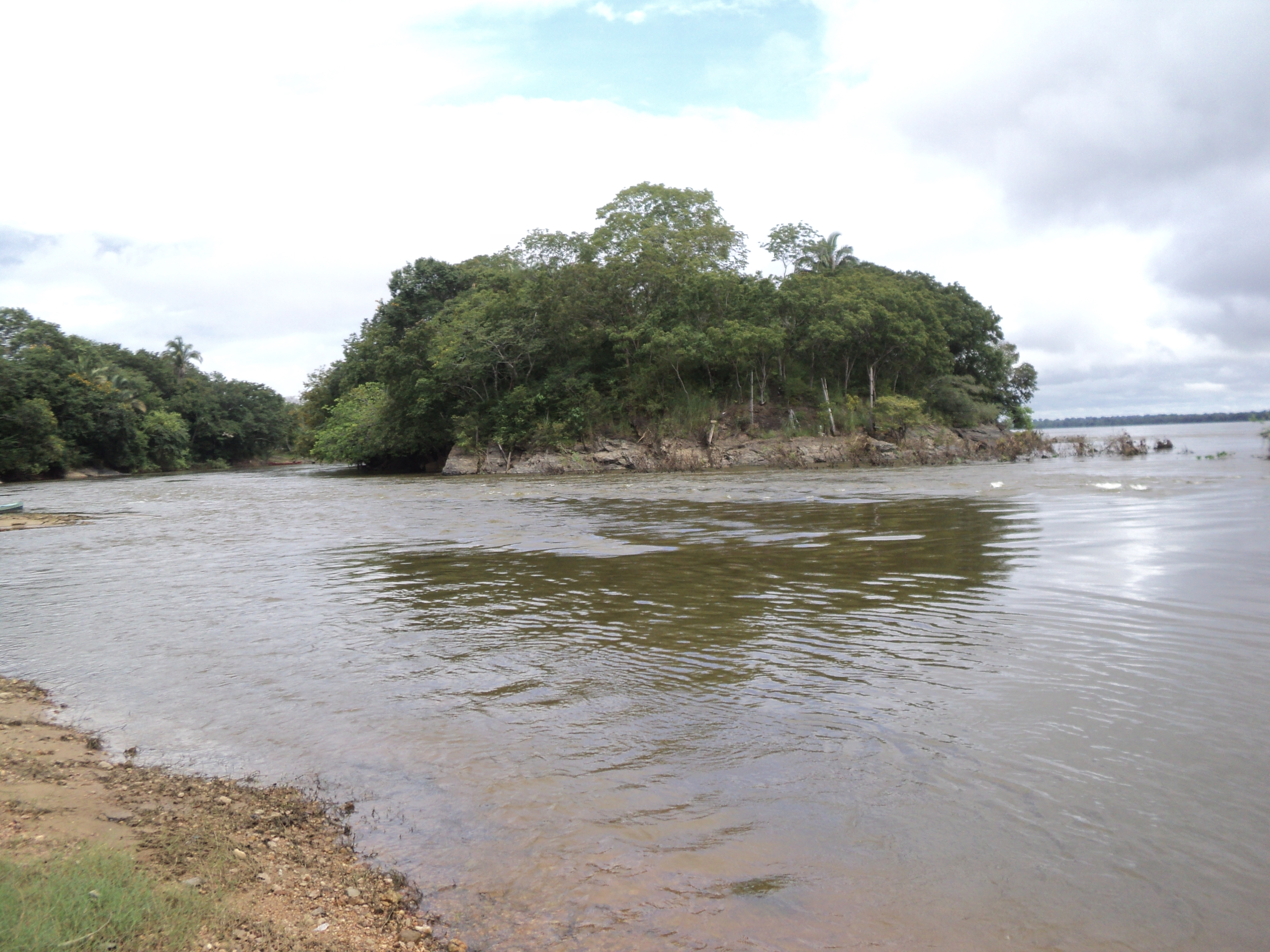

== In the aquarium ==
Peckoltia multispinis requires a soft water aquarium with waters of between 23 and 27 °C (73 and 81 °F) and a pH of around 6. It is described as non-aggressive in the aquarium but not effective at cleaning away algae.

There is no commercial fishery for this species, only the aquarium trade.
