= Isorineloricaria tenuicauda =

Conservation status
- Least Concern (IUCN 3.1)

Scientific classification
- Kingdom: Animalia
- Phylum: Chordata
- Class: Actinopterygii
- Order: Siluriformes
- Family: Loricariidae
- Genus: Isorineloricaria
- Species: I. tenuicauda

Binomial name
- Isorineloricaria tenuicauda (Steindachner, 1878)

Synonyms
- Plecostomus tenuicauda Steindachner, 1878; Hypostomus tenuicauda (Steindachner, 1878); Squaliforma tenuicauda (Steindachner, 1878); Plecostomus winzi Fowler, 1945; Hypostomus winzi (Fowler, 1945)

Species of catfish

Isorineloricaria tenuicauda is a species of catfish in the family Loricariidae. It is native to South America, where it occurs in the Magdalena River basin in Colombia. The species reaches 45 cm (18 in) in standard length, can weigh up to at least 960 g (2 lb 2 oz), and is believed to be a facultative air-breather.

Isorineloricaria tenuicauda was originally described as a member of Plecostomus by Franz Steindachner in 1878, although it was subsequently transferred to Hypostomus after Plecostomus was found to be an invalid genus. It was later classified within the now-invalid genus Squaliforma, although a 2016 taxonomic review of the genera Aphanotorulus and Isorineloricaria conducted by Jonathan W. Armbruster (of Auburn University) and C. Keith Ray found it to be a member of Isorineloricaria.
