= Isorineloricaria acuarius =

Conservation status
- Least Concern (IUCN 3.1)

Scientific classification
- Kingdom: Animalia
- Phylum: Chordata
- Class: Actinopterygii
- Order: Siluriformes
- Family: Loricariidae
- Genus: Isorineloricaria
- Species: I. acuarius

Binomial name
- Isorineloricaria acuarius Ray & Armbruster, 2016

Species of catfish

Isorineloricaria acuarius is a species of catfish in the family Loricariidae. It is native to South America, where it occurs in the Apure River basin in Venezuela. The species reaches at least 26.9 cm (10.6 in) in standard length. It was described in 2016 as part of a taxonomic review of the genera Aphanotorulus and Isorineloricaria conducted by Jonathan W. Armbruster and C. Keith Ray.
