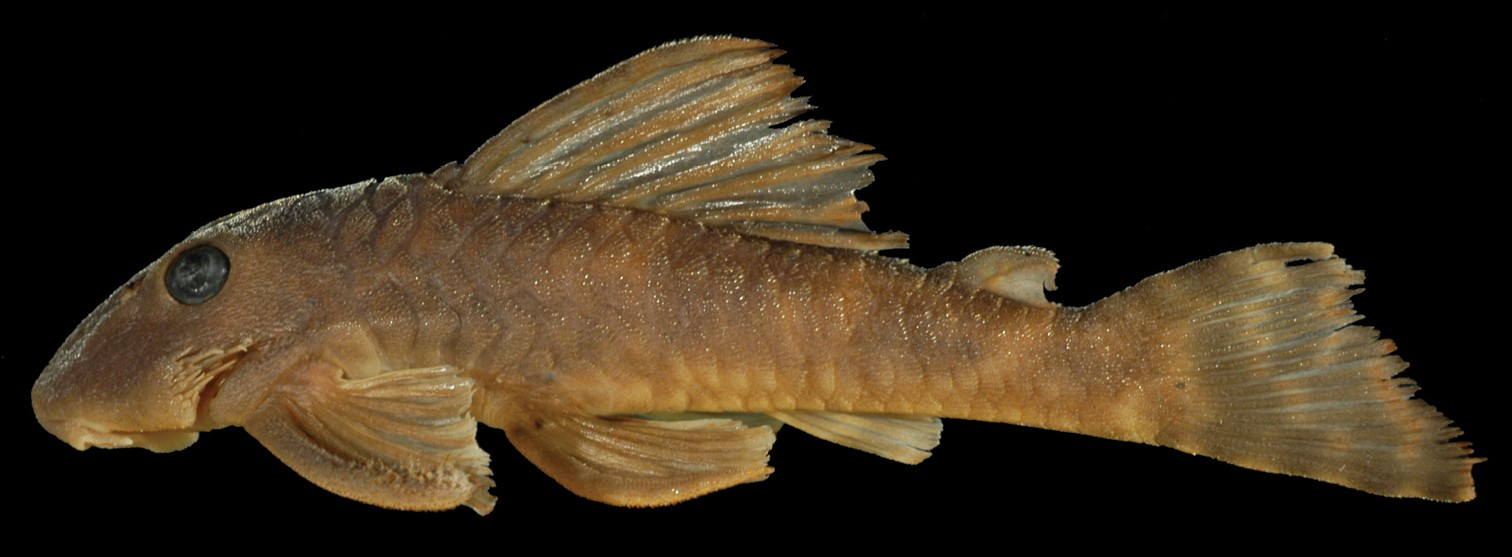

Scientific classification
- Kingdom: Animalia
- Phylum: Chordata
- Class: Actinopterygii
- Division: Teleostei
- Order: Siluriformes
- Family: Loricariidae
- Genus: Peckoltia
- Species: P. ephippiata

Binomial name
- Peckoltia ephippiata Armbruster, Werneke & Tan, 2015

= Peckoltia ephippiata =

Species of catfish

Peckoltia ephippiata is a species of freshwater ray-finned fish belonging to the family Loricariidae, the suckermouth armoured catfishes, and the subfamily Hypostominae, the suckermouth catfishes. This catfish is found in South America, where it is known from the Leitão River, which is part of the Madeira River drainage in the state of Rôndonia in Brazil. The species reaches a standard length of 10.2 cm (4.0 in).

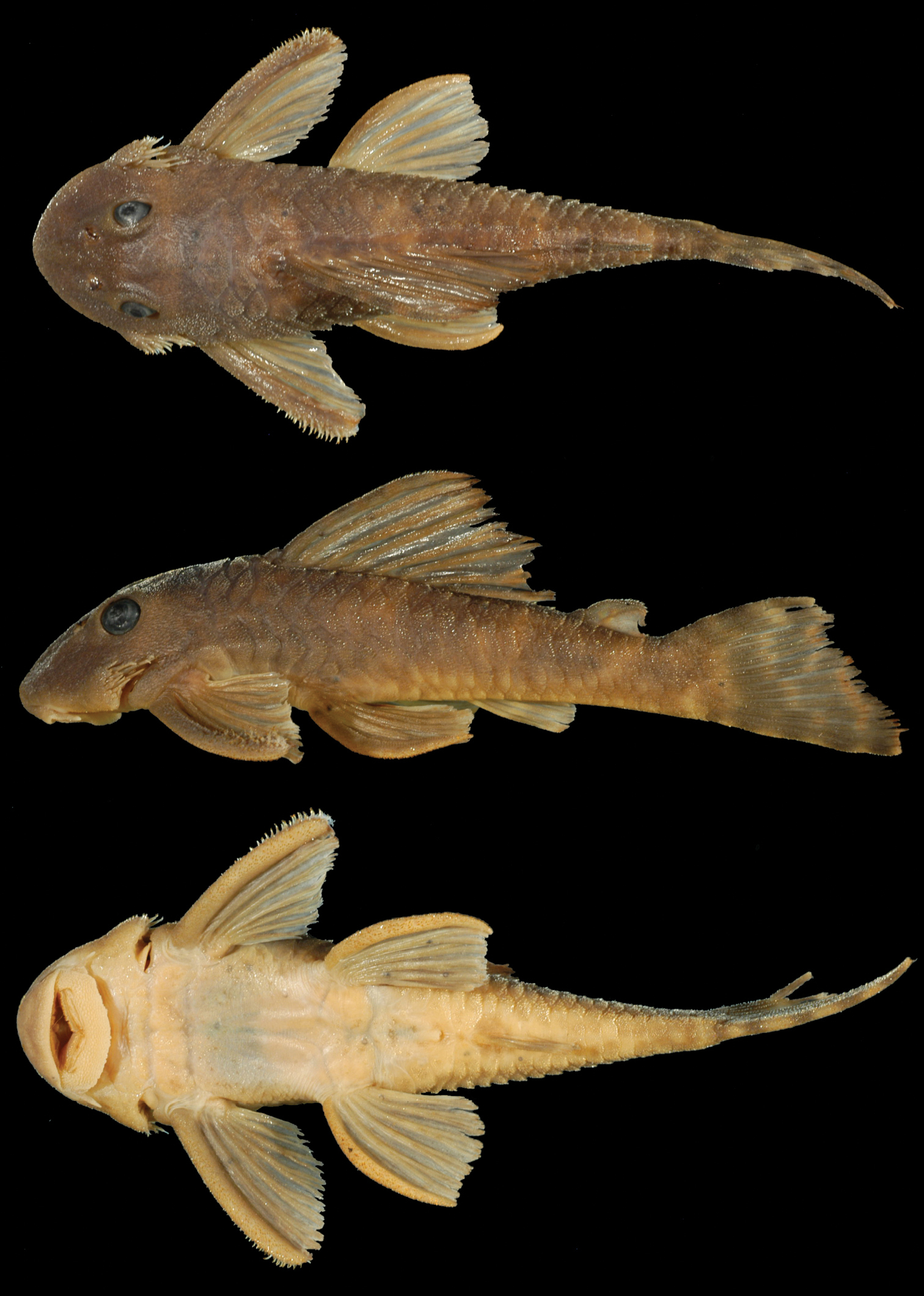
Dorsal, lateral, and ventral views of the holotype of P. ephippiata.

Its specific epithet, ephippiata, derives from the Latin word for "saddle" and refers to the saddle-like patterns exhibited by the species. It was described in 2015 by Jonathan W. Armbruster (of Auburn University), David C. Werneke, and Milton Tan alongside two other "saddled" members of the genus Peckoltia: P. greedoi and P. lujani.
