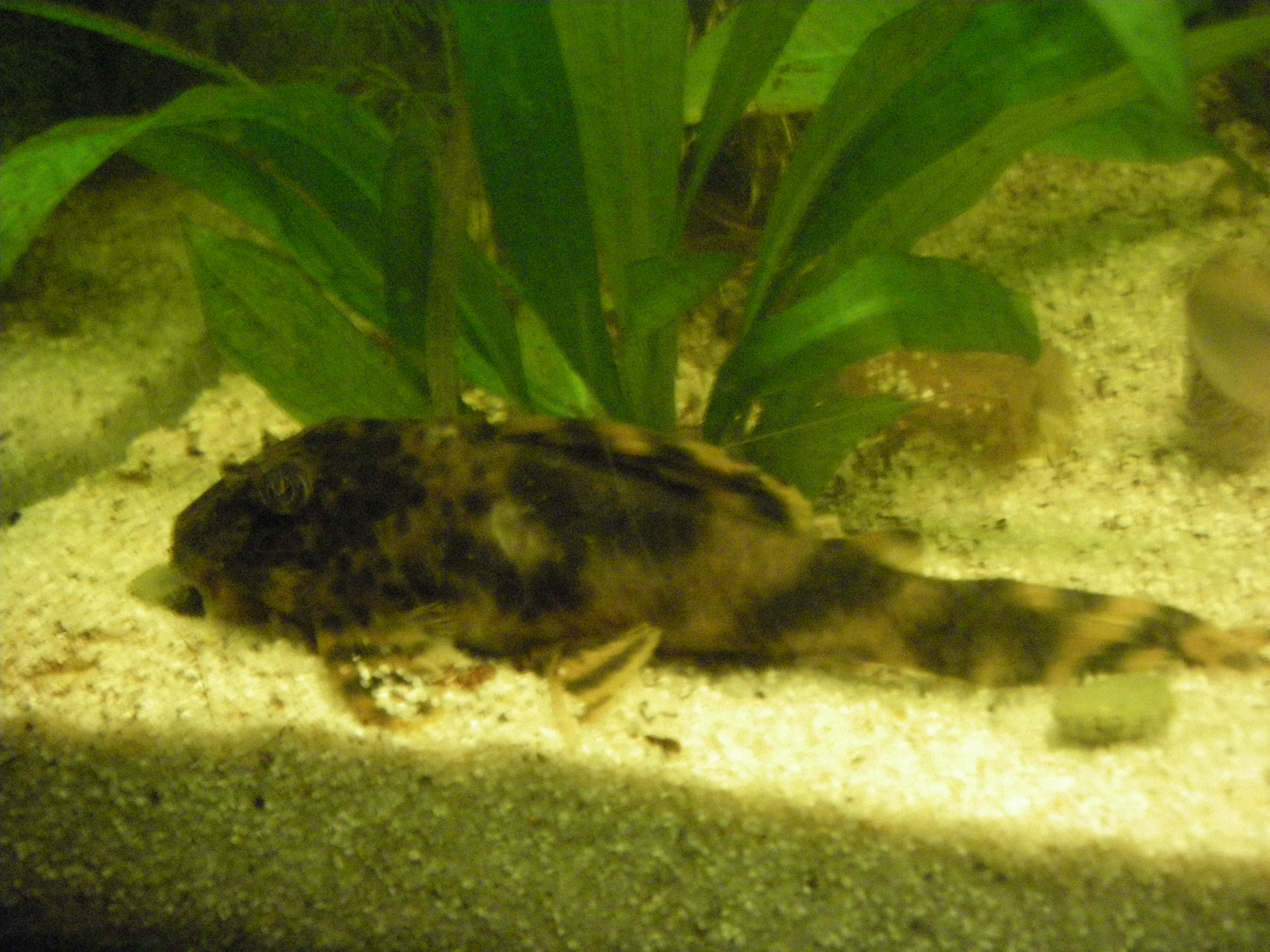

Conservation status
- Least Concern (IUCN 3.1)

Scientific classification
- Kingdom: Animalia
- Phylum: Chordata
- Class: Actinopterygii
- Division: Teleostei
- Order: Siluriformes
- Family: Loricariidae
- Subfamily: Hypostominae
- Genus: Peckoltia
- Species: P. brevis

Binomial name
- Peckoltia brevis (La Monte, 1935)

Synonyms
- Hemiancistrus brevis La Monte, 1935

= Peckoltia brevis =

Species of fish

Peckoltia brevis is a species of freshwater ray-finned fish belonging to the family Loricariidae, the suckermouth armoured catfishes, and the subfamily Hypostominae, the suckermouth catfishes. This catfish is found in South America.

== Taxonomy ==
Peckoltia brevis was first formally described as Hemiancistrus brevis in 1935 by the American ichthyologist Francesca LaMonte with its type locality given as near Sena Madureira, near the mouth of the Macauã River, tributary of Iaco, itself a tributary to the Purus,in the Brazilian state of Amazonas. Some authorities regard the genus Peckoltia as being within the tribe Ancistrini of the subfamily Hypostominae, but Eschmeyer's Catalog of Fishes does not recognise tribes within the subfamily Hypostominae.

== Description ==
Peckoltia brevisreaches a standard length of 11.4 cm (4.5 in). There are long odontodes, which can be everted, on the cheeks. There are three plates between the nape and the origin of the dorsal fin and the ventral surface is entirely covered in small plates. There are five rows of plates on the caudal peduncle. The teeth are unspecialised. They typically have a spotted head and fins with dark saddles or bars on a tan body, these bars may be broken up creating a rather mottled appearance. They are sexually dimorphic with the males developing short odontodes along the front margin of the pectoral fins and the area of the body immediately to the rear of the operculum, running the full length of the body and on the rays of the caudal fin. These are absent in females.

== Distribution ==
Peckoltia brevis is found in Bolivia, Brazil, Colombia, Peru and Venezuela where it is known from the Juruá, Japurá, Purus, Madeira, Marañon, upper Amazon and Orinoco rivers.

== Utilisation ==
Peckoltia brevis is used in the aquarium trade, it is reputed to be an unfussy fish which is safe with smaller fish and able to live with some larger fishes. This species is known as the Purus tiger pleco or by the L-number LDA078 in that trade.
