= Peckoltia caenosa =

Conservation status
- Least Concern (IUCN 3.1)

Scientific classification
- Kingdom: Animalia
- Phylum: Chordata
- Class: Actinopterygii
- Division: Teleostei
- Order: Siluriformes
- Family: Loricariidae
- Genus: Peckoltia
- Species: P. caenosa

Binomial name
- Peckoltia caenosa Armbruster, 2008

Species of catfish

Peckoltia caenosa is a species of freshwater ray-finned fish belonging to the family Loricariidae, the suckermouth armoured catfishes, and the subfamily Hypostominae, the suckermouth catfishes. Thhis catfish occurs in streams in the llanos of Venezuela that are part of the Orinoco drainage basin. The streams that it inhabits are typically slow-flowing and muddy, and the species is often seen hiding inside submerged hollow logs during the day. The species reaches a standard length of 15.7 cm (6.2 in). Its specific epithet is derived from a Latin word meaning "muddy" or "dirty", referring both to the species' mottled coloration and the muddy habitats in which it is found.

This species sometimes appears in the aquarium trade, where it is usually referred to either as the mud pleco or by one of two L-numbers associated with it, which are LDA-020 and LDA-021.
