= Aphanotorulus rubrocauda =

Scientific classification
- Kingdom: Animalia
- Phylum: Chordata
- Class: Actinopterygii
- Division: Teleostei
- Order: Siluriformes
- Family: Loricariidae
- Genus: Aphanotorulus
- Species: A. rubrocauda

Binomial name
- Aphanotorulus rubrocauda A. S. Oliveira, Py-Daniel & Zawadzki, 2017

Species of catfish

Aphanotorulus rubrocauda is a species of freshwater ray-finned fish belonging to the family Loricariidae, the suckermouth armored catfishes, and the subfamily Hypostominae, the suckermouth catfishes. This catfish is found in the tributaries of the Aripuanã basin, in the Brazilian states of Amazonas and Mato Grosso. This species can be identified by its color pattern with the caudal fin having an upper lobe which is mostly hyaline with dark spots along the fin rays and membranes, with the lower lobe being red and without dark spots, there are also no dark spots on the lateral series of mid-ventral plates. This species reaches astandard length of 24.1 cm (9.5 in).
