= Peckoltia amjikin =

Scientific classification
- Kingdom: Animalia
- Phylum: Chordata
- Class: Actinopterygii
- Division: Teleostei
- Order: Siluriformes
- Family: Loricariidae
- Genus: Peckoltia
- Species: P. amjikin

Binomial name
- Peckoltia amjikin de Araújo, Ferreira, Silva & Wosiacki, 2025

Species of fish

Peckoltia amjikin is a species of freshwater ray-finned fish belonging to the family Loricariidae, the suckermouth armoured catfishes, and the subfamily Hypostominae, the suckermouth catfishes. This catfish was first formally described in 2025 with its type locality given as Bom Jesus do Tocantins, on the Tocantins River in the Brazilian state of Pará at 5°20'11.9"S, 48°51'15.5"W. This species reaches a standard length of 64.8 mm (2.55 in). It has ill-defined blotches on lower surface with no blotches on the head; the odontodes on the cheeks are extending to the spine of the pectoral fin when lain against the body; the space between the eyes is not wholly covered by a blotch; there is no apparent crest; there are small plates with short odontodes at the bases of the pectoral fins, on the pectoral girdle and on the forward portion of the urogenital opening. It occurs over bedrock in moderate flows in the Tocantins-Araguaia system.
