= Peckoltia relictum =

Conservation status
- Least Concern (IUCN 3.1)

Scientific classification
- Kingdom: Animalia
- Phylum: Chordata
- Class: Actinopterygii
- Division: Teleostei
- Order: Siluriformes
- Family: Loricariidae
- Subfamily: Hypostominae
- Genus: Peckoltia
- Species: P. relictum

Binomial name
- Peckoltia relictum (Lujan, Armbruster & Rengifo, 2011)

Synonyms
- Etsaputu relictum Lujan, Armbruster & Rengifo, 2011

Species of fish

Peckoltia relictum is a species of freshwater ray-finned fish belonging to the family Loricariidae, the suckermouth armoured catfishes, and the subfamily Hypostominae, the suckermouth catfishes. This catfish is endemic to Peru where it is known from the upper Marañon River drainage, occurring in white water rivers and streams over sand and pebbles, feeding on periphyton.
