= Aphanotorulus horridus =

Conservation status
- Least Concern (IUCN 3.1)

Scientific classification
- Kingdom: Animalia
- Phylum: Chordata
- Class: Actinopterygii
- Division: Teleostei
- Order: Siluriformes
- Family: Loricariidae
- Genus: Aphanotorulus
- Species: A. horridus

Binomial name
- Aphanotorulus horridus (Kner, 1854)

Synonyms
- Hypostomus horridus Kner, 1854; Squaliforma horrida (Kner, 1854); Plecostomus scopularius Cope, 1871; Hypostomus scopularius (Cope, 1871); Squaliforma scopularia (Cope, 1871); Plecostomus biseriatus Cope, 1872; Hypostomus biseriatus (Cope, 1872); Squaliforma biseriata (Cope, 1872); Plecostomus virescens Cope, 1874; Hypostomus virescens (Cope, 1874); Squaliforma virescens (Cope, 1874)

Species of catfish

Aphanotorulus horridus belonging to the family Loricariidae, the suckermouth armored catfishes, and the subfamily Hypostominae, the suckermouth catfishes. The generic name "Aphanotorulus" is derived from greek word, aphanes, meaning hidden, and latin word, torulus, meaning muscle, little string. It is native to South America, where it occurs in the Madeira River basin. The species reaches 35.5 cm (14 in) SL. It is thought to be a facultative air-breather.

== Taxonomy and classification ==
A. horridus was originally described as Hypostomus horridus by Rudolf Kner in 1854, although it was transferred to the genus Squaliforma (now considered invalid) after the genus' designation by I. J. H. Isbrücker, I. Seidel, J. Michels, E. Schraml, and A. Werner in 2001. In 2004, Jonathan W. Armbruster classified the species within Hypostomus instead of Squaliforma. In 2016, following a review of Isorineloricaria and Aphanotorulus by C. Keith Ray and Armbruster (both of Auburn University), the species was reclassified as a member of Aphanotorulus. This 2016 review also found three other former Squaliforma species (S. biseriata, S. scopularia, and S. virescens) to be synonymous with A. horridus.

A. horridus sometimes appears in the aquarium trade, where it is typically referred to either as the long-head pleco or by one of two associated L-numbers, which are L-290 and L-291.

== Habitat ==
They are located in South America regions like Madeira River basin, Amazon, Middle Amazon (Solimoes), Madeira, Aripuanã, Upper Amazon, Marañón, Morona.
