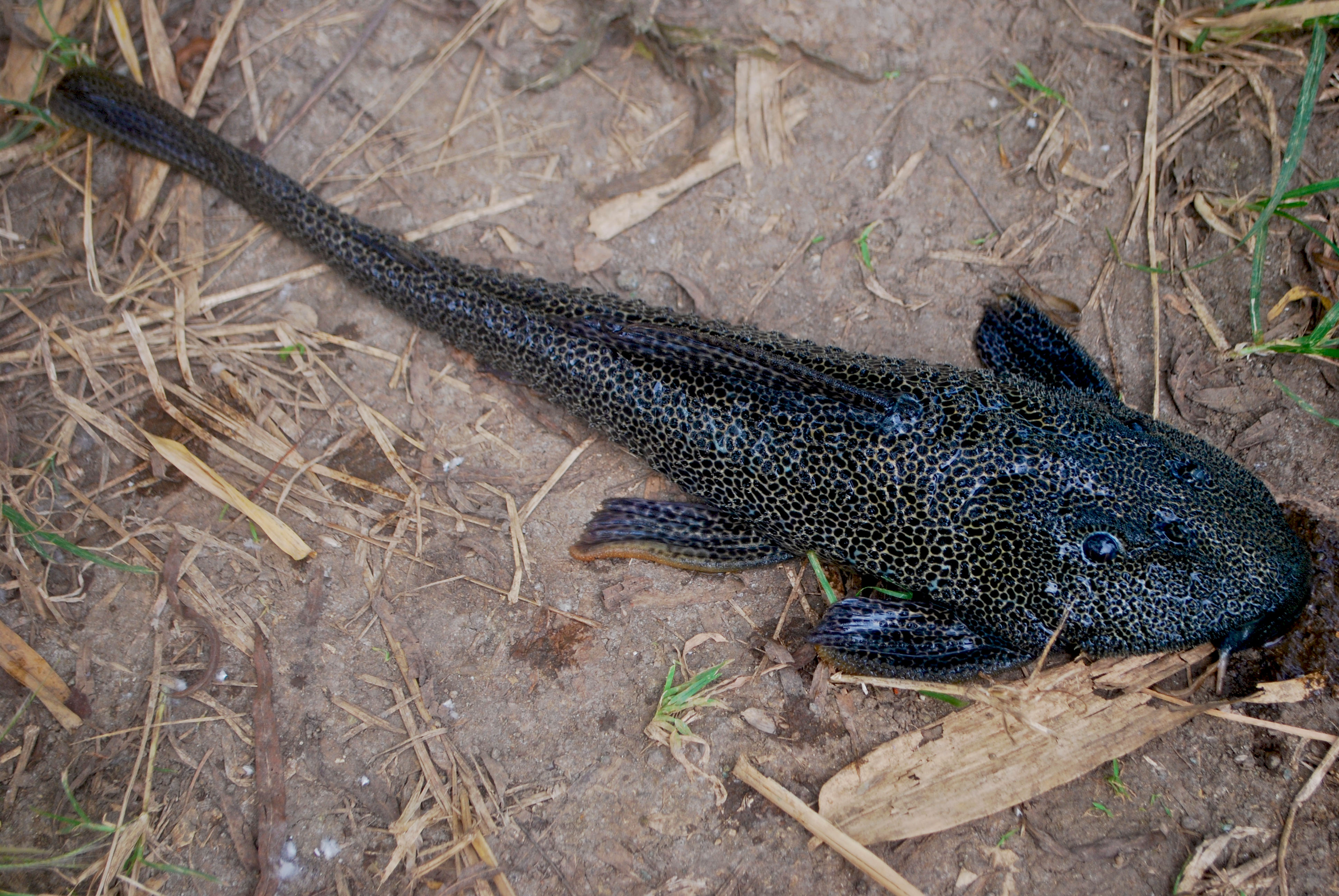

Scientific classification
- Domain: Eukaryota
- Kingdom: Animalia
- Phylum: Chordata
- Class: Actinopterygii
- Order: Siluriformes
- Family: Loricariidae
- Genus: Isorineloricaria
- Species: I. spinosissima

Binomial name
- Isorineloricaria spinosissima (Steindachner, 1880)

= Isorineloricaria spinosissima =

Species of fish

Isorineloricaria spinosissima, also known as the zucchini catfish, is a species of Loricariidae endemic to the Guayas River basin in western Ecuador. This species grows to a length of 56.5 centimetres (22.2 in) TL.
