= Peckoltia otali =

Conservation status
- Vulnerable (IUCN 3.1)

Scientific classification
- Kingdom: Animalia
- Phylum: Chordata
- Class: Actinopterygii
- Division: Teleostei
- Order: Siluriformes
- Family: Loricariidae
- Genus: Peckoltia
- Species: P. otali

Binomial name
- Peckoltia otali Fisch-Muller & Covain, 2012

Species of catfish

Peckoltia otali is a species of freshwater ray-finned fish belonging to the family Loricariidae, the suckermouth armoured catfishes, and the subfamily Hypostominae, the suckermouth catfishes. This fish is found in South America, where it occurs in the upper Maroni basin in French Guiana and Suriname. It is typically found in clear, shallow rapids with a substrate of medium-sized rocks. This species reaches a standard length of 7.7 cm (3.0 in). Its specific name, otali, derives from a Wayana word meaning "secret", which refers to the species' cryptic coloration, matching that of its habitat, making it difficult to observe.
