= Peckoltia lineola =

Conservation status
- Vulnerable (IUCN 3.1)

Scientific classification
- Kingdom: Animalia
- Phylum: Chordata
- Class: Actinopterygii
- Division: Teleostei
- Order: Siluriformes
- Family: Loricariidae
- Genus: Peckoltia
- Species: P. lineola

Binomial name
- Peckoltia lineola Armbruster, 2008

Species of catfish

Peckoltia lineola is a species of freshwater ray-finned fish belonging to the family Loricariidae, the suckermouth armoured catfishes, and the subfamily Hypostominae, the suckermouth catfishes. This fish is found in South America, where it occurs in the basins of the Ventuari River in Venezuela and maybe also in the Inírida River in Colombia. This species reaches a standard length of 9.7 cm (3.8 in) and is typically found in rocky riffles. Its specific epithet, lineola, derives from a Latin word meaning "line", referring to the lines present on the species' compound pterotic.

P. lineola appears in the aquarium trade, where it is most frequently referred to either as the shortlined pleco, as the Orinoco dwarf pleco, or by one of three associated L-numbers, which are L-202, LDA-057, and LDA-079.
