= Peckoltia capitulata =

Conservation status
- Critically Endangered (IUCN 3.1)

Scientific classification
- Kingdom: Animalia
- Phylum: Chordata
- Class: Actinopterygii
- Division: Teleostei
- Order: Siluriformes
- Family: Loricariidae
- Genus: Peckoltia
- Species: P. capitulata

Binomial name
- Peckoltia capitulata Fisch-Muller & Covain, 2012

Species of catfish

Peckoltia capitulata is a species of freshwater ray-finned fish belonging to the family Loricariidae, the suckermouth armoured catfishes, and the subfamily Hypostominae, the suckermouth catfishes. This catfish is found in South America where it is only known from the Approuague River in French Guiana. The species was initially collected from a part of the river with a swift, strong current, which was unusually turbid at the time due to illegal gold mining activities in the area.

The species reaches a size of 7.6 cm (3 inches) standard length (SL). Its specific epithet, capitulata, is derived from Latin and refers to the species characteristically small head.
