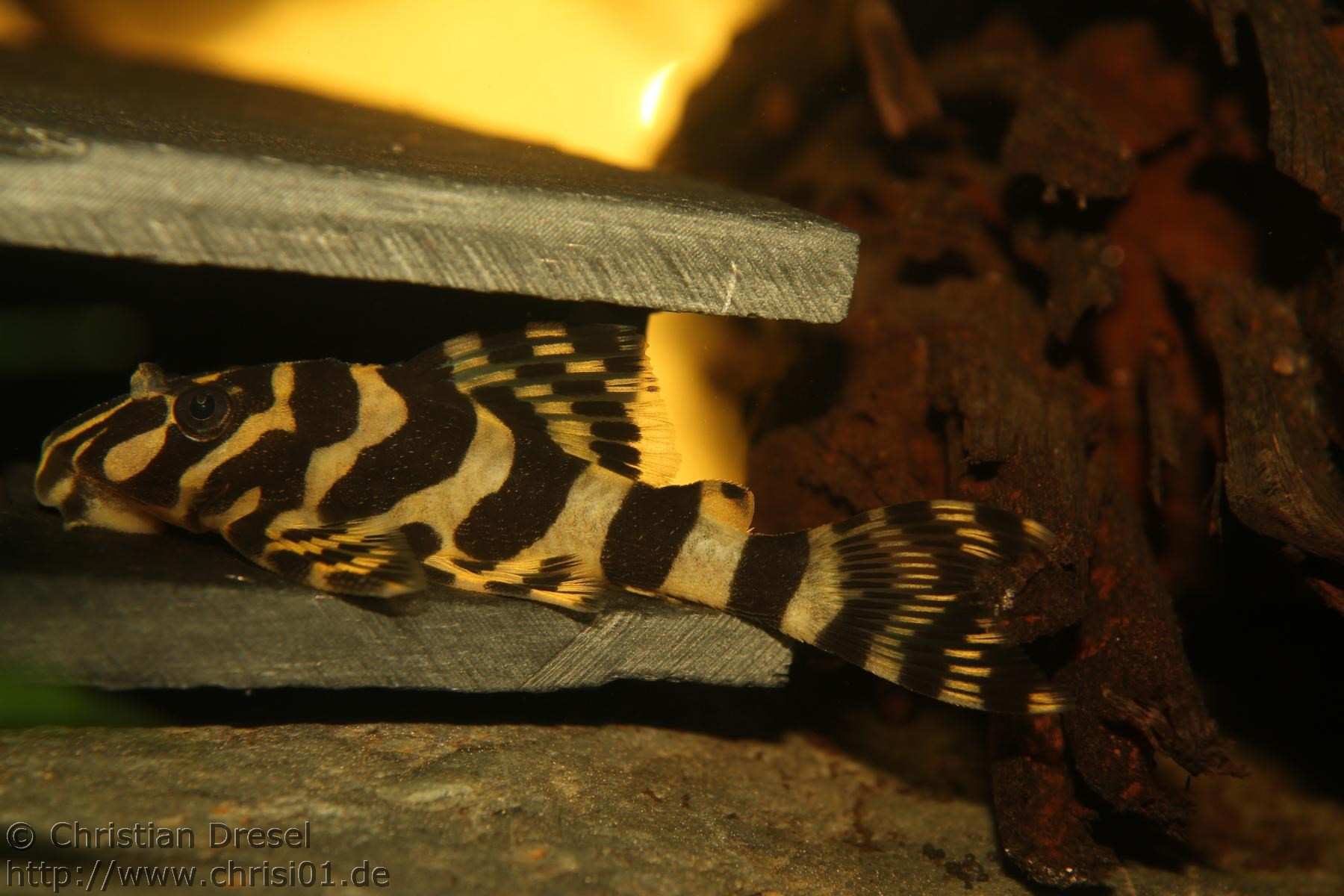

Conservation status
- Endangered (IUCN 3.1)

Scientific classification
- Kingdom: Animalia
- Phylum: Chordata
- Class: Actinopterygii
- Division: Teleostei
- Order: Siluriformes
- Family: Loricariidae
- Genus: Peckoltia
- Species: P. compta

Binomial name
- Peckoltia compta de Oliveira, Zuanon, Rapp Py-Daniel & Rocha, 2010

= Peckoltia compta =

Species of catfish

Peckoltia compta is a species of freshwater ray-finned fish belonging to the family Loricariidae, the suckermouth armoured catfishes, and the subfamily Hypostominae, the suckermouth catfishes. This catfish is found in South America, where it occurs in the Tapajós basin in Brazil. The species reaches a standard length of 6.2 cm (2.4 in). It was described in 2010 by Renildo Ribeiro de Oliveira and Jansen Zuanon (of the National Institute of Amazonian Research), Lúcia Rapp Py-Daniel, and Marcelo Salles Rocha (of Amazonas State University) primarily on the basis of coloration and patterning. Its specific epithet, compta, is stated to be derived from the Latin word for "adorned" or "ornamented", referring to the species' distinctive color pattern.

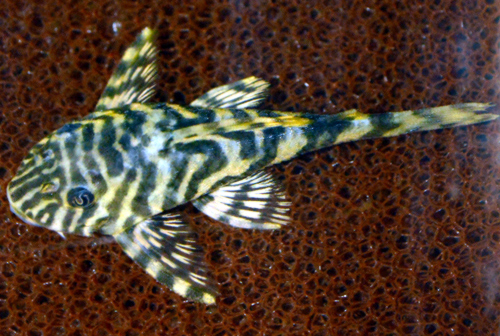
A specimen of P. compta.

P. compta appears in the aquarium trade, where it is referred to either as the leopard frog pleco or by its associated L-number, which is L-134.

The International Union for Conservation of Nature have assessed Peckoltia compta as Endangered because is habitat and population have been severely affected, and more are proposed, by hydroelectric projects.
