= Peckoltia cavatica =

Conservation status
- Endangered (IUCN 3.1)

Scientific classification
- Kingdom: Animalia
- Phylum: Chordata
- Class: Actinopterygii
- Division: Teleostei
- Order: Siluriformes
- Family: Loricariidae
- Genus: Peckoltia
- Species: P. cavatica

Binomial name
- Peckoltia cavatica Armbruster & Werneke, 2005

Species of catfish

Peckoltia cavatica is a species of freshwater ray-finned fish belonging to the family Loricariidae, the suckermouth armoured catfishes, and the subfamily Hypostominae, the suckermouth catfishes. It is found in South America, where it occurs in the Rupununi basin in Guyana. It is found in areas with large amounts of lateritic rock, and it is usually seen in holes and caves within the rock, which are also where it is thought to breed. P. cavatica's preference for such environments was notable enough to the authors of its 2005 description, Jonathan W. Armbruster and David C. Werneke, that the specific epithet bestowed upon it means "living in caves" in Latin. The species reaches 7.2 cm (2.8 in) SL.

P. cavatica appears in the aquarium trade, where it may be referred to and marketed by the L-number of L-076, although not all sources are in agreement that the number in question corresponds to P. cavatica.
