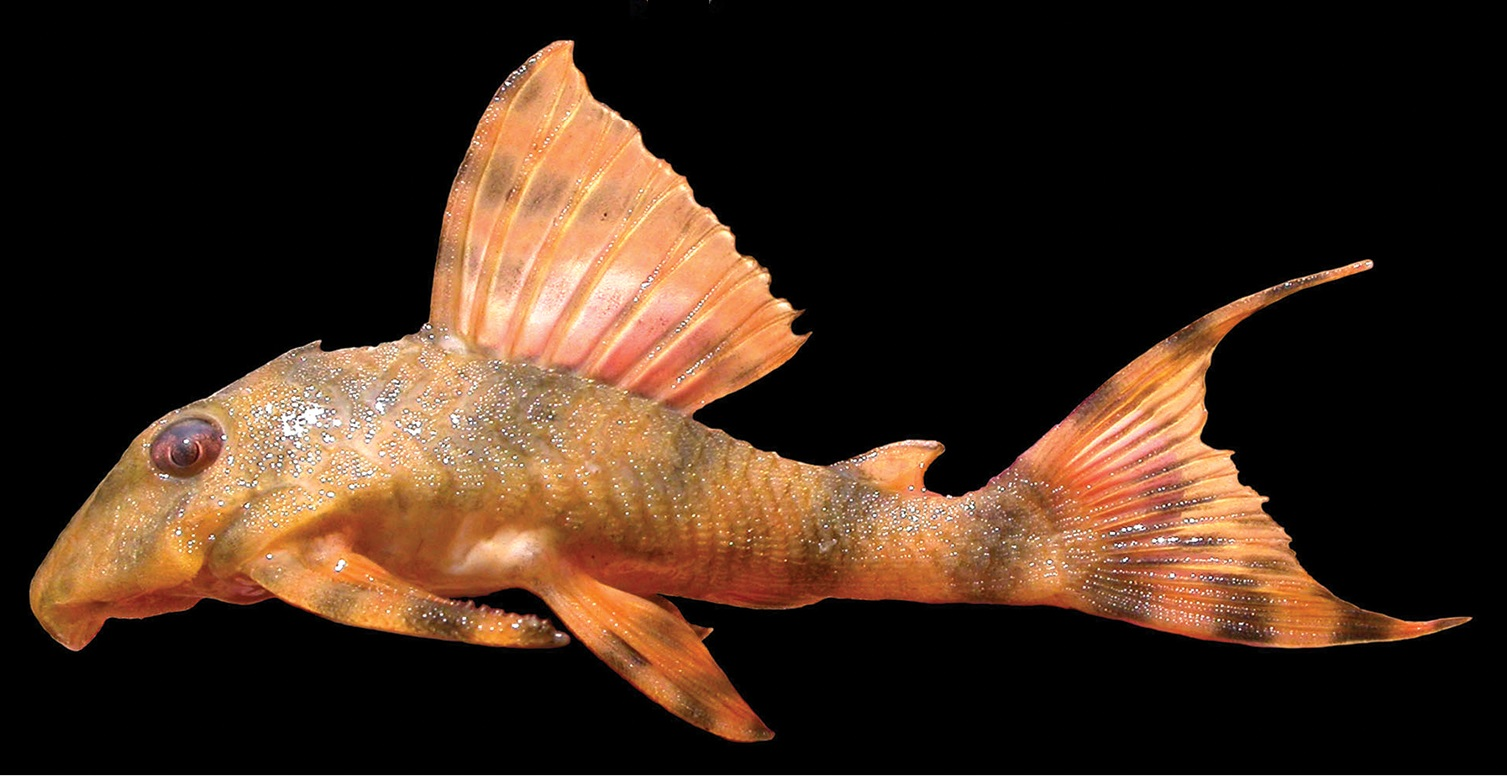

Conservation status
- Near Threatened (IUCN 3.1)

Scientific classification
- Kingdom: Animalia
- Phylum: Chordata
- Class: Actinopterygii
- Division: Teleostei
- Order: Siluriformes
- Family: Loricariidae
- Genus: Peckoltia
- Species: P. wernekei

Binomial name
- Peckoltia wernekei Armbruster & Lujan, 2016

= Peckoltia wernekei =

Species of catfish

Peckoltia wernekei is a species of freshwater ray-finned fish belonging to the family Loricariidae, the suckermouth armoured catfishes, and the subfamily Hypostominae, the suckermouth catfishes. This fish is found in South America, where it occurs in the Ventuari and Manapiare rivers on the Guiana Shield in the upper Orinoco drainage in Amazonas, Venezuela. The species reaches a standard length of 10.5 cm (4.1 in).

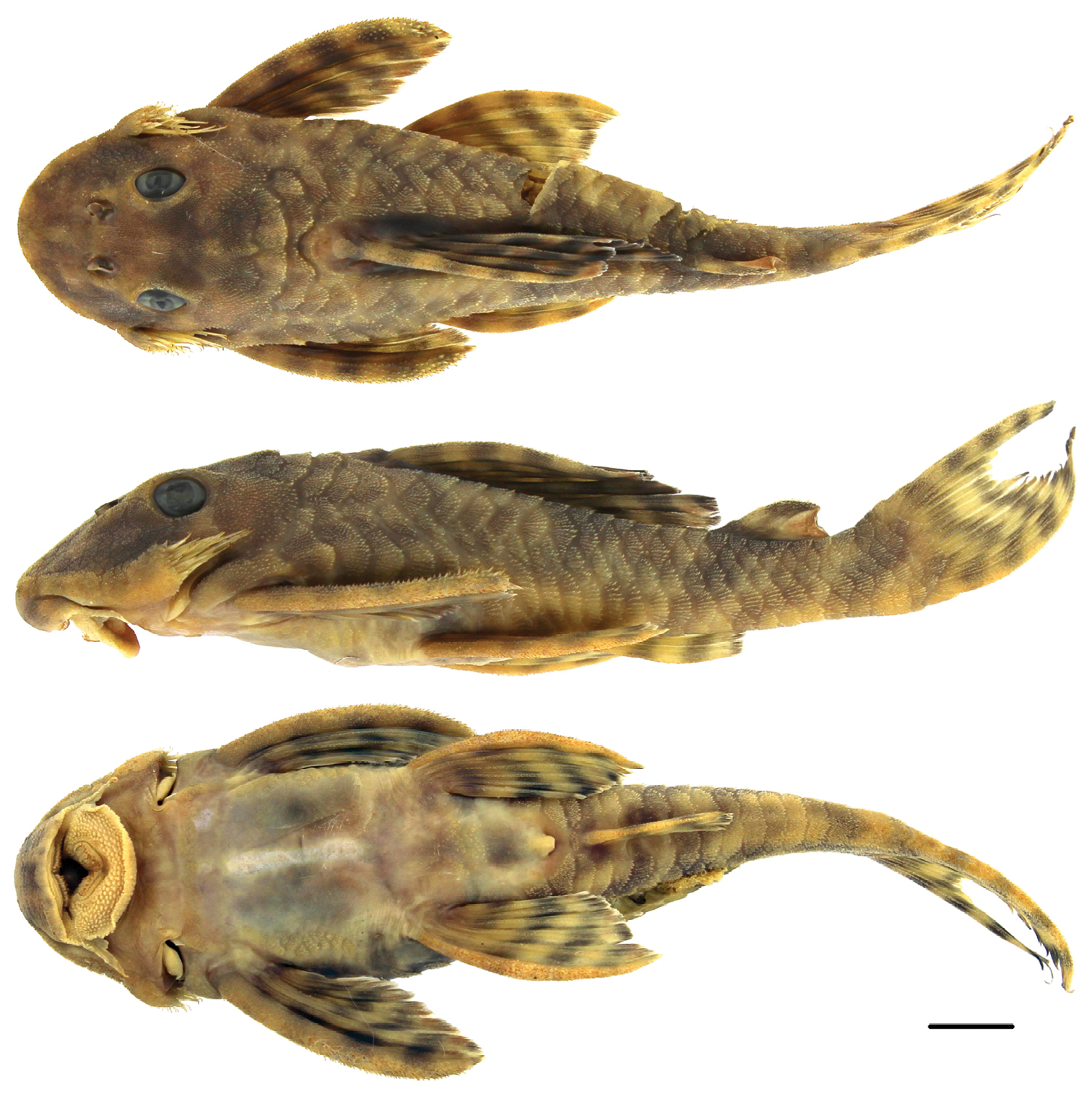
Dorsal, lateral, and ventral views of the holotype of P. wernekei

Peckoltia wernekei was first described in 2016 by the ichthyologists Jonathan W. Armbruster and Nathan K. Lujan, based on morphological and genetic differences between it and other members of Peckoltia, including P. vittata, which it was formerly considered to be conspecific with. Its specific name wernekei, honors David C. Werneke, collection manager of fishes at Auburn University for his "diligence, camaraderie and humor" during three expeditions he joined in the upper basin of the Orinoco.

P. wernekei occasionally appears in the aquarium trade, where it is referred to either as the orange tiger pleco or by one of two associated L-numbers, which are L-243 and LDA-086.
