= Peckoltia furcata =

Conservation status
- Least Concern (IUCN 3.1)

Scientific classification
- Kingdom: Animalia
- Phylum: Chordata
- Class: Actinopterygii
- Division: Teleostei
- Order: Siluriformes
- Family: Loricariidae
- Genus: Peckoltia
- Species: P. furcata

Binomial name
- Peckoltia furcata (Fowler, 1940)

Synonyms
- Chaetostomus furcatus Fowler, 1940; Chaetostomus furcatus Fowler, 1940

Species of catfish

Peckoltia furcata is a species of freshwater ray-finned fish belonging to the family Loricariidae, the suckermouth armoured catfishes, and the subfamily Hypostominae, the suckermouth catfishes. This catfish is found in South America, where it occurs in the Marañon and Ucayali river basins in Peru and in the Napo-Pastaza river basin in Ecuador. This species reaches a total length of 12 cm (4.7 in).
