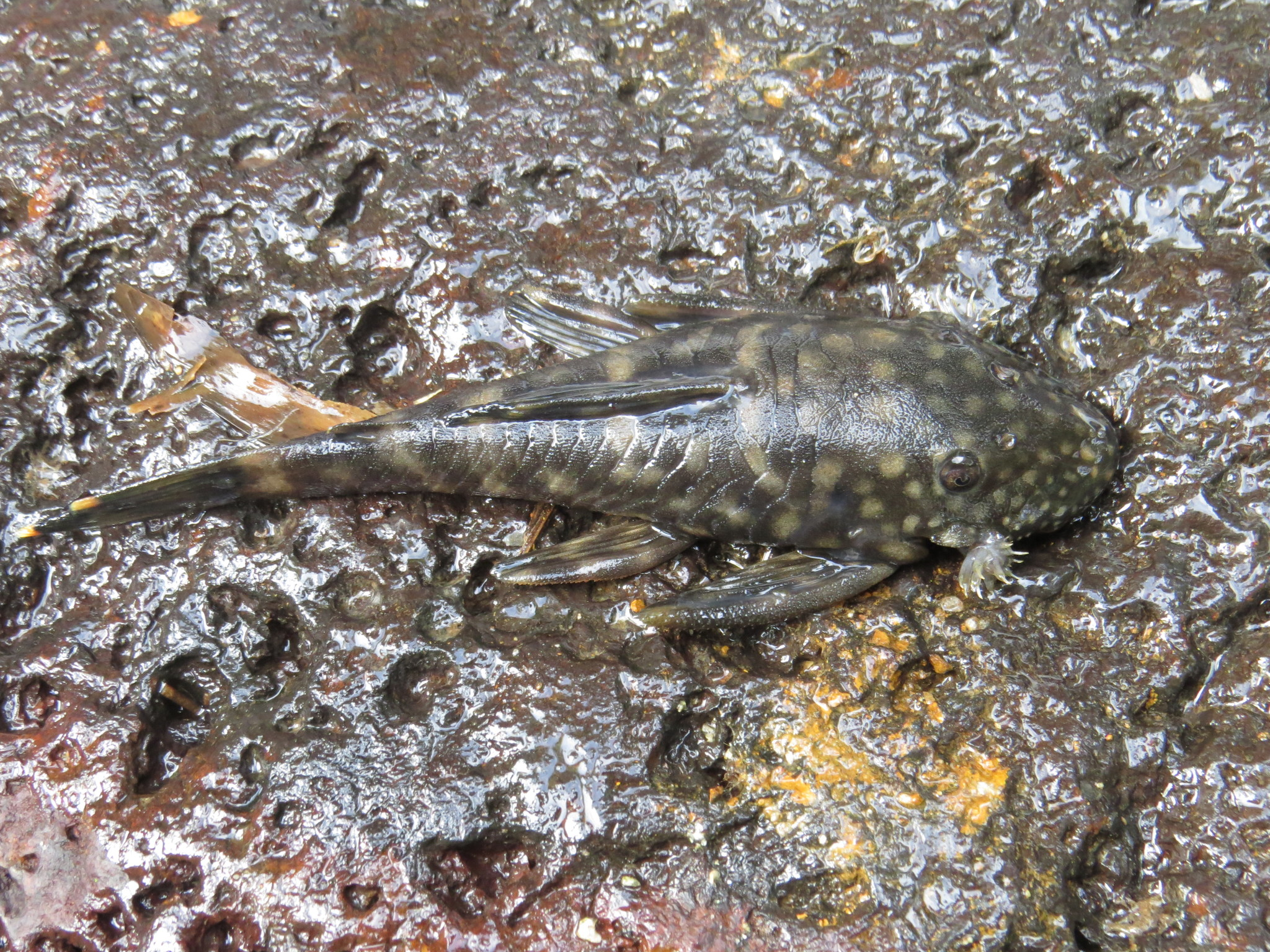

Conservation status
- Least Concern (IUCN 3.1)

Scientific classification
- Kingdom: Animalia
- Phylum: Chordata
- Class: Actinopterygii
- Order: Siluriformes
- Family: Loricariidae
- Genus: Ancistrus
- Species: A. multispinis

Binomial name
- Ancistrus multispinis (Regan, 1912)

Synonyms
- Cenocara multispinis Regan, 1912; Hemiancistrus albocinctus Ahl, 1936; Peckoltia albocinctus (Ahl, 1936); Ancistrus albocinctus (Ahl, 1936)

= Ancistrus multispinis =

Species of catfish

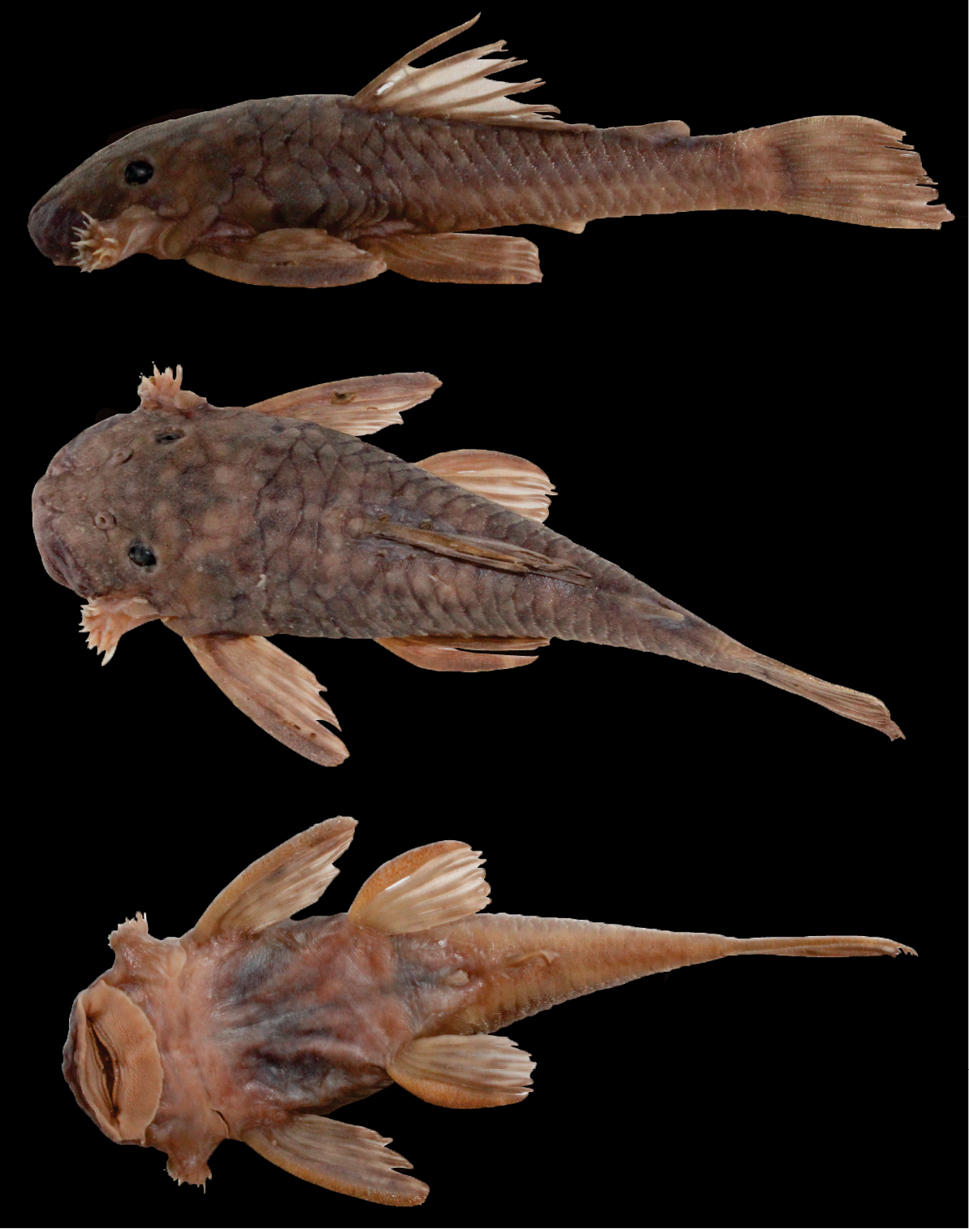
Preserved specimen

Ancistrus multispinis is a species of freshwater ray-finned fish belonging to the family Loricariidae, the suckermouth armoured catfishes, and the subfamily Hypostominae, the suckermouth catfishes. This catfish is endemic to Brazil.

== Taxonomy ==
Ancistrus multispinis was first formally described in 2009 by the British ichthyologist Charles Tate Regan with its type locality given as the Humboldt River, the Itapocu River, in the Brazilian state of Santa Catarina. Eschmeyer's Catalog of Fishes classified the genus Ancistrus in the subfamily Hypostominae, the suckermouth catfishes, within the suckermouth armored catfish family Loricariidae. It has also been classified in the tribe Ancistrini by some authorities.

== Etymology ==
Ancistrus multispinis is classified in the genus Ancistrus, a name coined by Rudolf Kner but when he proposed the genus Kner did not explain the etymology of the name. It is thought to be from the Greek ágkistron, meaning a "fish hook" or the "hook of a spindle", a reference to the hooked odontodes on the interopercular bone. The specific name, multispinis, means "many thorns", an allusion to the many spines on the interopercular.

== Description ==
Ancistrus multispinis reaches a standard length of 14.2 cm (5.6 in). This species has between 20 and 25 spines on the interopercular. Ancistrus species develop soft, bushy tentacles on the snout when sexually mature, these are better developed in the males than they are in females.

== Distribution and habitat ==
Ancistrus multispinis is endemic to southeastern Brazil where it can be found in the coastal drainages between the Macacu River draiange and the Maquiné River in the states of Rio de Janeiro, Sao Paulo, Paraná, Santa Catarina and Rio Grande do Sul. It is found in stretches with a bed consisting of gravel and pebbles, with the flow determined by rainfall where there are moderate to fast currents.

== Utilisation ==
Ancistrus multispinis is part of the aquarium trade. With nocturnal habits, the species has been used in studies on the impacts of deltamethrin on fish blood in Brazil.
