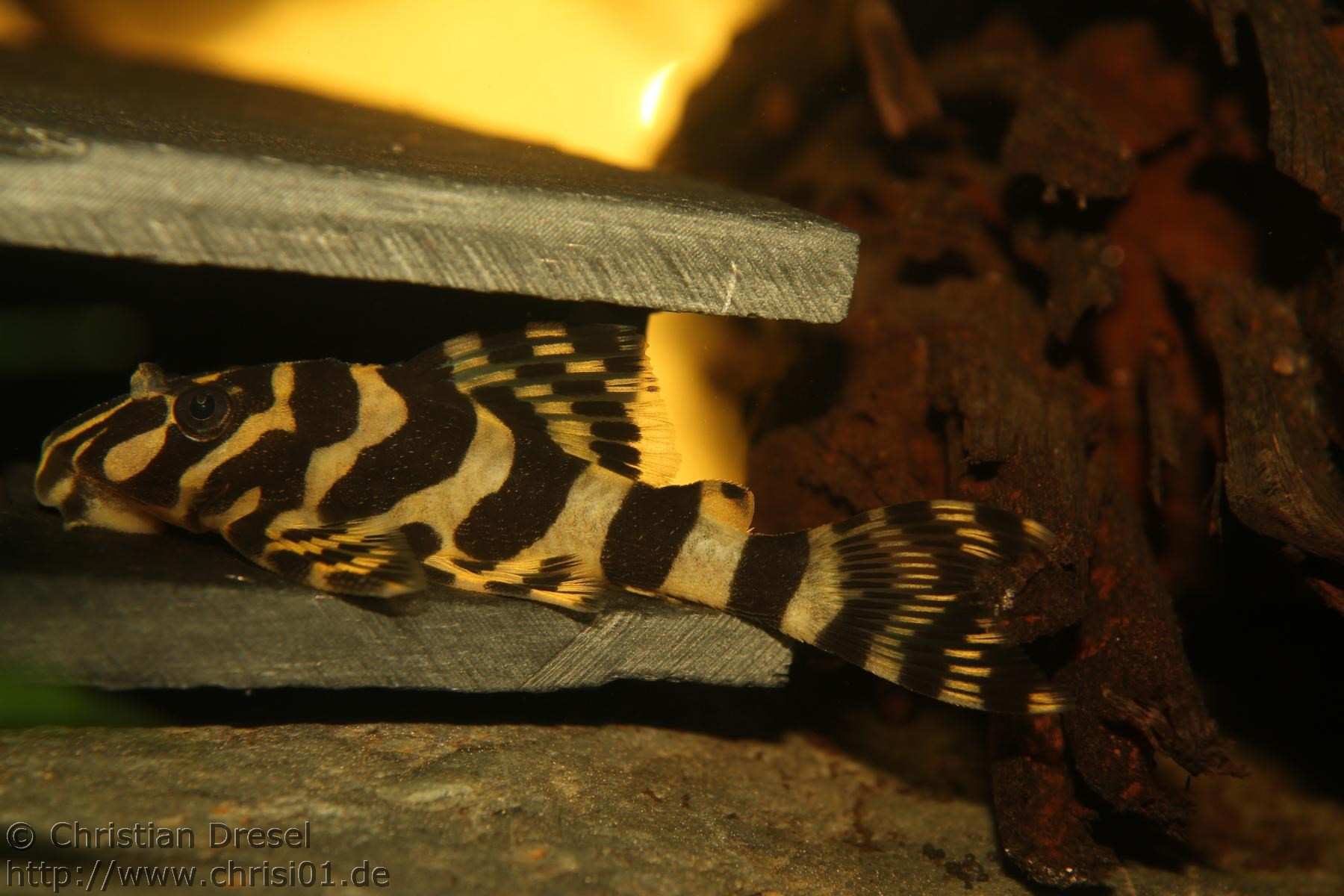
- Peckoltia compta
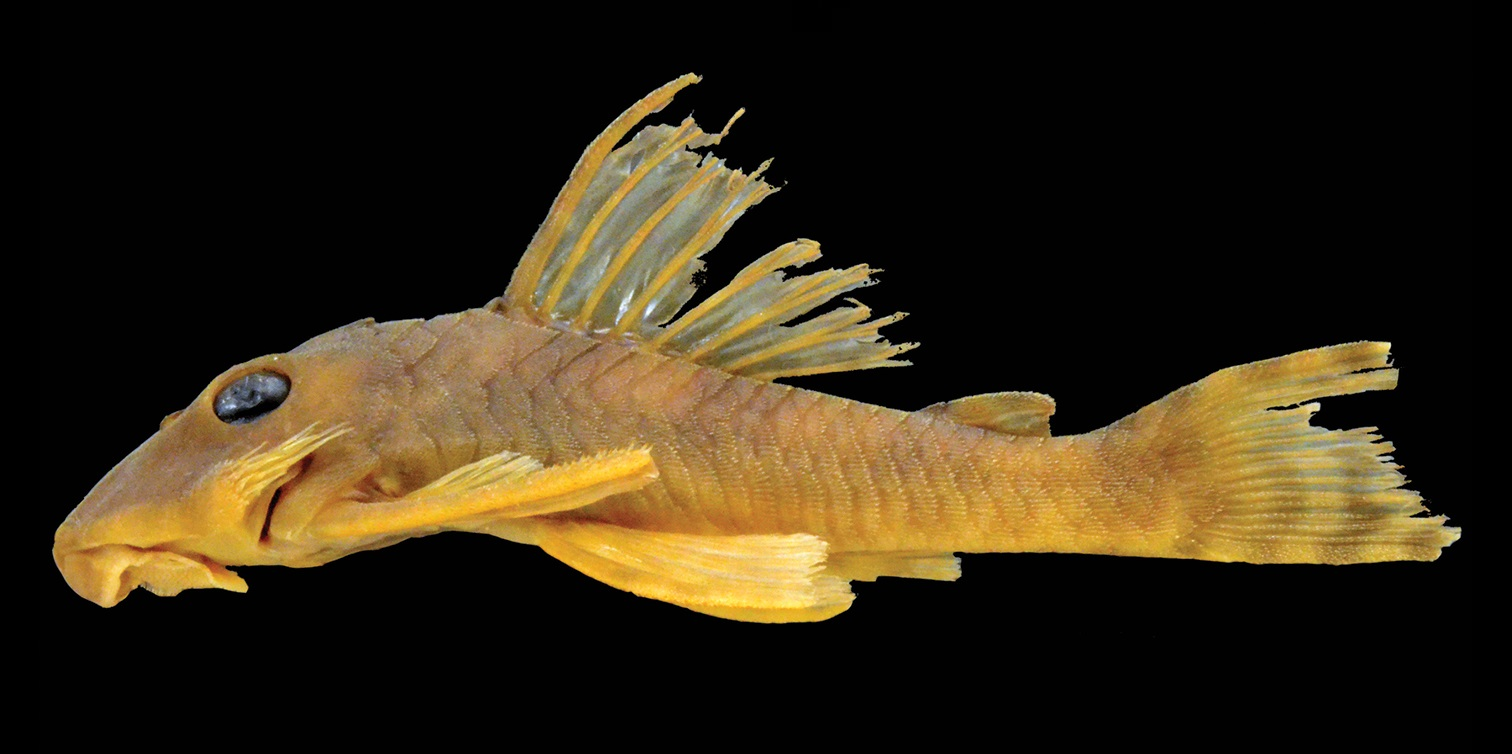
- Peckoltia greedoi

Scientific classification
- Kingdom: Animalia
- Phylum: Chordata
- Class: Actinopterygii
- Division: Teleostei
- Order: Siluriformes
- Family: Loricariidae
- Subfamily: Hypostominae
- Genus: Peckoltia; A. Miranda-Ribeiro, 1912

Type species
- Chaetostomus vittatus Steindachner, 1881

Synonyms
- Sophiancistrus Isbrücker & Seidel, 2001; Etsaputu Lujan, Armbruster & Rengifo, 2011

= Peckoltia =

Genus of fishes

Peckoltia is a genus of freshwater ray-finned fishes belonging to the family Loricariidae, the suckermouth armored catfishes, and the subfamily Hypostominae, the suckermouth catfishes. The catfishes on this genus are found in South America. Many of these fish are popular aquarium fish.

== Taxonomy ==
Peckoltia was first proposed as a genus in 1917 by the Brazilian zoologist Alípio de Miranda Ribeiro, in 1945 William Alonzo Gosline designated Chaetostomus vittatus as the type species of the genus. C, vittatus was first formally described in 1881 by Franz Steindachner with its type locality given as the "Amazon River, Tajapouru, Xingu near Moz Port, Rio Madeira, Brazil". Some authorities regard this genus as being within the tribe Ancistrini of the subfamily Hypostominae, but Eschmeyer's Catalog of Fishes does not recognise tribes within the subfamily Hypostominae.

Peckoltia is sometimes considered to be a basal genus within the tribe Ancistrini of the subfamily Hypostominae. This genus is paraphyletic. However, other studies resolve this taxon as incertae sedis within Hypostominae. At this point, many undescribed species remain. Many of the possibly undescribed species have an identification through the L-number system.

Peckoltia species can be distinguished from most other in the genera in the tribe Ancistrini by having a lateral ridge on the opercle that usually has no odontodes and the teeth on their upper jaw (dentary) forming an angle under 90 degrees; while some genera also have an angled dentary, Peckoltia species lack synapomorphies of these genera. This genus and the closely related Hemiancistrus may be synonymous, as neither genus is supported by synapomorphies. Generally, Peckoltia are considered to be those that have dorsal saddles and bands in the fins, while Heminancistrus have spots and uniform coloration. This genus is also similar to Hypancistrus and Panaque except for differences in teeth. Teeth on both jaws are the same size as opposed to different sizes, which is different from Hypancistrus where the upper jaw teeth are larger. Also, the teeth are villiform (brush-shaped) rather than spoon-shaped, in contrast to the Panaque.

The classification of some of the species in this genus has been confused. P. yaravi has been moved to Neblinichthys. P. sabaji was arbitrarily placed in this genus (as opposed to Hemiancistrus), but may even represent its own genus; later, it has been placed in Hemiancistrus but (Armbruster et al. 2015) placed the species in the genus Peckoltia. Peckoltia bachi is placed in the genus Peckoltichthys and Peckoltia snethlageae and Peckoltia feldbergae are placed in the genus Ancistomus.

== Etymology ==
Peckoltia honors the Brazilian-born German botanist and pharmacist Gustavo Peckolt who published a book on Brazilian plants with his father and was a member of the Natural History Commission of Rondônia.

== Species ==
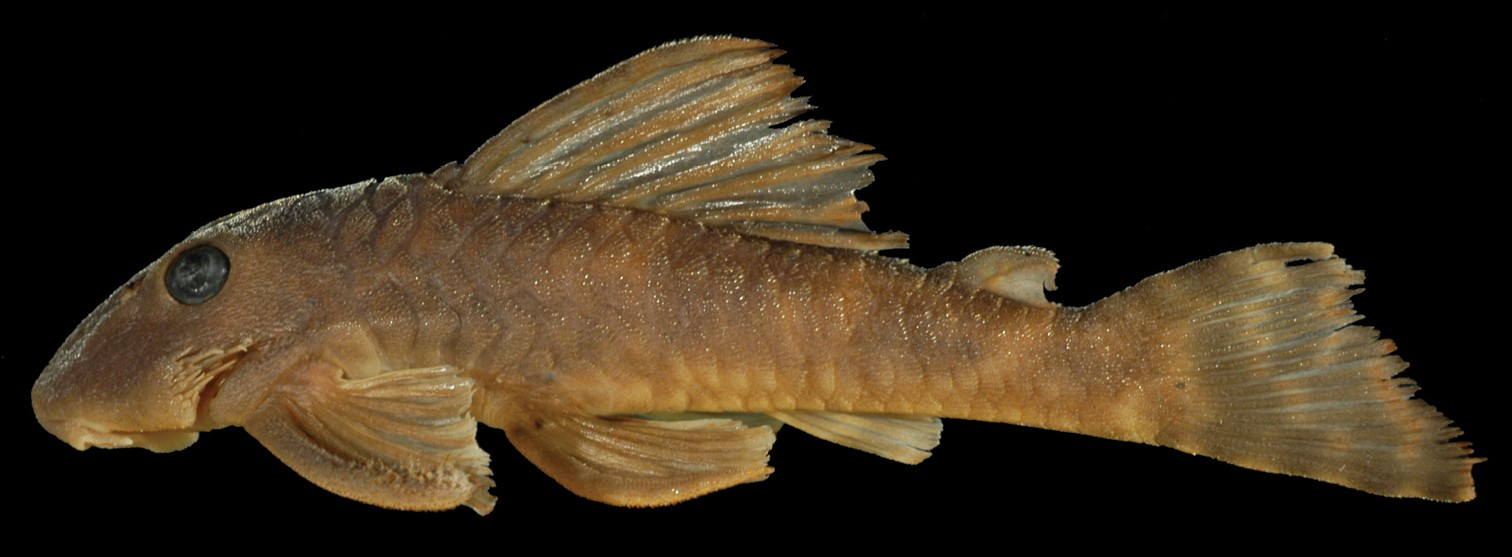
Peckoltia ephippiata

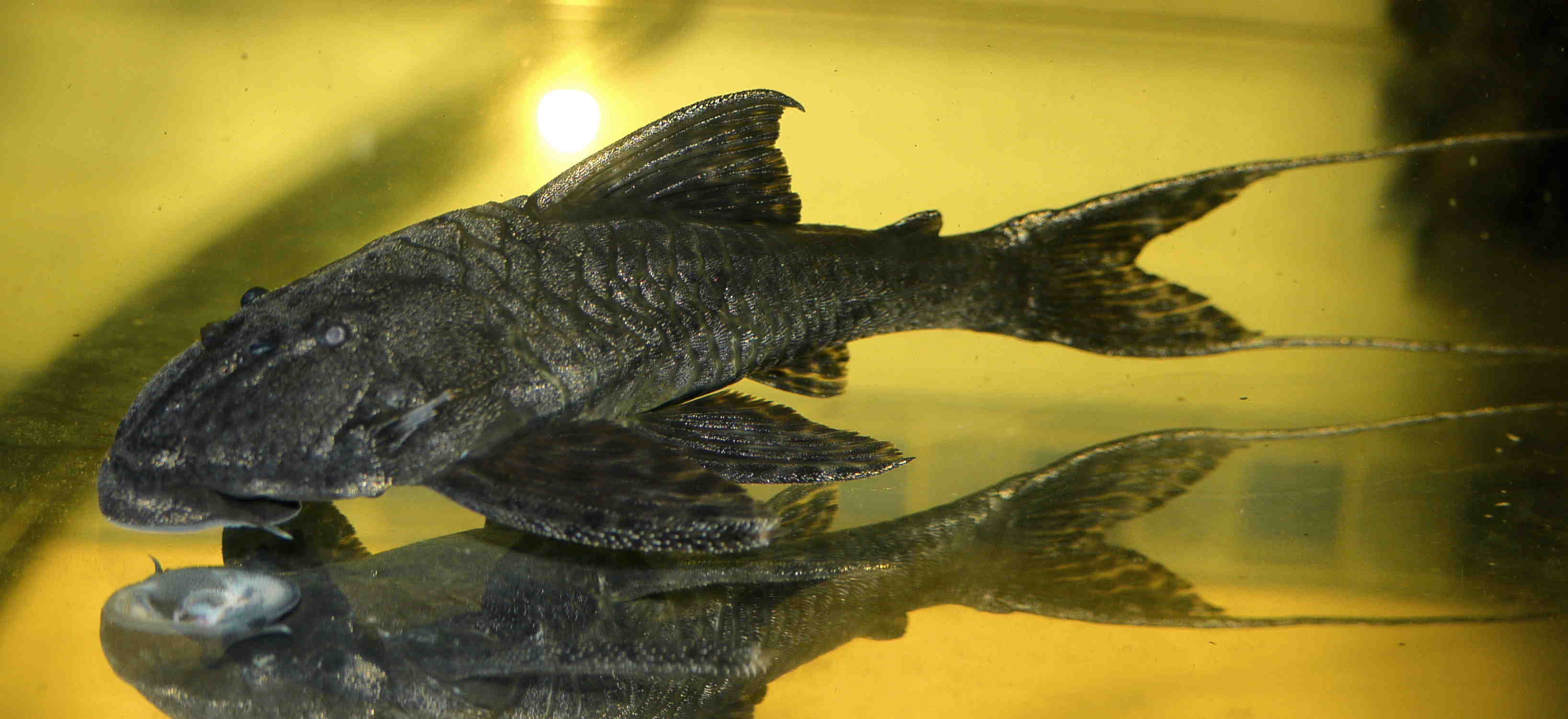
Peckoltia pankimpuju

Peckoltia contains the following valid species:

- Peckoltia amjikin de Araújo, Ferreira, Silva & Wosiacki, 2025
- Peckoltia braueri (C. H. Eigenmann, 1912) (Worm-line peckoltia)
- Peckoltia brevis (La Monte, 1935)
- Peckoltia caenosa Armbruster, 2008
- Peckoltia capitulata Fisch-Muller & Covain, 2012
- Peckoltia cavatica Armbruster & Werneke, 2005
- Peckoltia compta R. R. de Oliveira, Zuanon, Rapp Py-Daniel & M. S. Rocha, 2010
- Peckoltia ephippiata Armbruster, Werneke & M. Tan, 2015
- Peckoltia furcata (Fowler, 1940)
- Peckoltia greedoi Armbruster, Werneke & M. Tan, 2015
- Peckoltia lineola Armbruster, 2008
- Peckoltia lujani Armbruster, Werneke & M. Tan, 2015
- Peckoltia multispinis (Holly, 1929) (Bristle-mouth catfish)
- Peckoltia oligospila (Günther, 1864)
- Peckoltia otali Fisch-Muller & Covain, 2012
- Peckoltia pankimpuju (Lujan & Chamon, 2008)
- Peckoltia relictum (Lujan, Armbruster & Rengifo, 2011)
- Peckoltia sabaji Armbruster, 2003
- Peckoltia simulata Fisch-Muller & Covain, 2012
- Peckoltia vermiculata (Steindachner, 1908)
- Peckoltia vittata (Steindachner, 1881)
- Peckoltia wernekei Armbruster & Lujan, 2016

== Distribution and habitat ==
Peckoltia inhabit freshwater habitats in the Amazon basin, upper Orinoco, upper Essequibo River, and also possibly the Maroni River, as well as coastal drainages north of the Amazon to French Guiana. Three species, P. braueri, P. cavatica and P. sabaji are found in the Guiana Shield.

Peckoltia live in shallow, rocky riffles and in quieter water where they hide inside cavities in submerged logs.

== Appearance and anatomy ==
Peckoltia are members of the family Loricariidae, the armored suckermouth catfishes. As such, they have armor plating on their body instead of scales. Also, they have a suckermouth which they use to cling to rocks in their habitat. They have the characteristic Loricariid omega iris as well. Like many other catfish, Peckoltia have strong pectoral and dorsal fin spines that can be locked outwards as a defense.

Peckoltia have unmodified teeth and the teeth on their upper jaw form an angle under 90 degrees. Most male Peckoltia have hypertrophied odontodes on their body during the breeding season.

The biggest difference between all the Peckoltia species is coloration. They usually have a saddle-shaped marking on their back. However, P. caenosa are mottled.

Four species, P. braueri, P. caenosa, P. cavatica and P. vittata, lack spots on their head while the rest have them. P. braueri and P. cavatica have orange bands in the dorsal and caudal fins and have the bones and plates of the head and nape outlined in black; in P. caenosa and P. vittata, there are no orange bands and head plates and bones are not outlined. P. caenosa has dark vermiculations on the head and abdomen. P. vittata has saddles or blotches on the head and faint dark spots on the abdomen. P. lineola and P. vermiculata have spots on their head that combine to form vermiculations. In P. lineola the spots form vermiculations that are wider than its pupils, while in P. vermiculata the spots form vermiculations narrower than its pupils; also, the vermiculations radiate from a central point on the head in P. vermiculata, while there is no such pattern in P. lineola.

== In the aquarium ==
True Peckoltia species are fairly rarely exported for the pet trade; species called Peckoltia may actually be Panaque or Hypancistrus species. Peckoltia species are popular aquarium fish as they are small and attractive. They are shy and will spend much of the day hiding.

In 2013, aquarists reported breeding P. braueri in captivity for the first time.
