= Peckoltia oligospila =

Conservation status
- Least Concern (IUCN 3.1)

Scientific classification
- Kingdom: Animalia
- Phylum: Chordata
- Class: Actinopterygii
- Division: Teleostei
- Order: Siluriformes
- Family: Loricariidae
- Genus: Peckoltia
- Species: P. oligospila

Binomial name
- Peckoltia oligospila (Günther, 1864)

Synonyms
- Chaetostomus oligospilus Günther, 1864

Species of catfish

Peckoltia oligospila is a species of freshwater ray-finned fish belonging to the family Loricariidae, the suckermouth armoured catfishes, and the subfamily Hypostominae, the suckermouth catfishes. This fish is found in South America, where it is endemic to Brazil, occurring the Brazilian states of Pará and Tocantins,having been recorded from the basins of the Tocantins, Capim and Guamá rivers, in the eastern part of the Brazilian Amazon. This species reaches a standard length of 10.5 cm (4.1 in). It appears in the aquarium trade, where it is typically referred to either by its associated L-number, which is L-006, or as the brown-dot peckoltia.
