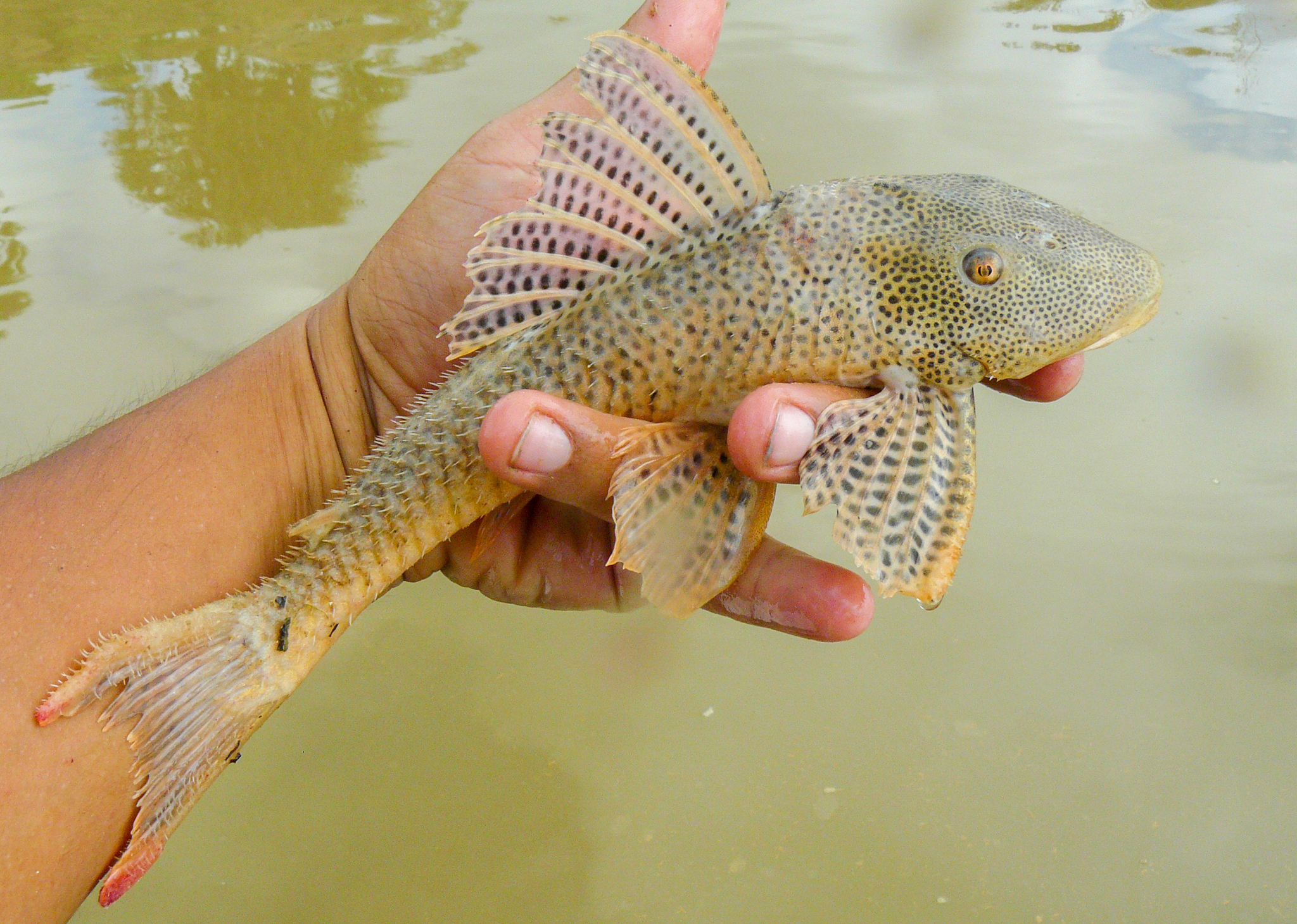

Conservation status
- Least Concern (IUCN 3.1)

Scientific classification
- Kingdom: Animalia
- Phylum: Chordata
- Class: Actinopterygii
- Division: Teleostei
- Order: Siluriformes
- Family: Loricariidae
- Genus: Aphanotorulus
- Species: A. unicolor

Binomial name
- Aphanotorulus unicolor (Steindachner, 1908)

Synonyms
- Plecostomus unicolor Steindachner, 1908; Hypostomus unicolor (Steindachner, 1908); Plecostomus madeirae Fowler, 1913; Hypostomus madeirae (Fowler, 1913); Plecostomus popoi Pearson, 1924; Hypostomus popoi (Pearson, 1924); Plecostomus micropunctatus LaMonte, 1935; Hypostomus micropunctatus (LaMonte, 1935); Plecostomus chaparae Fowler, 1940; Hypostomus chaparae (Fowler, 1940); Aphanotorulus frankei Isbrücker & Nijssen, 1983

= Aphanotorulus unicolor =

Species of catfish

Aphanotorulus unicolor is a species of freshwater ray-finned fish belonging to the family Loricariidae, the suckermouth armored catfishes, and the subfamily Hypostominae, the suckermouth catfishes. This catfish is found in South America.

== Taxonomy ==
Aphanotorulus unicolor was first formally described as Plecostomus unicolor in 1908 by the Austrian ichthyologist Franz Steindachner with its type locality given as the Purus River in Brazil. In 1983 Isaäc J. H. Isbrücker and Han Nijssen described a new species, Aphanotorulus frankei which they placed in a new monospecific genus, Aphanotorulus. In 2005 Jonathan W. Armbruster put Aphanotorulus in the synonymy of Hypostomus, although this was not accepted by all authorities, and classified A. frankei as a synonym of Hypostomus unicolor. In 2016, C. Keith Ray and Armbruster ressurected the genus, separating it and Isorineloricaria out from Hypostomus, confirming A. frankei as its type species. The genus Aphanotorulus is sometimes classfied in the tribe Hypostomini, but Eschmeyer's Catalog of Fishes does not recognise tribes within the subfamily Hypostominae.

== Etymology ==
Aphanotorulus unicolor is the type species of the genus Aphanotorulus, a name which combines aphanḗs, Greek for "overlooked", with the Latin word torulus which means "a small expansion", a references to the many small papillae in the mouth of this species. The specific name, unicolor, refers to the uniform color, probably of a preserved specimen as living fish are spotted.

== Description ==
Aphanotorulus unicolor reaches a standard length of 13.9 cm (5.5 in).

== Distribution and habitat ==
Aphanotorulus unicolor is found in the Amazon basin of South America in Bolivia, Brazil, Colombia, Ecuador and Peru, a record from the Orinoco in Venezuela is uncertain. This species is found in rivers.
