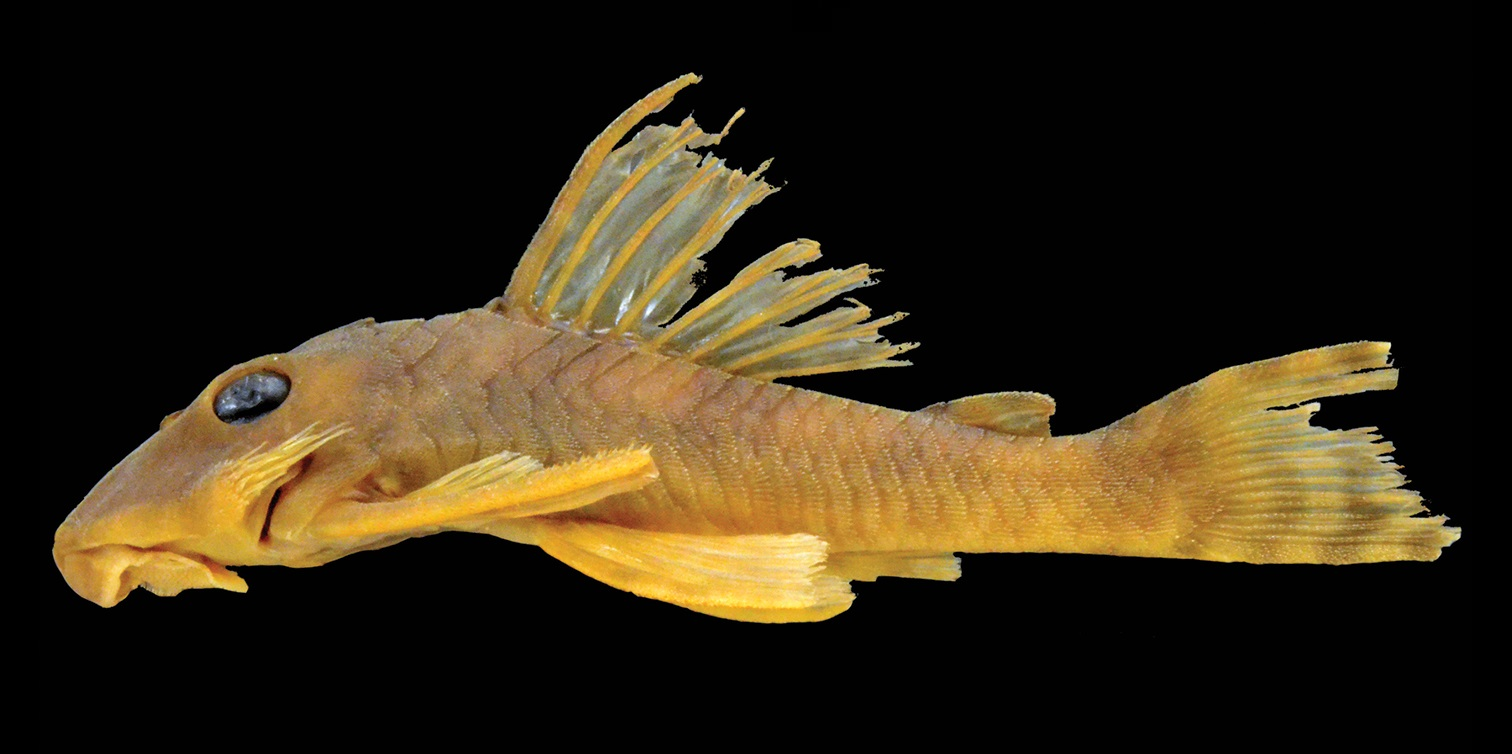

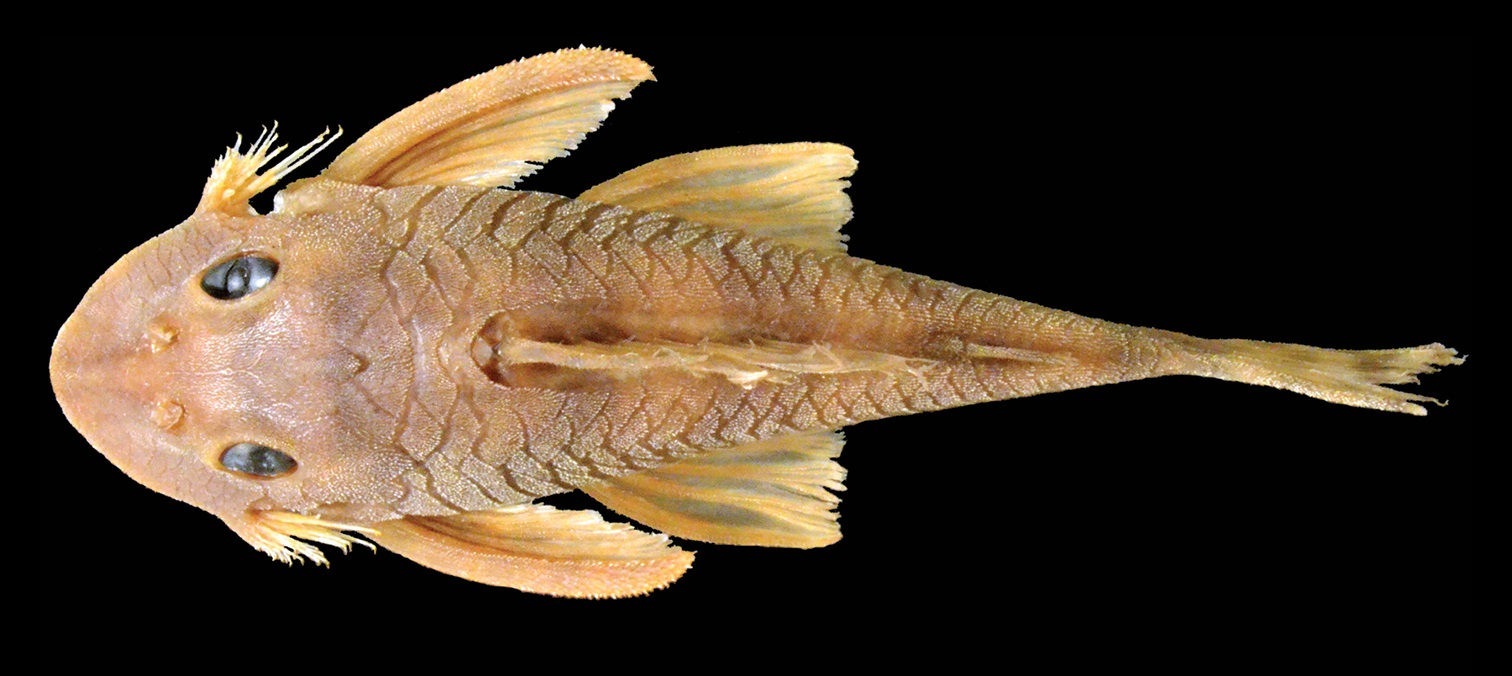
- Two views of the holotype specimen

Scientific classification
- Kingdom: Animalia
- Phylum: Chordata
- Class: Actinopterygii
- Division: Teleostei
- Order: Siluriformes
- Family: Loricariidae
- Subfamily: Hypostominae
- Genus: Peckoltia
- Species: P. greedoi

Binomial name
- Peckoltia greedoi Armbruster, Werneke & M. Tan, 2015

= Peckoltia greedoi =

Species of fish

Peckoltia greedoi is a species of freshwater ray-finned fish belonging to the family Loricariidae, the suckermouth armoured catfishes, and the subfamily Hypostominae, the suckermouth catfishes. This species is found in the Gurupí River drainage of Brazil. Reddish brown in color with three saddle shaped patches on the dorsal surface and three to four dark bands on the tail fin, individuals can measure from 45 to 78 mm (1.8 to 3.1 in) in standard length.

== Etymology ==
The species was described in 2015 by a team of researchers from Auburn University in Alabama. The researchers named it after the character Greedo from George Lucas' Star Wars franchise, stating that the species and the character shared a "remarkable resemblance".
