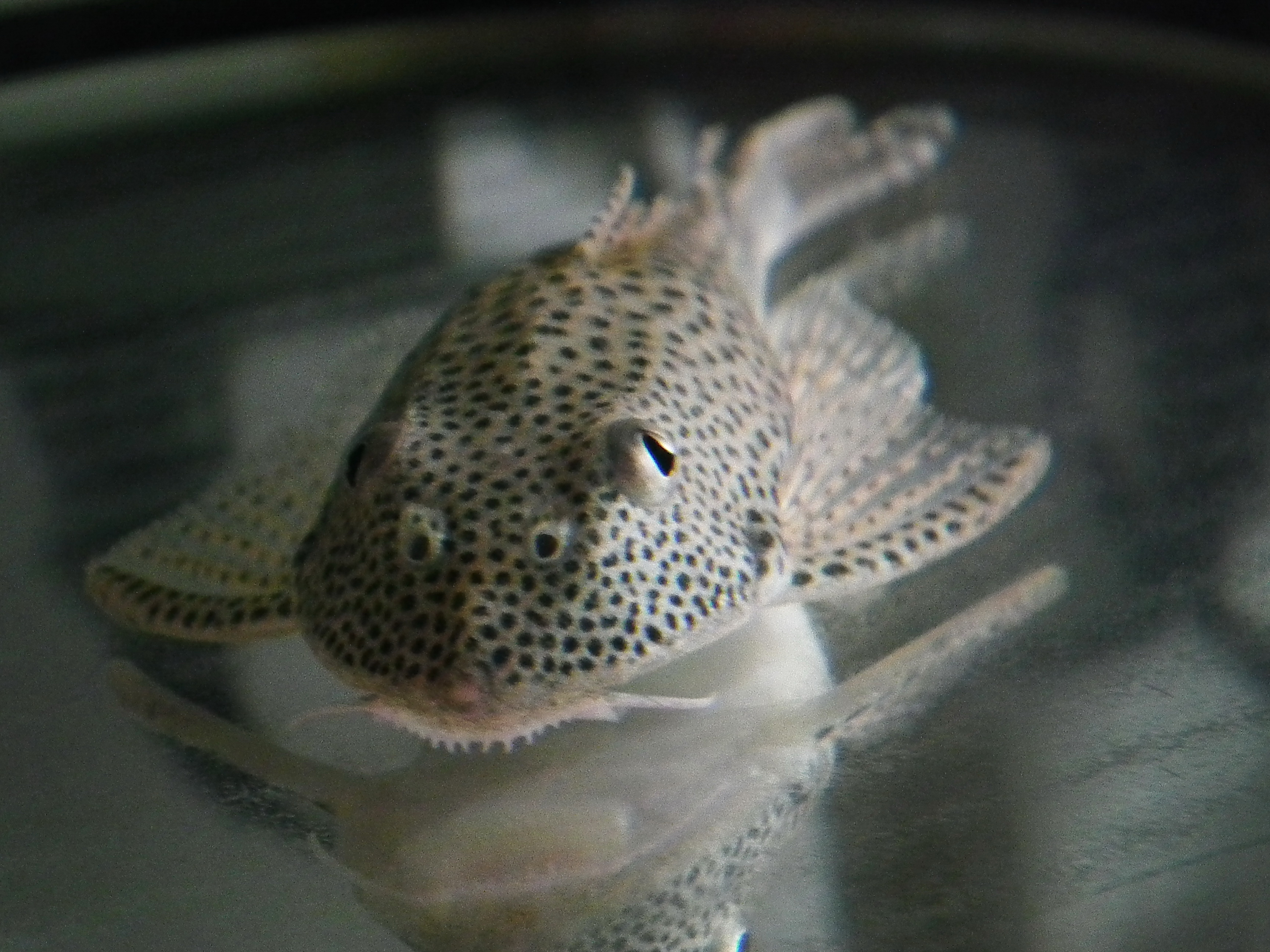
- Aphanotorulus sp.

Scientific classification
- Kingdom: Animalia
- Phylum: Chordata
- Class: Actinopterygii
- Division: Teleostei
- Order: Siluriformes
- Family: Loricariidae
- Subfamily: Hypostominae
- Genus: Aphanotorulus; Isbrücker & Nijssen, 1983

Type species
- Aphanotorulus frankei Isbrücker & Nijssen, 1983

Synonyms
- Squaliforma Isbrücker & Michels, 2001

= Aphanotorulus =

Genus of fishes

Aphanotorulus is a genus of freshwater ray-finned fishes belonging to the family Loricariidae, the suckermouth armored catfishes, and the subfamily Hypostominae, the suckermouth catfishes. The catfishes in this genus are found in the Amazon, Orinoco, Essequibo and Jaguaribe basins in South America. They typically occur on a sand or gravel bottom in slow to moderately flowing rivers and streams, but some species occur in areas with fast current. The largest species in the genus reaches up to 51 cm (20 in) in standard length.

== Taxonomy ==
The taxonomy of this genus has been a matter of dispute, all having been placed in Hypostomus in the past, and some occasionally placed in Squaliforma. Squaliforma is now regarded as a synonym of Aphanotorulus, but species west of the Andes have been moved to Isorineloricaria.

There are currently 7 recognized species of Aphanotorulus:

- Aphanotorulus ammophilus Armbruster & Page, 1996
- Aphanotorulus emarginatus (Valenciennes, 1840)
- Aphanotorulus gomesi (Fowler, 1941)
- Aphanotorulus horridus (Kner, 1854)
- Aphanotorulus phrixosoma (Fowler, 1940)
- Aphanotorulus rubrocauda A. S. Oliveira, Py-Daniel & Zawadzki, 2017
- Aphanotorulus unicolor (Steindachner, 1908)

Of these species, the validity of A. phrixosoma is questionable, as the only known specimen likely is a hybrid between A. horridus and A. unicolor.
