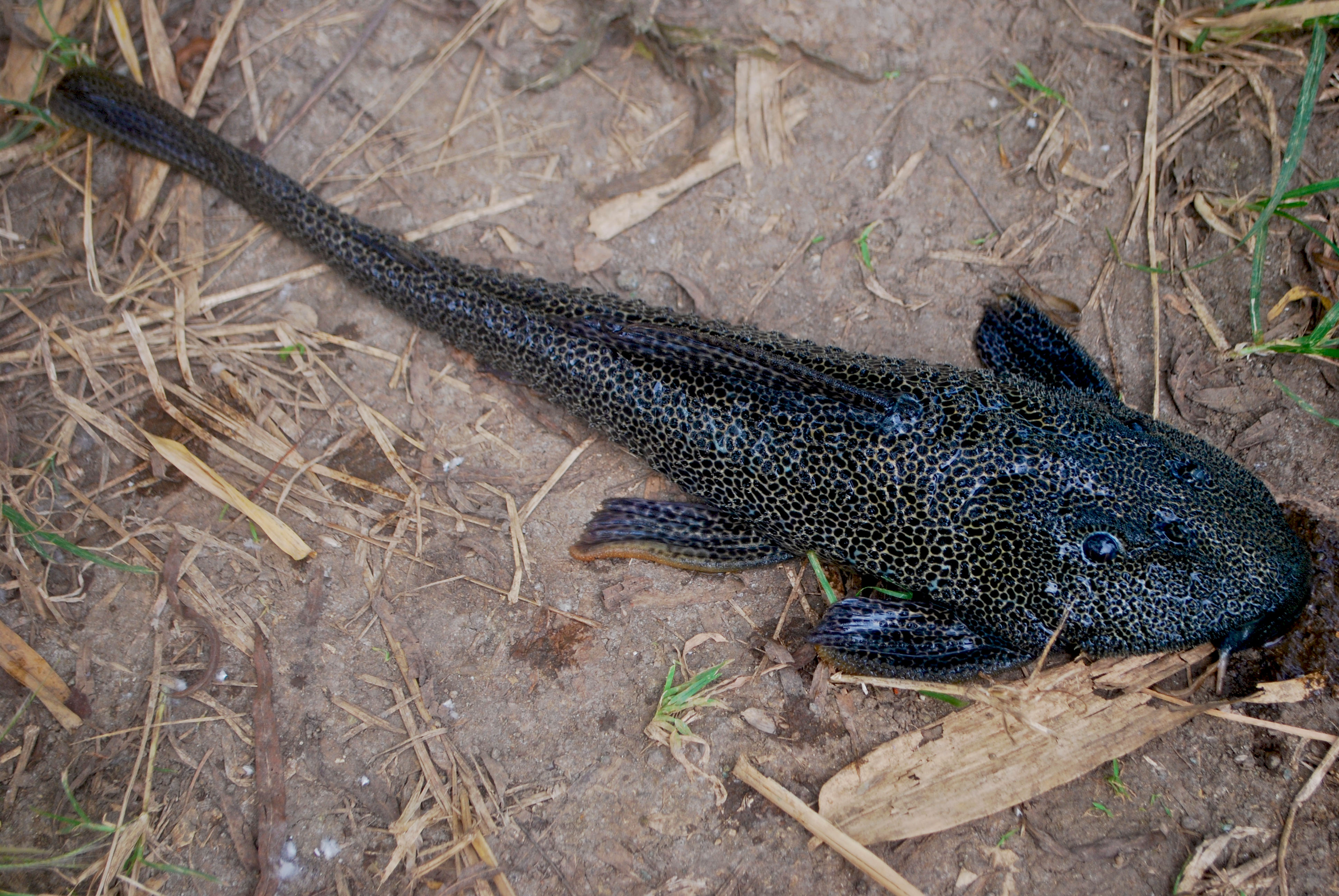
- Isorineloricaria spinosissima

Scientific classification
- Kingdom: Animalia
- Phylum: Chordata
- Class: Actinopterygii
- Order: Siluriformes
- Family: Loricariidae
- Tribe: Hypostomini
- Genus: Isorineloricaria; Isbrücker, 1980

= Isorineloricaria =

Genus of fishes

Isorineloricaria is a genus of catfish in the family Loricariidae from northwestern South America. They live in rivers and streams, typically with slow to moderately running water, in the Orinoco, Maracaibo, Magdalena and Guayas basins (one species in each basin). The largest species in the genus reaches up to 52 cm (20 in) in standard length.

== Taxonomy ==
The taxonomy of this genus has been a matter of dispute, all having been placed in Hypostomus in the past, and some occasionally placed in Squaliforma. Squaliforma is now regarded as a synonym of Aphanotorulus, but species west of the Andes have been moved to Isorineloricaria.

There are currently 4 recognized species in this genus:

- Isorineloricaria acuarius C. K. Ray & Armbruster, 2016
- Isorineloricaria spinosissima (Steindachner, 1880) (Zucchini catfish)
- Isorineloricaria tenuicauda (Steindachner, 1878)
- Isorineloricaria villarsi (Lütken, 1874)
