= D. picta =

D. picta can refer to a number of different species. The specific epithet picta means 'painted.'

- Dacne picta, a beetle in the family Erotylidae
- Dalbergaria picta, a plant in the family Gesneriaceae
- Dalmannia picta, a fly in the family Conopidae
- Damoisiella picta, a weevil in the family Brentidae
- Danthonia picta, a plant in the family Poaceae
- Deguelia picta, a plant in the family Fabaceae
- Deinacris picta, a grasshopper in the family Acrididae
- Dejerosa picta, a spider in the family Lycosidae found in Mozambique
- Dekeyseria picta, an armored catfish in the family Loricariidae endemic to Brazil
- Delphinia picta, a picture-winged fly in the family Ulidiidae
- Depazea picta, a fungus in the family Gnomoniaceae
- Desmiphora picta, a beetle in the family Cerambycidae
- Desserobdella picta, a worm in the family Glossiphoniidae
- Diapetimorpha picta, a ichneumonid wasp in the family Ichneumonidae
- Diatassa picta, a weevil in the family Curculionidae
- Dichaea picta, a plant in the family Orchidaceae
- Dichorisandra picta, a plant plant the family Commelinaceae
- Dicoma picta, a plant in the family Asteraceae
- Dicranophora picta, a fly in the family Stratiomyidae
- Dictyophara picta, a planthopper in the family Dictyopharidae
- Didactylia picta, a beetle in the family Aphodiidae
- Didymocantha picta, a beetle in the family Cerambycidae
- Dieffenbachia picta, synonym for Dieffenbachia seguine, a plant in the family Araceae
- Diegoa picta, a beetle in the family Mycteridae
- Diffalaba picta, a sea snail in the family Litiopidae
- Dimelaena picta, a lichen in the family Caliciaceae
- Diplobatis picta, synonym for Diplobatis pictus, an electric ray in the family Narcinidae
- Diplurodes picta, a moth in the family Geometridae
- Dipoena picta, a spider in the family Theridiidae
- Dirinaria picta, a lichen in the family Caliciaceae
- Dirona picta, a sea slug in the family Dironidae
- Disa picta, a plant in the family Orchidaceae
- Discestra picta, a moth in the family Noctuidae
- Dischidia picta, a plant in the family Apocynaceae
- Disphaerona picta, a weevil in the family Anthribidae
- Diuris picta, a plant in the family Orchidaceae
- Doddosia picta, a fly in the family Bombyliidae
- Doleschalla picta, a fly in the family Tachinidae
- Dolichoctis picta, a beetle in the family Carabidae
- Dolichogyna picta, a hoverfly in the family Syrphidae
- Dolichoplana picta, a worm in the family Geoplanidae
- Donacilla picta, a bivalve in the family Mesodesmatidae
- Dorisca picta, a bivalve in the family Veneridae
- Dorstenia picta, a plant in the family Moraceae
- Draconarius picta, a spider in the family Amaurobiidae
- Drasteria picta, a moth in the family Erebidae
- Drosophila picta, a fly in the family Drosophilidae
- Drymoda picta, a synonym for Bulbophyllum drymoda, a plant in the family Orchidaceae
- Dryudella picta, a wasp in the family Crabronidae
- Duomyia picta, a fly in the family Platystomatidae
- Dysschema picta, synonym for Dysschema pictum, a Brazilian moth in the family Erebidae
