= D. compacta =

D. compacta may refer to:

- Dalea compacta (compact praireclover), a plant of the American South
- Dasymallomyia compacta, a crane fly in the genus Dasymallomyia
- Desmiphora compacta, a beetle of Brazil and Paraguay
- Digitaria compacta, a grass of India and Indochina
- Dispar compacta (dispar skipper or barred skipper), a butterfly of Australia
- Dudleya compacta (bluff lettuce, powdery liveforever or powdery dudleya), a succulent plant of North America
