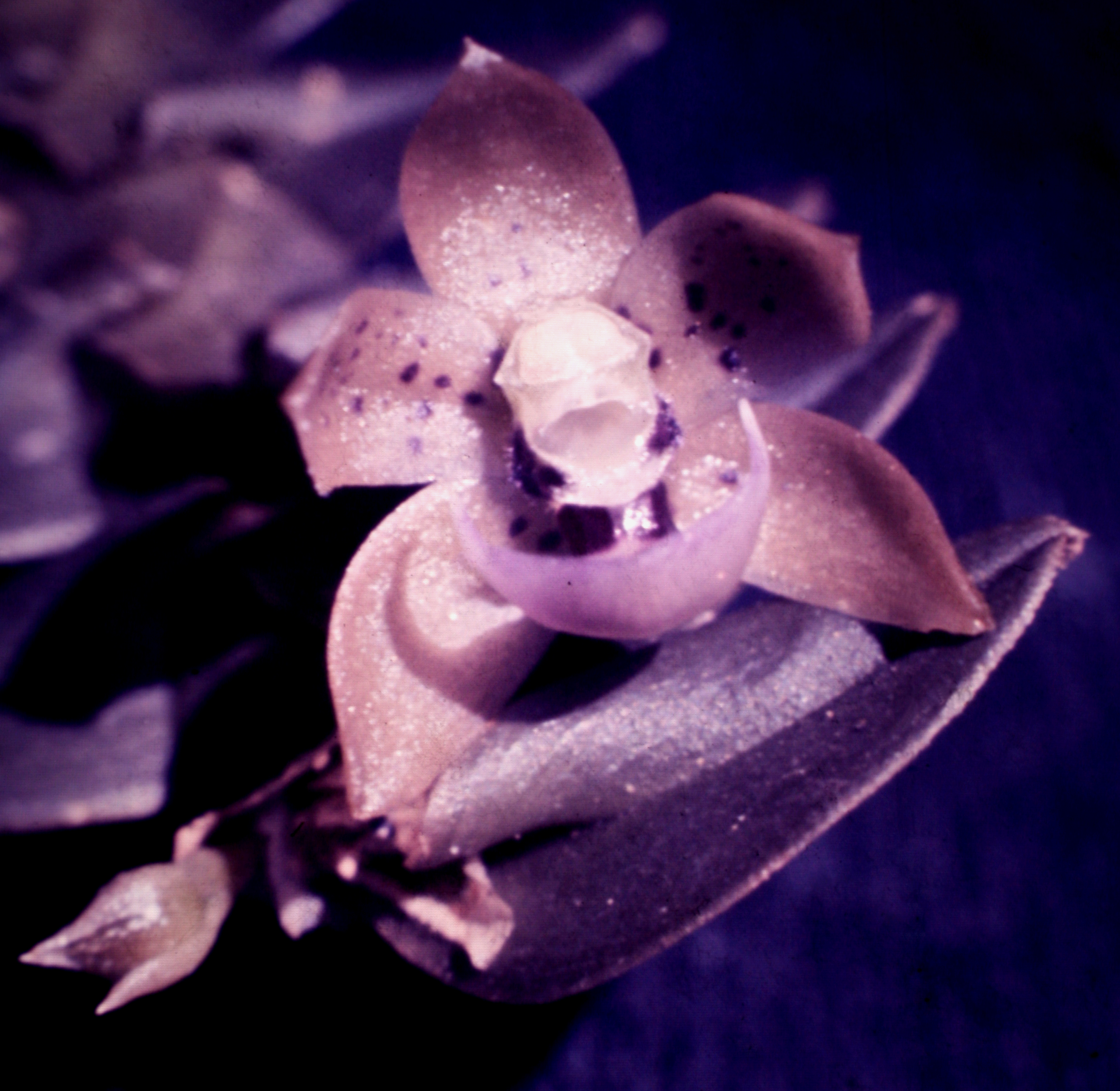

Scientific classification
- Kingdom: Plantae
- Clade: Tracheophytes
- Clade: Angiosperms
- Clade: Monocots
- Order: Asparagales
- Family: Orchidaceae
- Subfamily: Epidendroideae
- Genus: Dichaea
- Species: D. muricata

Binomial name
- Dichaea muricata (Sw.) Lindl.

Synonyms
- Cymbidium muricatum Sw. 1799; Epidendrum muricatum (Sw.) Poir.; Dichaea moritzii Rchb.f.; Dichaea morrisii Fawc. & Rendle 1910; Dichaea muricata var. moritzii (Rchb.f.) Cogn.; Dichaea bradeorum Schltr.; Dichaea ovatipetala Schltr.; Dichaea similis Schltr.; Dichaea verrucosa Ames & C.Schweinf.; Dichaea robusta Schltr.

= Dichaea muricata =

Species of orchid

Dichaea muricata is a species of orchid.

== Description ==
It is a small orchid that grows in warm, wet environments. It is similar to a hanging reed with several leaves, strictly ovate, and it blooms with fragrant flowers 1–2 cm in length that appear at the end of the axils of the leaves. Flowering occurs in winter.

== Distribution ==
It is found on Hispaniola, Jamaica, Trinidad and Tobago, Venezuela, Colombia, Peru, and Brazil.
