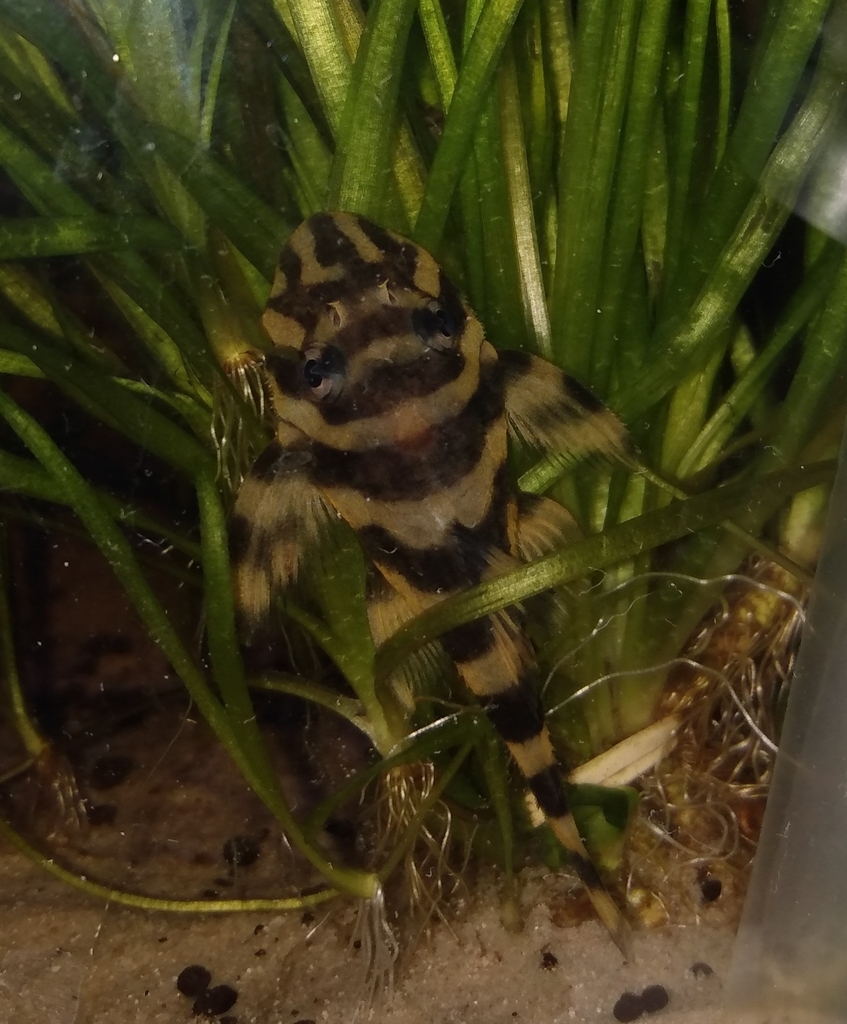
- Dekeyseria picta

Scientific classification
- Kingdom: Animalia
- Phylum: Chordata
- Class: Actinopterygii
- Order: Siluriformes
- Family: Loricariidae
- Subfamily: Hypostominae
- Genus: Dekeyseria; Rapp Py-Daniel, 1985

Type species
- Dekeyseria amazonica Rapp Py-Daniel, 1985

Species
- see text

Synonyms
- Zonancistrus Isbrücker, 2001

= Dekeyseria =

Genus of fishes

Dekeyseria is a genus of freshwater ray-finned fish belonging to the family Loricariidae, the suckermouth armoured catfishes, and the subfamily Hypostominae, the suckermouth catfishes. These catfishes are found in the Amazon and Orinoco river systems in South America

== Species ==
Dekeyseria contains the following valid species:

- Dekeyseria amazonica Rapp Py-Daniel, 1985
- Dekeyseria niveata (LaMonte, 1929)
- Dekeyseria picta (Kner, 1854)
- Dekeyseria scaphirhynchus (Kner, 1854)

== Taxonomy ==
Dekeyseria was first described with D. amazonica as type species in 1985 by Lúcia Helena Rapp Py-Daniel. Later, Zonancistrus was described for D. brachyura, D. picta, and D. pulchra. However, this distinction was based on colouration, which is not a useful characteristic in diagnosing genera in loricariids; other genera such as Hypancistrus and Pseudolithoxus also exhibit a range of colouration patterns. Though Dekeyseria is not diagnosed by any unique characteristic, it is still a well-diagnosed genus.

=== Etymology ===
Dekeyserai honours the French zoologist Pierre Louis Dekeyser of the Federal University of Paraíba.

== Distribution ==
Dekeyseria species are known from the Rio Negro, floodplain lakes of the Amazon, and upper Orinoco.

== Description ==
Dekeyseria is an unusual group of fishes that appear similar to Lasiancistrus. Colour pattern is variable with some species brown with some mottling in the fins, and others with a bold pattern of brown bars on a tan background. In brown species, the abdomen is slightly lighter than the sides. In barred species, the head has large tan spots, the spots becoming larger posteriorly until the bars form as separate entities. There are about eight bars in these barred species. However, Dekeyseria species are also able to change their colours quickly, like a chameleon, to fit their mood or their surroundings.

The species are flattened more than typical Ancistrini, and the lateral plates have median rows of long, sharp odontodes forming keels. Odontodes form well-developed rows above and below the keel rows in all individuals. Tentacles are associated with odontodes on the pectoral fin spine and snout, but are shorter than the supporting odontodes (rather than longer, as in Ancistrus). These fish range in size from 10.0–21 centimetres (3.9–8.3 inches) SL.

Breeding males develop elongated odontodes along the snout margin anterior to the evertible cheek odontodes and on the pectoral fin rays. In some species, the cheek odontodes are extremely long. The brown species appear to have a greater development of the snout odontodes and the barred species a greater development of the pectoral fin spine odontodes.

== Ecology ==
Dekeyseria has been reported as an air-breather.
