= Dekeyseria niveata =

Scientific classification
- Kingdom: Animalia
- Phylum: Chordata
- Class: Actinopterygii
- Order: Siluriformes
- Family: Loricariidae
- Genus: Dekeyseria
- Species: D. niveata

Binomial name
- Dekeyseria niveata (La Monte, 1929)

Synonyms
- Plecostomus niveatus La Monte, 1929; Peckoltia niveata (La Monte, 1929)

Species of fish

Dekeyseria niveata is a species of freshwater ray-finned fish belonging to the family Loricariidae, the suckermouth armoured catfishes, and the subfamily Hypostominae, the suckermouth catfishes. This catfish is endemic to Venezuela where it is found in the upper Orinoco River basin. This species grows to a standard length of 13 cm (5.1 in).
