= Dekeyseria amazonica =

Conservation status
- Least Concern (IUCN 3.1)

Scientific classification
- Kingdom: Animalia
- Phylum: Chordata
- Class: Actinopterygii
- Order: Siluriformes
- Family: Loricariidae
- Genus: Dekeyseria
- Species: D. amazonica

Binomial name
- Dekeyseria amazonica Rapp Py-Daniel, 1985

Species of fish

Dekeyseria amazonica is a species of freshwater ray-finned fish belonging to the family Loricariidae, the suckermouth armoured catfishes, and the subfamily Hypostominae, the suckermouth catfishes. This catfish is found in the Amazon basin, including the main Amazon River in Brazil and Colombia. This species reaches a standard length of 17.8 cm (7.0 in) and a weight of 89.69 g (3.164 oz).
