= Desmiphora compta =

Scientific classification
- Domain: Eukaryota
- Kingdom: Animalia
- Phylum: Arthropoda
- Class: Insecta
- Order: Coleoptera
- Suborder: Polyphaga
- Infraorder: Cucujiformia
- Family: Cerambycidae
- Genus: Desmiphora
- Species: D. compta

Binomial name
- Desmiphora compta Martins & Galileo, 2005

Species of beetle

Desmiphora compta is a species of beetle in the family Cerambycidae. It was described by Martins and Galileo in 2005. It is known from Bolivia.
