= Desmiphora niveocincta =

Scientific classification
- Domain: Eukaryota
- Kingdom: Animalia
- Phylum: Arthropoda
- Class: Insecta
- Order: Coleoptera
- Suborder: Polyphaga
- Infraorder: Cucujiformia
- Family: Cerambycidae
- Genus: Desmiphora
- Species: D. niveocincta

Binomial name
- Desmiphora niveocincta (Lane, 1959)

Species of beetle

Desmiphora niveocincta is a species of beetle in the family Cerambycidae. It was described by Lane in 1959. It is known from Panama.
