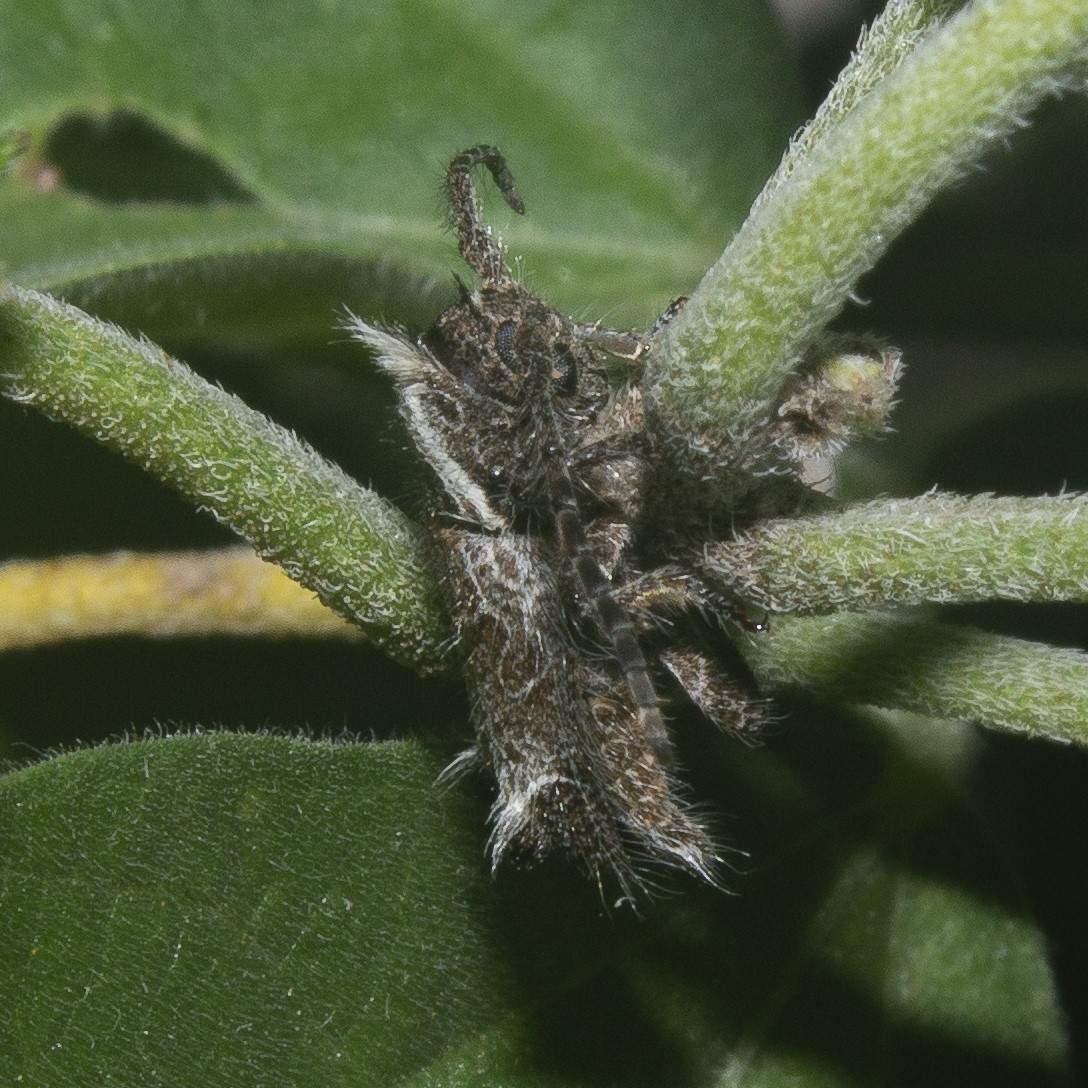

Scientific classification
- Kingdom: Animalia
- Phylum: Arthropoda
- Class: Insecta
- Order: Coleoptera
- Suborder: Polyphaga
- Infraorder: Cucujiformia
- Family: Cerambycidae
- Genus: Desmiphora
- Species: D. tristis

Binomial name
- Desmiphora tristis Galileo & Martins, 2003

= Desmiphora tristis =

Species of beetle

Desmiphora tristis is a species of beetle in the family Cerambycidae. It was first described by Galileo and Martins in 2003 and is known from Colombia.
