= Dekeyseria scaphirhynchus =

Conservation status
- Least Concern (IUCN 3.1)

Scientific classification
- Kingdom: Animalia
- Phylum: Chordata
- Class: Actinopterygii
- Order: Siluriformes
- Family: Loricariidae
- Genus: Dekeyseria
- Species: D. scaphirhynchus

Binomial name
- Dekeyseria scaphirhynchus (Kner, 1929)

Synonyms
- Ancistrus scaphirhynchus Kner, 1854; Peckoltia scaphirhynchus (Kner, 1854); Dekeyseria scaphirhyncha (Kner, 1854)

Species of fish

Dekeyseria scaphirhynchus is a species of freshwater ray-finned fish belonging to the family Loricariidae, the suckermouth armoured catfishes, and the subfamily Hypostominae, the suckermouth catfishes. This catfish has a wide geographic range in the Amazon and Orinoco basins of Brazil, Colombia and Venezuela. This species grows to a standard length of 21 cm (8.3 in).
