= Desmiphora mirim =

Scientific classification
- Domain: Eukaryota
- Kingdom: Animalia
- Phylum: Arthropoda
- Class: Insecta
- Order: Coleoptera
- Suborder: Polyphaga
- Infraorder: Cucujiformia
- Family: Cerambycidae
- Genus: Desmiphora
- Species: D. mirim

Binomial name
- Desmiphora mirim Martins & Galileo, 2002

Species of beetle

Desmiphora mirim is a species of beetle in the family Cerambycidae. It was described by Martins and Galileo in 2002. It is known from Brazil.
