= Desmiphora xerophila =

Scientific classification
- Kingdom: Animalia
- Phylum: Arthropoda
- Clade: Pancrustacea
- Class: Insecta
- Order: Coleoptera
- Suborder: Polyphaga
- Infraorder: Cucujiformia
- Family: Cerambycidae
- Genus: Desmiphora
- Species: D. xerophila

Binomial name
- Desmiphora xerophila Martins & Galileo, 1995

Species of beetle

Desmiphora xerophila is a species of longhorn beetle in the family Cerambycidae. It was described by Martins and Galileo in 1995. It is known from Ecuador.
