= Desmiphora x-signata =

Scientific classification
- Kingdom: Animalia
- Phylum: Arthropoda
- Class: Insecta
- Order: Coleoptera
- Suborder: Polyphaga
- Infraorder: Cucujiformia
- Family: Cerambycidae
- Genus: Desmiphora
- Species: D. x-signata

Binomial name
- Desmiphora x-signata Melzer, 1935

Synonyms
- Desmiphora x-signatus Melzer, 1935; Desmiphora (Desmiphora) x-signata Breuning, 1974

Species of beetle

Desmiphora x-signata is a species of beetle in the family Cerambycidae. It was described by Melzer in 1935.
