= Desmiphora multicristata =

Scientific classification
- Domain: Eukaryota
- Kingdom: Animalia
- Phylum: Arthropoda
- Class: Insecta
- Order: Coleoptera
- Suborder: Polyphaga
- Infraorder: Cucujiformia
- Family: Cerambycidae
- Genus: Desmiphora
- Species: D. multicristata

Binomial name
- Desmiphora multicristata Bates, 1866

Species of beetle

Desmiphora multicristata is a species of beetle in the family Cerambycidae. It was described by Henry Walter Bates in 1866. It is known from Brazil and French Guiana.
