= Desmiphora elegantula =

Scientific classification
- Domain: Eukaryota
- Kingdom: Animalia
- Phylum: Arthropoda
- Class: Insecta
- Order: Coleoptera
- Suborder: Polyphaga
- Infraorder: Cucujiformia
- Family: Cerambycidae
- Genus: Desmiphora
- Species: D. elegantula

Binomial name
- Desmiphora elegantula White, 1855

Species of beetle

Desmiphora elegantula is a species of beetle in the family Cerambycidae. It was described by Adam White in 1855. It is known from Brazil, Venezuela and French Guiana.
