= Desmiphora crinita =

Scientific classification
- Domain: Eukaryota
- Kingdom: Animalia
- Phylum: Arthropoda
- Class: Insecta
- Order: Coleoptera
- Suborder: Polyphaga
- Infraorder: Cucujiformia
- Family: Cerambycidae
- Genus: Desmiphora
- Species: D. crinita

Binomial name
- Desmiphora crinita Giesbert, 1998

Species of beetle

Desmiphora crinita is a species of beetle in the family Cerambycidae. It was described by Giesbert in 1998. It is known from Panama.
