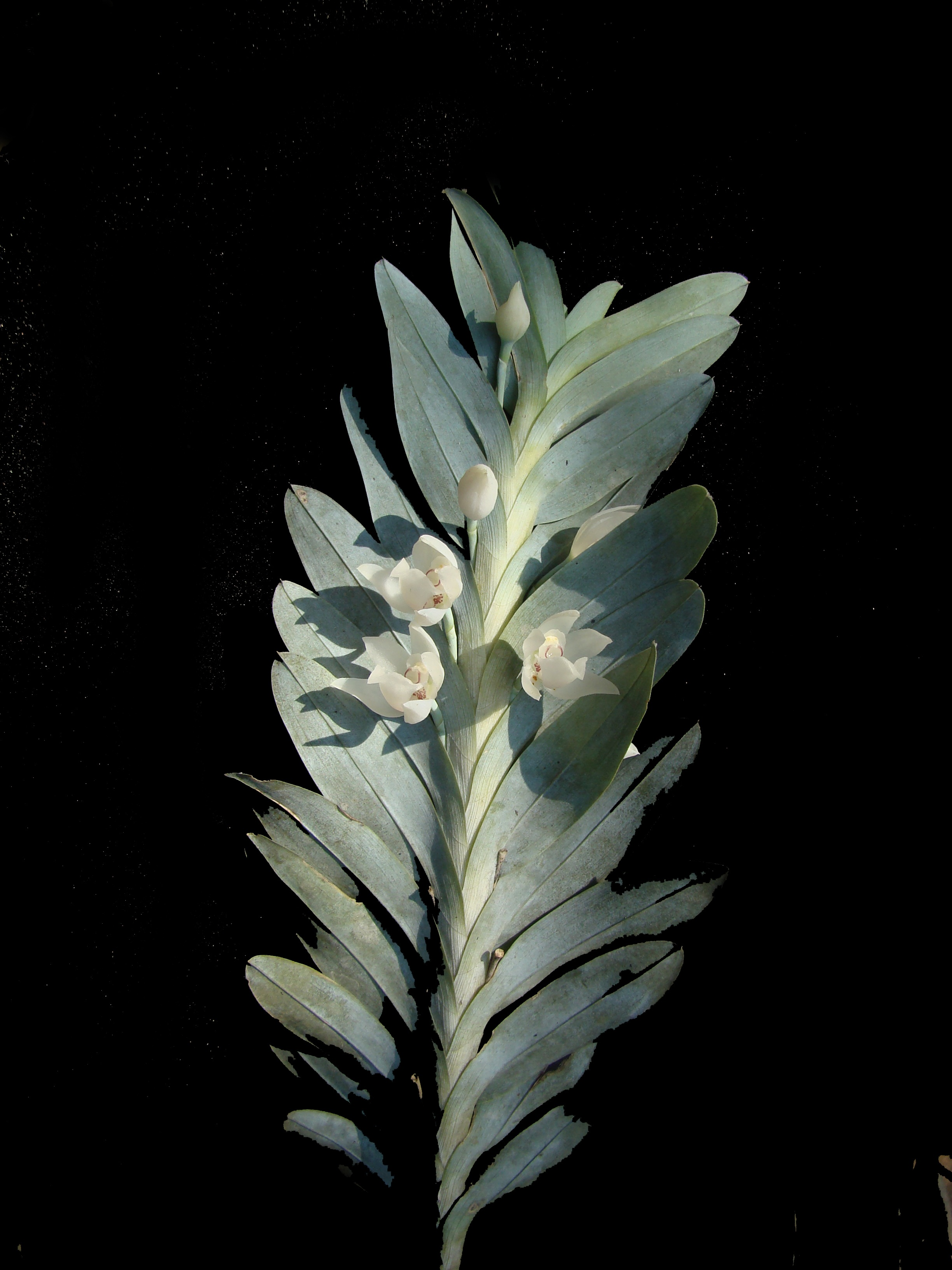

Scientific classification
- Kingdom: Plantae
- Clade: Tracheophytes
- Clade: Angiosperms
- Clade: Monocots
- Order: Asparagales
- Family: Orchidaceae
- Subfamily: Epidendroideae
- Genus: Dichaea
- Species: D. glauca

Binomial name
- Dichaea glauca (Sw.) Lindl.

Synonyms
- Epidendrum glaucum Sw. (Basionym); Cymbidium glaucum (Sw.) Sw.; Dichaeopsis glauca (Sw.) Schltr.; Dichaea willdenowiana Kraenzl.

= Dichaea glauca =

Species of orchid

Dichaea glauca is a species of orchid.
