= Desmiphora maculosa =

Scientific classification
- Domain: Eukaryota
- Kingdom: Animalia
- Phylum: Arthropoda
- Class: Insecta
- Order: Coleoptera
- Suborder: Polyphaga
- Infraorder: Cucujiformia
- Family: Cerambycidae
- Genus: Desmiphora
- Species: D. maculosa

Binomial name
- Desmiphora maculosa Linsley & Chemsak, 1966

Species of beetle

Desmiphora maculosa is a species of beetle in the family Cerambycidae. It was described by Linsley and Chemsak in 1966. It is known from the Galapagos Islands.
