= Desmiphora boliviana =

Scientific classification
- Kingdom: Animalia
- Phylum: Arthropoda
- Class: Insecta
- Order: Coleoptera
- Suborder: Polyphaga
- Infraorder: Cucujiformia
- Family: Cerambycidae
- Genus: Desmiphora
- Species: D. boliviana

Binomial name
- Desmiphora boliviana Breuning, 1948

Species of beetle

Desmiphora boliviana is a species of beetle in the family Cerambycidae. It was described by Stephan von Breuning in 1948. It is known from Bolivia (from which its species epithet is derived) and French Guiana.
