= Desmiphora auatinga =

Scientific classification
- Domain: Eukaryota
- Kingdom: Animalia
- Phylum: Arthropoda
- Class: Insecta
- Order: Coleoptera
- Suborder: Polyphaga
- Infraorder: Cucujiformia
- Family: Cerambycidae
- Genus: Desmiphora
- Species: D. auatinga

Binomial name
- Desmiphora auatinga Martins & Galileo, 1996

Species of beetle

Desmiphora auatinga is a species of beetle in the family Cerambycidae. It was described by Martins and Galileo in 1996. It is known from El Oro: Machala Ecuador.
