= Desmiphora jullienae =

Scientific classification
- Domain: Eukaryota
- Kingdom: Animalia
- Phylum: Arthropoda
- Class: Insecta
- Order: Coleoptera
- Suborder: Polyphaga
- Infraorder: Cucujiformia
- Family: Cerambycidae
- Genus: Desmiphora
- Species: D. jullienae

Binomial name
- Desmiphora jullienae Tavakilian & Néouze, 2004

Species of beetle

Desmiphora jullienae is a species of beetle in the family Cerambycidae. It was described by Tavakilian and Néouze in 2004. It is known to live in French Guiana.
