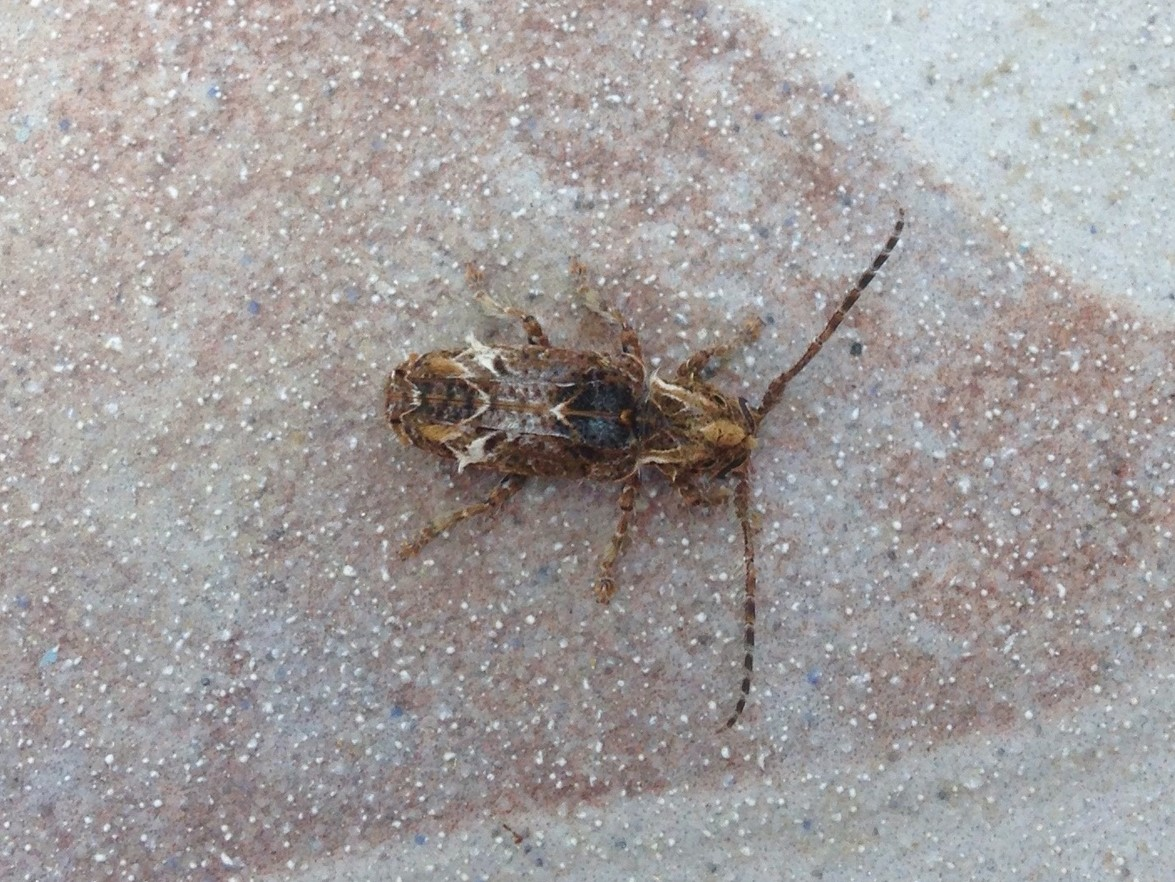

Scientific classification
- Kingdom: Animalia
- Phylum: Arthropoda
- Clade: Pancrustacea
- Class: Insecta
- Order: Coleoptera
- Suborder: Polyphaga
- Infraorder: Cucujiformia
- Family: Cerambycidae
- Genus: Desmiphora
- Species: D. hirticollis

Binomial name
- Desmiphora hirticollis (Olivier, 1795)

Synonyms
- Desmiphora intricata Casey, 1913; Desmiphora lanata Chevrolat, 1862; Desmiphora mexicana Thomson, 1860

= Desmiphora hirticollis =

Species of beetle

Desmiphora hirticollis is a species of beetle in the family Cerambycidae. It was described by Guillaume-Antoine Olivier in 1795. It has been found from the United States to South America, including the Galapagos Islands, Puerto Rico, Jamaica, and the Caribbean.
