= Desmiphora ornata =

Scientific classification
- Domain: Eukaryota
- Kingdom: Animalia
- Phylum: Arthropoda
- Class: Insecta
- Order: Coleoptera
- Suborder: Polyphaga
- Infraorder: Cucujiformia
- Family: Cerambycidae
- Genus: Desmiphora
- Species: D. ornata

Binomial name
- Desmiphora ornata Bates, 1866

Species of beetle

Desmiphora ornata is a species of beetle in the family Cerambycidae. It was described by Henry Walter Bates in 1866. It is known from Brazil.
