= Desmiphora pallida =

Scientific classification
- Domain: Eukaryota
- Kingdom: Animalia
- Phylum: Arthropoda
- Class: Insecta
- Order: Coleoptera
- Suborder: Polyphaga
- Infraorder: Cucujiformia
- Family: Cerambycidae
- Genus: Desmiphora
- Species: D. pallida

Binomial name
- Desmiphora pallida Bates, 1874

Species of beetle

Desmiphora pallida is a species of beetle in the family Cerambycidae. It was described by Henry Walter Bates in 1874. It is known from Brazil, Bolivia, Jamaica and Peru.
