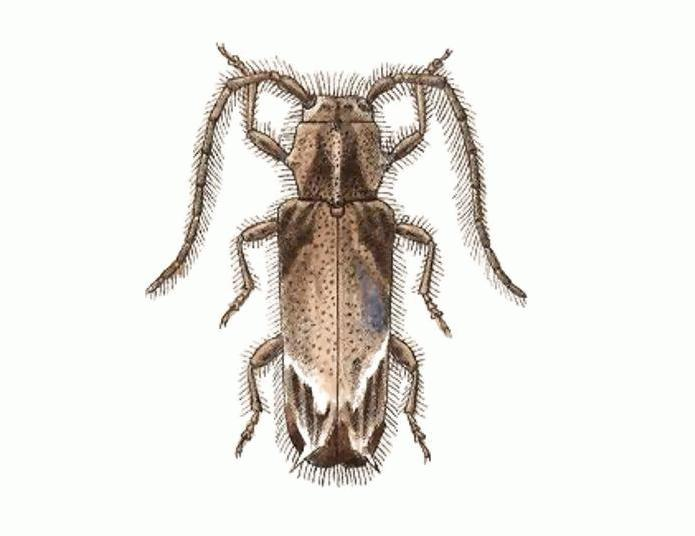

Scientific classification
- Kingdom: Animalia
- Phylum: Arthropoda
- Class: Insecta
- Order: Coleoptera
- Suborder: Polyphaga
- Infraorder: Cucujiformia
- Family: Cerambycidae
- Genus: Desmiphora
- Species: D. canescens

Binomial name
- Desmiphora canescens Bates, 1874

Synonyms
- Desmiphora obliquemaculata Breuning, 1942

= Desmiphora canescens =

Species of beetle

Desmiphora canescens is a species of beetle in the family Cerambycidae. It was described by Henry Walter Bates in 1874. It is known from Colombia, Mexico, and Venezuela.
