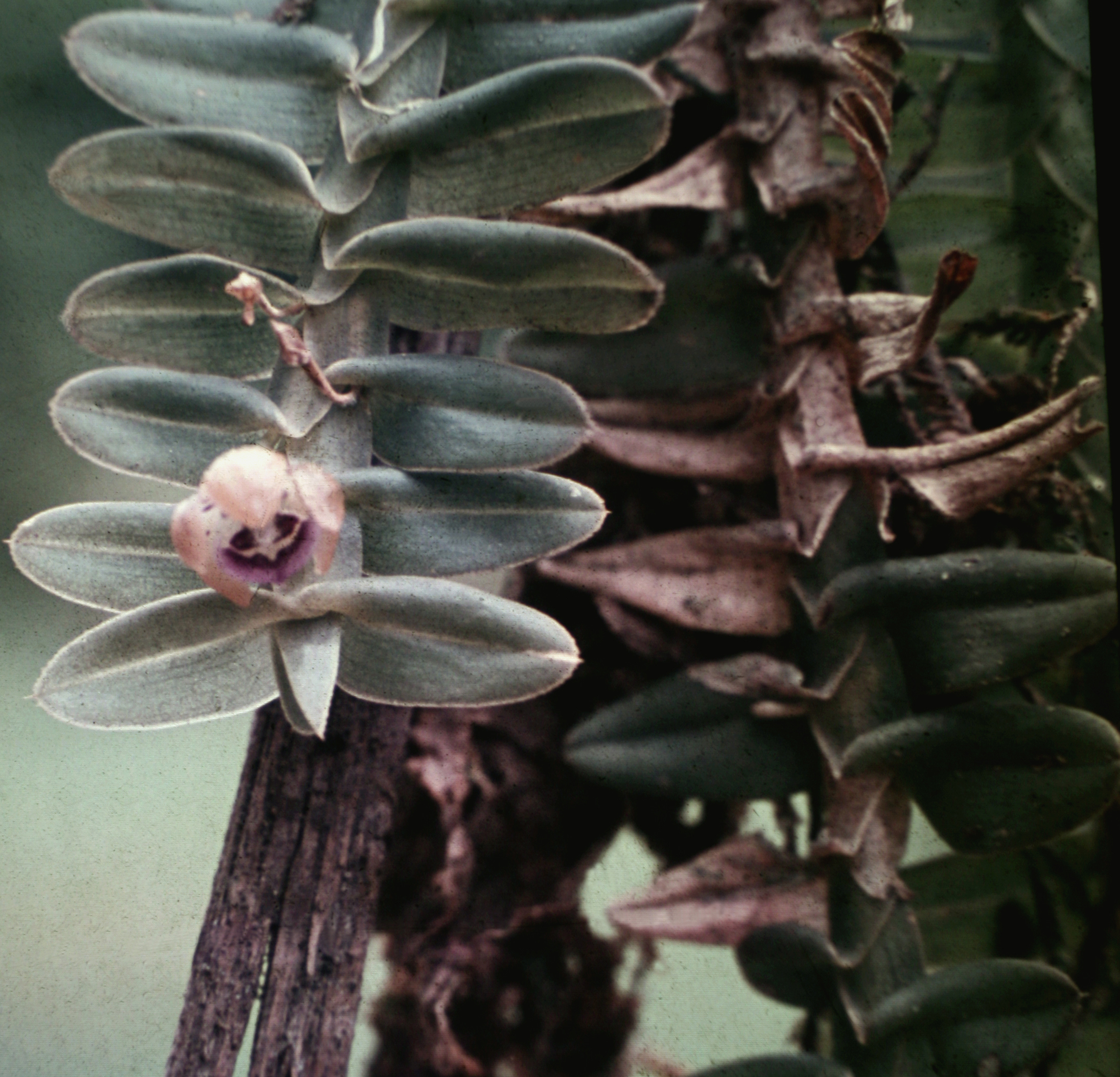
- Dichaea muricata

Scientific classification
- Kingdom: Plantae
- Clade: Tracheophytes
- Clade: Angiosperms
- Clade: Monocots
- Order: Asparagales
- Family: Orchidaceae
- Subfamily: Epidendroideae
- Tribe: Cymbidieae
- Subtribe: Zygopetalinae
- Genus: Dichaea; Lindl. (1833)

Selected species
- Dichaea ancoraelabia; Dichaea australis; Dichaea ciliolata; Dichaea cognizuxiana; Dichaea echinocarpa; Dichaea glauca; Dichaea graminoides; Dichaea histrio; Dichaea hystricina; Dichaea kegeli; Dichaea latifolia; Dichaea morrissii; Dichaea muricata; Dichaea neglecta; Dichaea panamensis; Dichaea pendula; Dichaea picta; Dichaea squarrosa; Dichaea trulla

Synonyms
- Dichaeopsis Pfitzer (1887)

= Dichaea =

Genus of orchids

Dichaea is a genus of plants in family Orchidaceae. It contains about 100 species native to tropical America.
