= Desmiphora lenkoi =

Scientific classification
- Domain: Eukaryota
- Kingdom: Animalia
- Phylum: Arthropoda
- Class: Insecta
- Order: Coleoptera
- Suborder: Polyphaga
- Infraorder: Cucujiformia
- Family: Cerambycidae
- Genus: Desmiphora
- Species: D. lenkoi

Binomial name
- Desmiphora lenkoi (Lane, 1959)

Species of beetle

Desmiphora lenkoi is a species of beetle in the family Cerambycidae. It was described by Lane in 1959. It is known from Brazil. It feeds on the willow-leaf red quebracho.
