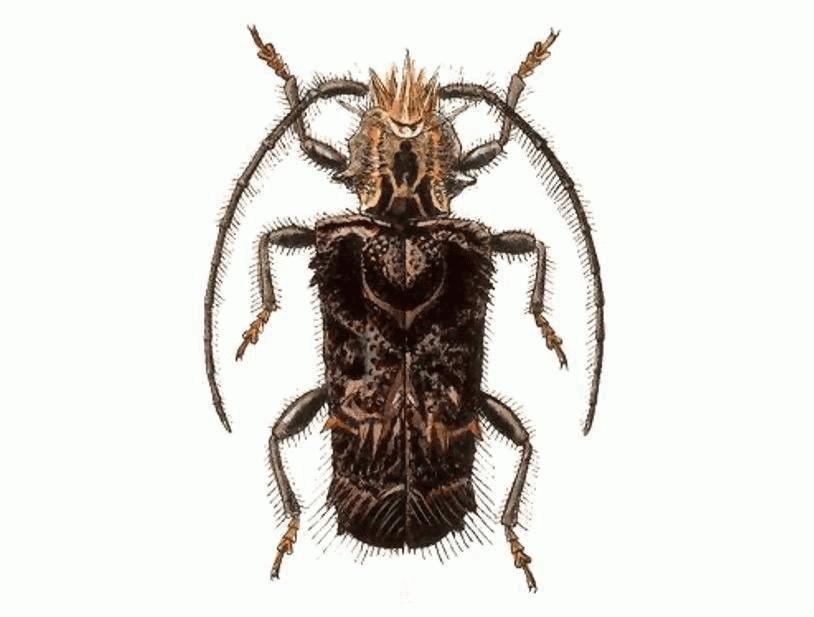

Scientific classification
- Kingdom: Animalia
- Phylum: Arthropoda
- Clade: Pancrustacea
- Class: Insecta
- Order: Coleoptera
- Suborder: Polyphaga
- Infraorder: Cucujiformia
- Family: Cerambycidae
- Genus: Desmiphora
- Species: D. fasciculata

Binomial name
- Desmiphora fasciculata (Olivier, 1792)

Synonyms
- Cerambyx fasciculatus Olivier, 1792 nec DeGeer, 1775; Desmiphora gigantea Thomson, 1860; Desmiphora servillei White, 1855

= Desmiphora fasciculata =

Species of beetle

Desmiphora fasciculata is a species of beetle in the family Cerambycidae. It was described by Guillaume-Antoine Olivier in 1792. It is known from Brazil, Bolivia, Ecuador, French Guiana, and Mexico.
