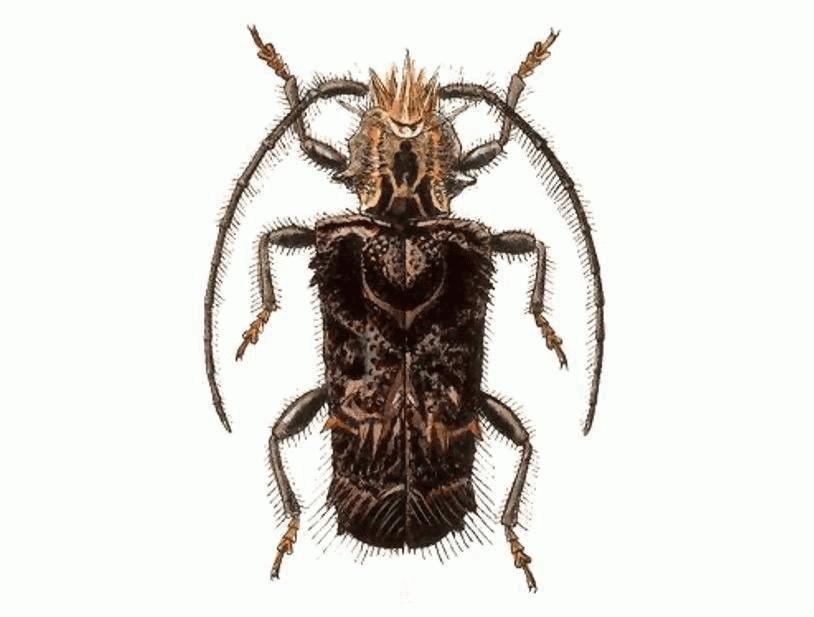
- Desmiphora fasciculata

Scientific classification
- Domain: Eukaryota
- Kingdom: Animalia
- Phylum: Arthropoda
- Class: Insecta
- Order: Coleoptera
- Suborder: Polyphaga
- Infraorder: Cucujiformia
- Family: Cerambycidae
- Subfamily: Lamiinae
- Tribe: Desmiphorini
- Genus: Desmiphora; Audinet-Serville, 1835

= Desmiphora =

Genus of beetles

Desmiphora is a genus of longhorn beetles of the subfamily Lamiinae, containing the following species:

subgenus Antenniphora

- Desmiphora antennalis Breuning, 1947
- Desmiphora endibauna Galileo & Martins, 1998
- Desmiphora magnifica Martins & Galileo, 1995

subgenus Desmiphora

- Desmiphora aegrota Bates, 1880
- Desmiphora amioca Galileo & Martins, 1998
- Desmiphora apicata (Thomson, 1868)
- Desmiphora astrigae Tavakilian & Néouze, 2004
- Desmiphora auatinga Martins & Galileo, 1996
- Desmiphora barbata Martins & Galileo, 2005
- Desmiphora bijuba Giesbert, 1998
- Desmiphora boliviana Breuning, 1948
- Desmiphora canescens Bates, 1874
- Desmiphora cayennensis Tavakilian & Néouze, 2004
- Desmiphora chemsaki Giesbert, 1998
- Desmiphora circumspecta (Lane, 1973)
- Desmiphora cirrosa Erichson, 1847
- Desmiphora compacta Breuning, 1942
- Desmiphora compta Martins & Galileo, 2005
- Desmiphora crinita Giesbert, 1998
- Desmiphora crocata Melzer, 1935
- Desmiphora cucullata Thomson, 1868
- Desmiphora decora (Melzer, 1928)
- Desmiphora digna Giesbert, 1998
- Desmiphora dozieri Galileo & Martins, 2007
- Desmiphora durantoni Tavakilian & Néouze, 2004
- Desmiphora elegantula White, 1855
- Desmiphora fasciculata (Olivier, 1792)
- Desmiphora fasciola Martins & Galileo, 1995
- Desmiphora ferruginea (Thomson, 1868)
- Desmiphora flavescens Breuning, 1943
- Desmiphora fuscosignata Breuning, 1942
- Desmiphora hirticollis (Olivier, 1795)
- Desmiphora intonsa (Germar, 1824)
- Desmiphora jullienae Tavakilian & Néouze, 2004
- Desmiphora kawensis Tavakilian & Néouze, 2004
- Desmiphora lanuginosa Breuning, 1942
- Desmiphora lateralis Thomson, 1868
- Desmiphora laterialba Breuning, 1942
- Desmiphora lenkoi (Lane, 1959)
- Desmiphora lineatipennis Breuning, 1943
- Desmiphora longipilis (Fisher, 1926)
- Desmiphora maculosa Linsley & Chemsak, 1966
- Desmiphora mirim Martins & Galileo, 2002
- Desmiphora mulsa Giesbert, 1998
- Desmiphora multicristata Bates, 1866
- Desmiphora neoflavescens Galileo & Martins, 1998
- Desmiphora nigroannulata Martins & Galileo, 2002
- Desmiphora niveocincta (Lane, 1959)
- Desmiphora obliquelineata Breuning, 1948
- Desmiphora ornata Bates, 1866
- Desmiphora pallida Bates, 1874
- Desmiphora picta Breuning, 1943
- Desmiphora pitanga Galileo & Martins, 1998
- Desmiphora pretiosa Melzer, 1935
- Desmiphora rufocristata Melzer, 1935
- Desmiphora santossilvai Galileo & Martins, 2003
- Desmiphora sarryi Tavakilian & Néouze, 2004
- Desmiphora scapularis Bates, 1885
- Desmiphora senicula Bates, 1866
- Desmiphora spitzi Melzer, 1935
- Desmiphora tigrinata Martins & Galileo, 2002
- Desmiphora travassosi Mendes, 1938
- Desmiphora tristis Galileo & Martins, 2003
- Desmiphora undulatofasciata Breuning, 1942
- Desmiphora unicolor Breuning, 1961
- Desmiphora uniformis Galileo & Martins, 2003
- Desmiphora variola Giesbert, 1998
- Desmiphora venosa Bates, 1866
- Desmiphora x-signata Melzer, 1935
- Desmiphora xerophila Martins & Galileo, 1995
