= Desmiphora nigroannulata =

Scientific classification
- Domain: Eukaryota
- Kingdom: Animalia
- Phylum: Arthropoda
- Class: Insecta
- Order: Coleoptera
- Suborder: Polyphaga
- Infraorder: Cucujiformia
- Family: Cerambycidae
- Genus: Desmiphora
- Species: D. nigroannulata

Binomial name
- Desmiphora nigroannulata Martins & Galileo, 2002

Species of beetle

Desmiphora nigroannulata is a species of beetle in the family Cerambycidae. It was described by Martins and Galileo in 2002. It is known from Brazil and French Guiana.
