= Desmiphora rufocristata =

Scientific classification
- Kingdom: Animalia
- Phylum: Arthropoda
- Class: Insecta
- Order: Coleoptera
- Suborder: Polyphaga
- Infraorder: Cucujiformia
- Family: Cerambycidae
- Genus: Desmiphora
- Species: D. rufocristata

Binomial name
- Desmiphora rufocristata Melzer, 1935

Species of beetle

Desmiphora rufocristata is a species of beetle in the family Cerambycidae. It was described by Melzer in 1935. It is known from Brazil.
