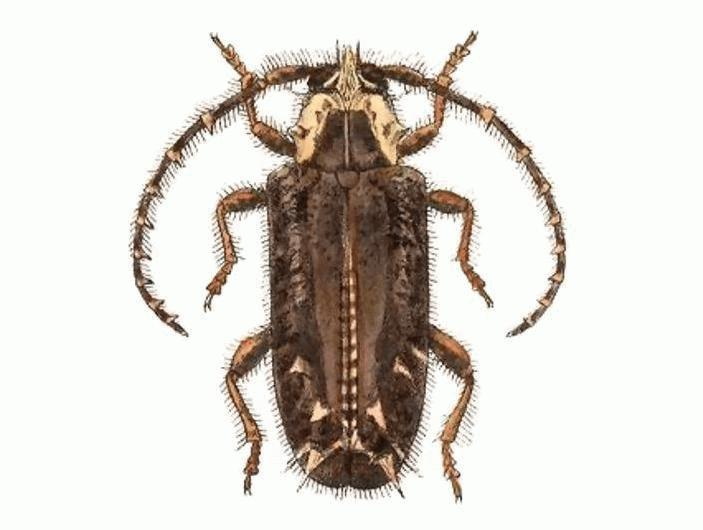

Scientific classification
- Kingdom: Animalia
- Phylum: Arthropoda
- Clade: Pancrustacea
- Class: Insecta
- Order: Coleoptera
- Suborder: Polyphaga
- Infraorder: Cucujiformia
- Family: Cerambycidae
- Genus: Desmiphora
- Species: D. cirrosa

Binomial name
- Desmiphora cirrosa Erichson, 1847

= Desmiphora cirrosa =

Species of beetle

Desmiphora cirrosa is a species of beetle in the family Cerambycidae. It was described by Wilhelm Ferdinand Erichson in 1847. It is found in Mexico (Nayarit, Veracruz, Tamaulipas, Quintana Roo, Jalisco, Chiapas, Tabasco), Guatemala, Honduras, Nicaragua (Chontales, Granada), Costa Rica (Guanacaste, Limón, Puntarenas, Heredia, San José), Panama, Ecuador, Peru, French Guiana, Brazil (Amazonas, Ceará, Bahia, Mato Grosso do Sul, Minas Gerais, Espírito Santo, Rio de Janeiro, São Paulo, Paraná, Santa Catarina, Rio Grande do Sul), Bolivia (Santa Cruz, Tarija), Argentina (Tucumán, Formosa, Misiones), Paraguay and Uruguay.
