= Desmiphora travassosi =

Scientific classification
- Domain: Eukaryota
- Kingdom: Animalia
- Phylum: Arthropoda
- Class: Insecta
- Order: Coleoptera
- Suborder: Polyphaga
- Infraorder: Cucujiformia
- Family: Cerambycidae
- Genus: Desmiphora
- Species: D. travassosi

Binomial name
- Desmiphora travassosi Mendes, 1938

Species of beetle

Desmiphora travassosi is a species of beetle in the family Cerambycidae. It was described by Mendes in 1938. It is known from Brazil.
