= Desmiphora dozieri =

Scientific classification
- Domain: Eukaryota
- Kingdom: Animalia
- Phylum: Arthropoda
- Class: Insecta
- Order: Coleoptera
- Suborder: Polyphaga
- Infraorder: Cucujiformia
- Family: Cerambycidae
- Genus: Desmiphora
- Species: D. dozieri

Binomial name
- Desmiphora dozieri Galileo & Martins, 2007

Species of beetle

Desmiphora dozieri is a species of beetle in the family Cerambycidae. It was described by Galileo and Martins in 2007. It is known from Bolivia.
