= Desmiphora santossilvai =

Scientific classification
- Domain: Eukaryota
- Kingdom: Animalia
- Phylum: Arthropoda
- Class: Insecta
- Order: Coleoptera
- Suborder: Polyphaga
- Infraorder: Cucujiformia
- Family: Cerambycidae
- Genus: Desmiphora
- Species: D. santossilvai

Binomial name
- Desmiphora santossilvai Galileo & Martins, 2003

Species of beetle

Desmiphora santossilvai is a species of beetle in the family Cerambycidae. It was described by Galileo and Martins in 2003. It is known from Brazil and French Guiana.
