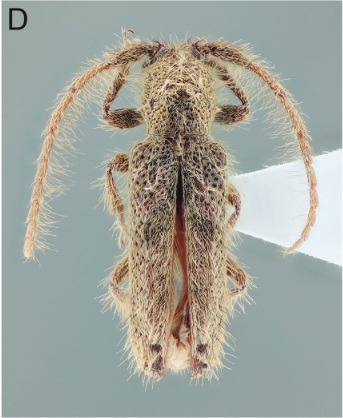

Scientific classification
- Kingdom: Animalia
- Phylum: Arthropoda
- Clade: Pancrustacea
- Class: Insecta
- Order: Coleoptera
- Suborder: Polyphaga
- Infraorder: Cucujiformia
- Family: Cerambycidae
- Genus: Desmiphora
- Species: D. intonsa

Binomial name
- Desmiphora intonsa (Germar, 1824)

Synonyms
- Lamia intonsa Germar, 1823

= Desmiphora intonsa =

Species of beetle

Desmiphora intonsa is a species of beetle in the family Cerambycidae. It was described by Ernst Friedrich Germar in 1824. It is known from Bolivia, Argentina, Brazil, Paraguay, and Uruguay.
