= Desmiphora cucullata =

Scientific classification
- Domain: Eukaryota
- Kingdom: Animalia
- Phylum: Arthropoda
- Class: Insecta
- Order: Coleoptera
- Suborder: Polyphaga
- Infraorder: Cucujiformia
- Family: Cerambycidae
- Genus: Desmiphora
- Species: D. cucullata

Binomial name
- Desmiphora cucullata Thomson, 1868

Species of beetle

Desmiphora cucullata is a species of beetle in the family Cerambycidae. It was described by Thomson in 1868. It is known from Argentina, Brazil, Paraguay, and Uruguay.
