= Desmiphora decora =

Scientific classification
- Kingdom: Animalia
- Phylum: Arthropoda
- Class: Insecta
- Order: Coleoptera
- Suborder: Polyphaga
- Infraorder: Cucujiformia
- Family: Cerambycidae
- Genus: Desmiphora
- Species: D. decora

Binomial name
- Desmiphora decora (Melzer, 1928)

Species of beetle

Desmiphora decora is a species of beetle in the family Cerambycidae. It was described by Melzer in 1928. It is known from Brazil.
