= Desmiphora antennalis =

Scientific classification
- Kingdom: Animalia
- Phylum: Arthropoda
- Class: Insecta
- Order: Coleoptera
- Suborder: Polyphaga
- Infraorder: Cucujiformia
- Family: Cerambycidae
- Genus: Desmiphora
- Species: D. antennalis

Binomial name
- Desmiphora antennalis Breuning, 1947

Species of beetle

Desmiphora antennalis is a species of beetle in the family Cerambycidae. It was described by Stephan von Breuning in 1947. It is known from Brazil.
