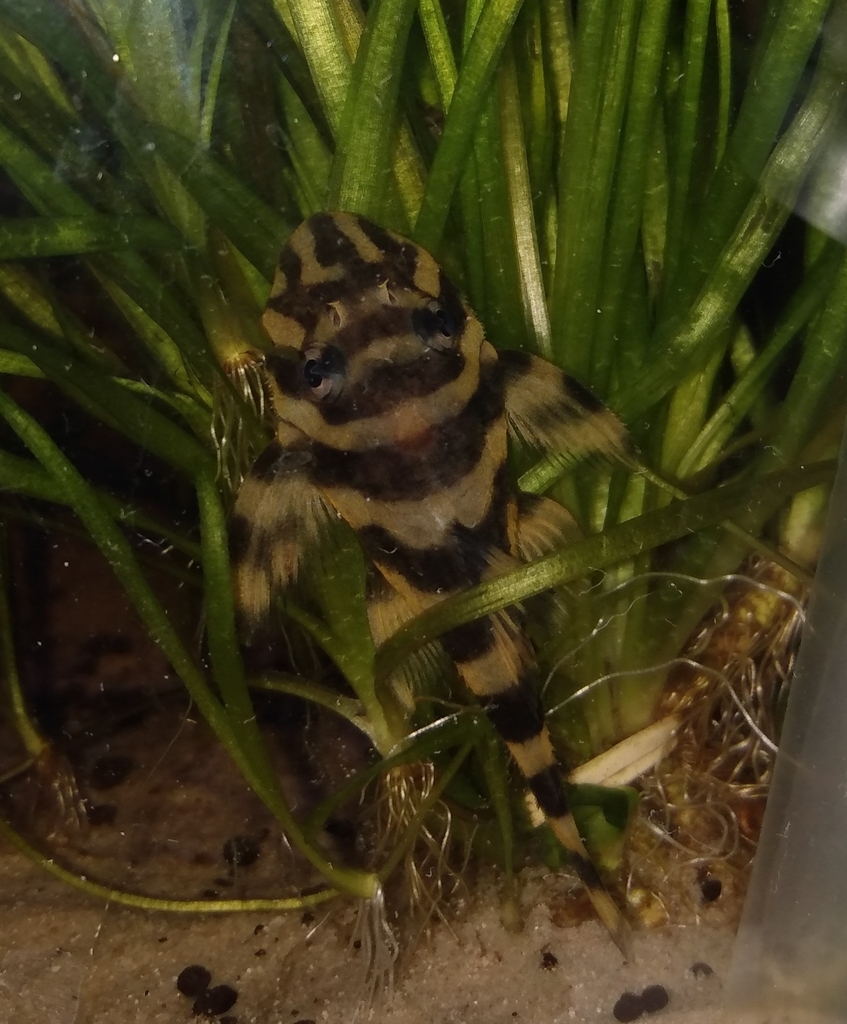

Conservation status
- Least Concern (IUCN 3.1)

Scientific classification
- Kingdom: Animalia
- Phylum: Chordata
- Class: Actinopterygii
- Order: Siluriformes
- Family: Loricariidae
- Genus: Dekeyseria
- Species: D. picta

Binomial name
- Dekeyseria picta (Kner, 1854)

Synonyms
- Ancistrus pictus Kner, 1854; Peckoltia picta (Kner, 1854); Zonancistrus pictus (Kner, 1854); Peckoltia brachyura (Kner 1854); Dekeyseria brachyura (Kner, 1854); Ancistrus (Hemiancistrus) pulcher Steindachner, 1915; Peckoltia pulcher (Steindachner 1915); Zonancistrus pulcher (Steindachner 1915); Dekeyseria pulchra (Steindachner 1915)

= Dekeyseria picta =

Species of fish

Dekeyseria picta is a species of freshwater ray-finned fish belonging to the family Loricariidae, the suckermouth armoured catfishes, and the subfamily Hypostominae, the suckermouth catfishes. This catfish is found in the basin of the Rio Negro in Brazil and in the Orinoco basin in Colombia and Venezuela. Here it is found around rocks, rapids and sunken logs. This species reaches a standard length of 13 cm (5.1 in). This species is found in the aquarium trade, where it is sometimes called the Urubaxi butterfly pleco or flounder pleco and has been identified by the numbers L168 and L052.
