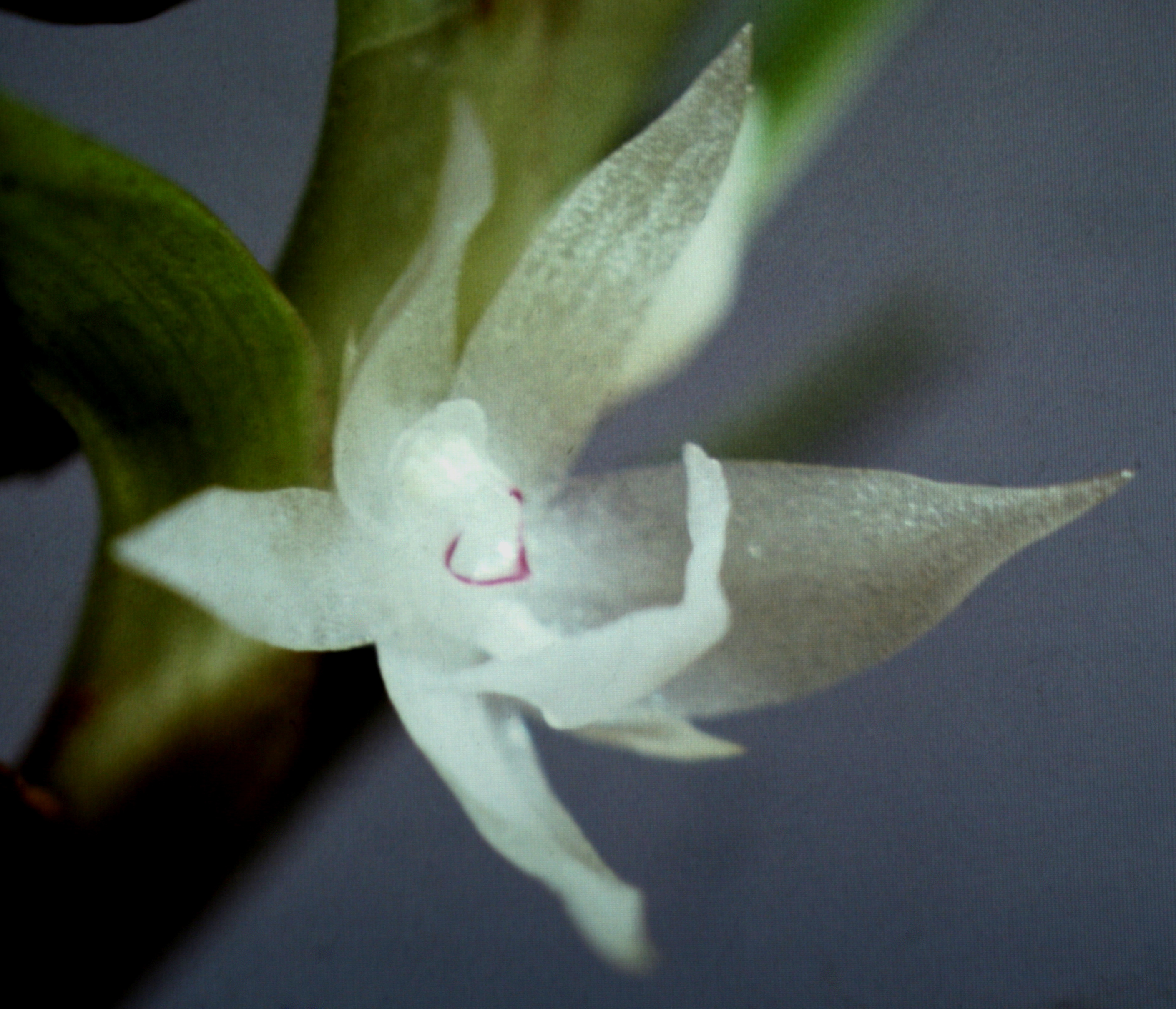

Scientific classification
- Kingdom: Plantae
- Clade: Tracheophytes
- Clade: Angiosperms
- Clade: Monocots
- Order: Asparagales
- Family: Orchidaceae
- Subfamily: Epidendroideae
- Genus: Dichaea
- Species: D. picta

Binomial name
- Dichaea picta Rchb.f.

Synonyms
- Epithecia picta (Rchb.f.) Schltr.; Dichaea hookeri Garay & H.R.Sweet

= Dichaea picta =

Species of orchid

Dichaea picta is a species of orchid.
