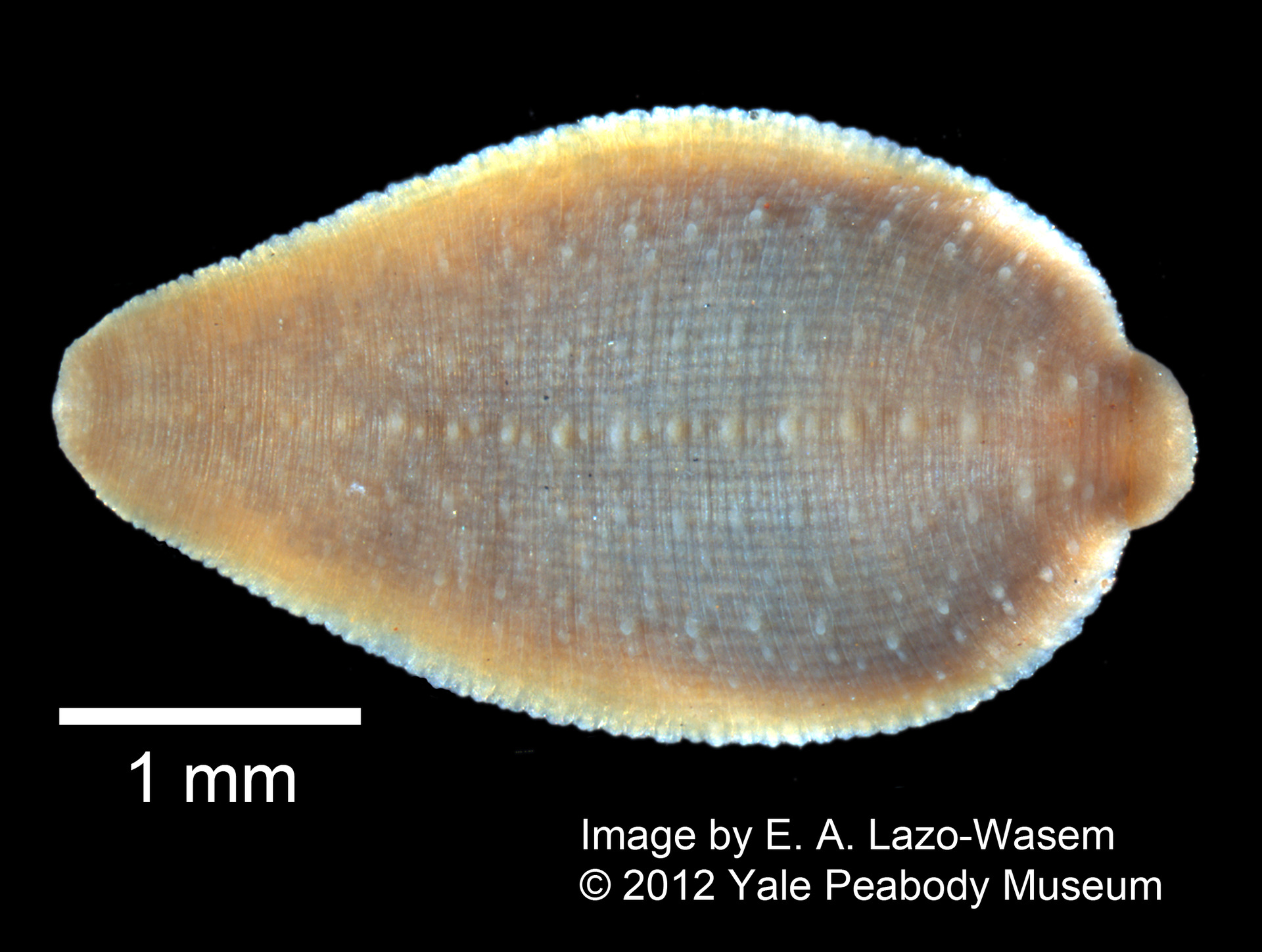
- An close-up image of Desserobdella picta

Scientific classification
- Kingdom: Animalia
- Phylum: Annelida
- Clade: Pleistoannelida
- Clade: Sedentaria
- Class: Clitellata
- Subclass: Hirudinea
- Order: Rhynchobdellida
- Family: Glossiphoniidae
- Genus: Desserobdella
- Species: D. picta

Binomial name
- Desserobdella picta (Verrill, 1872)

Synonyms
- Synonymy: Batracobdella picta (Verrill, 1872); Clepsine picta Verrill, 1872; Placobdella picta (Verrill, 1872)

= Desserobdella picta =

Species of annelid

Desserobdella picta is a species of leech widespread across North America. They are members of the phylum Annelida, or "segmented worms".

Desserobdella picta most commonly feeds on the blood of amphibians, but have also been recorded feeding on turtles.

== Taxonomy ==
The species was previously known as Batracobdella picta and was first described by American zoologist Addison Emery Verrill in 1972. The former name being changed by John R. Barta and Roy T. Sawyer.

== Physiology ==
The salivary glands of Desserobdella picta consist of a foregut, midgut and a hindgut. Their salivary cells are scattered diffusely and are located on either side of the proboscis in an almost linear distribution. Their salivary stomata are roughly spherical and roughly uniform in size. The plasmalemma of D. picta have electron-dense membranes which are highly-folded with deep invagination.

Desserobdella picta does not have muscular jaws, salivary papillae, vaginal tube, and friction rays on their caudal sucker. They feed haematophagously, a tubular ovisac, U-shaped ejaculatory duct, and a brooded cocoon.

Cross-section of a leech depicting its internal anatomy

== Feeding ==
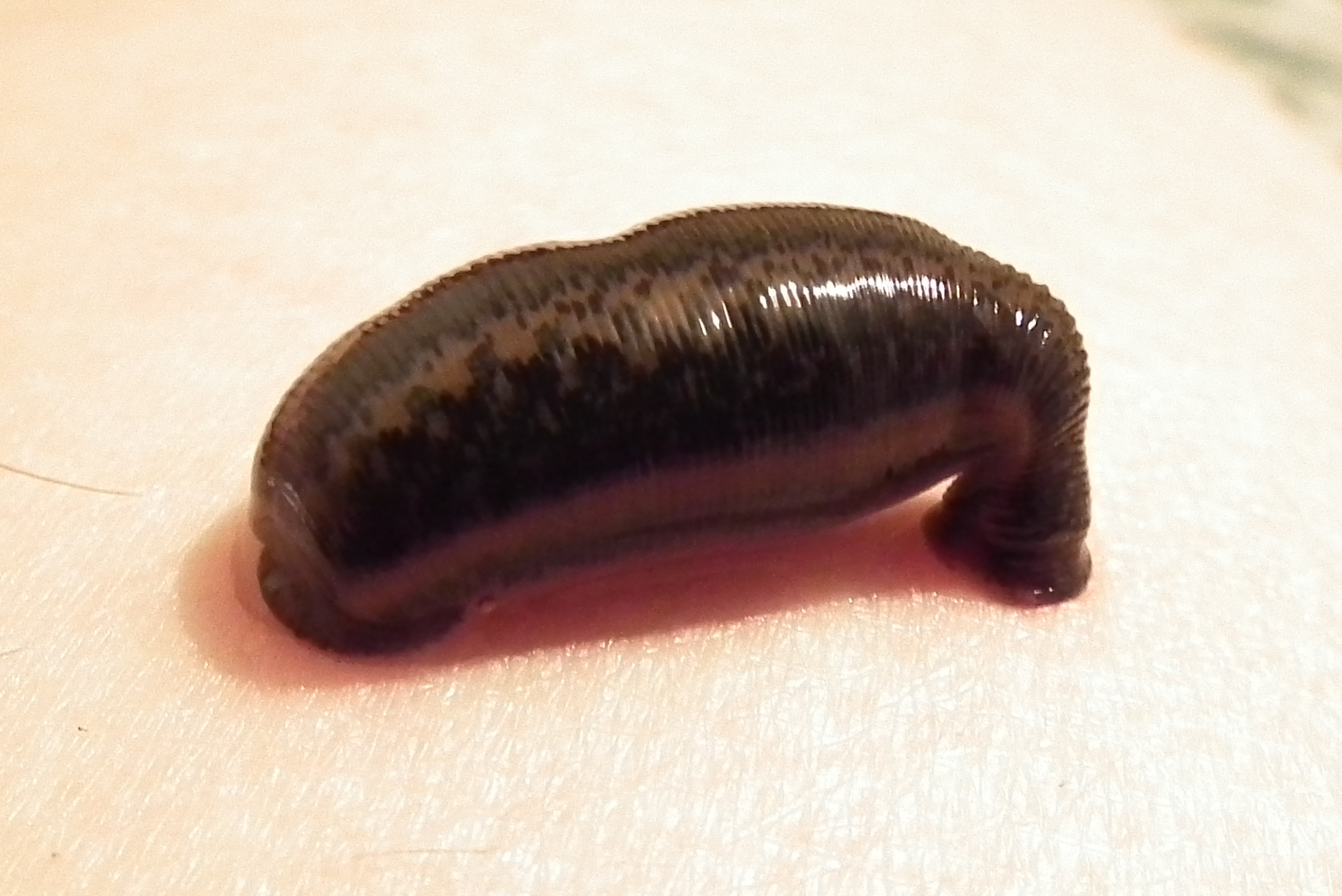
A different species of leech feeding. This depicts the way the leech looks when feeding on prey.

Desserobdella picta relies on bacterial symbionts contained in their mycetomes. The symbionts belong to a new genus of Alphaproteobacteria (Reichenowia) closely related to the Rhizobiaceae.

== Movement ==
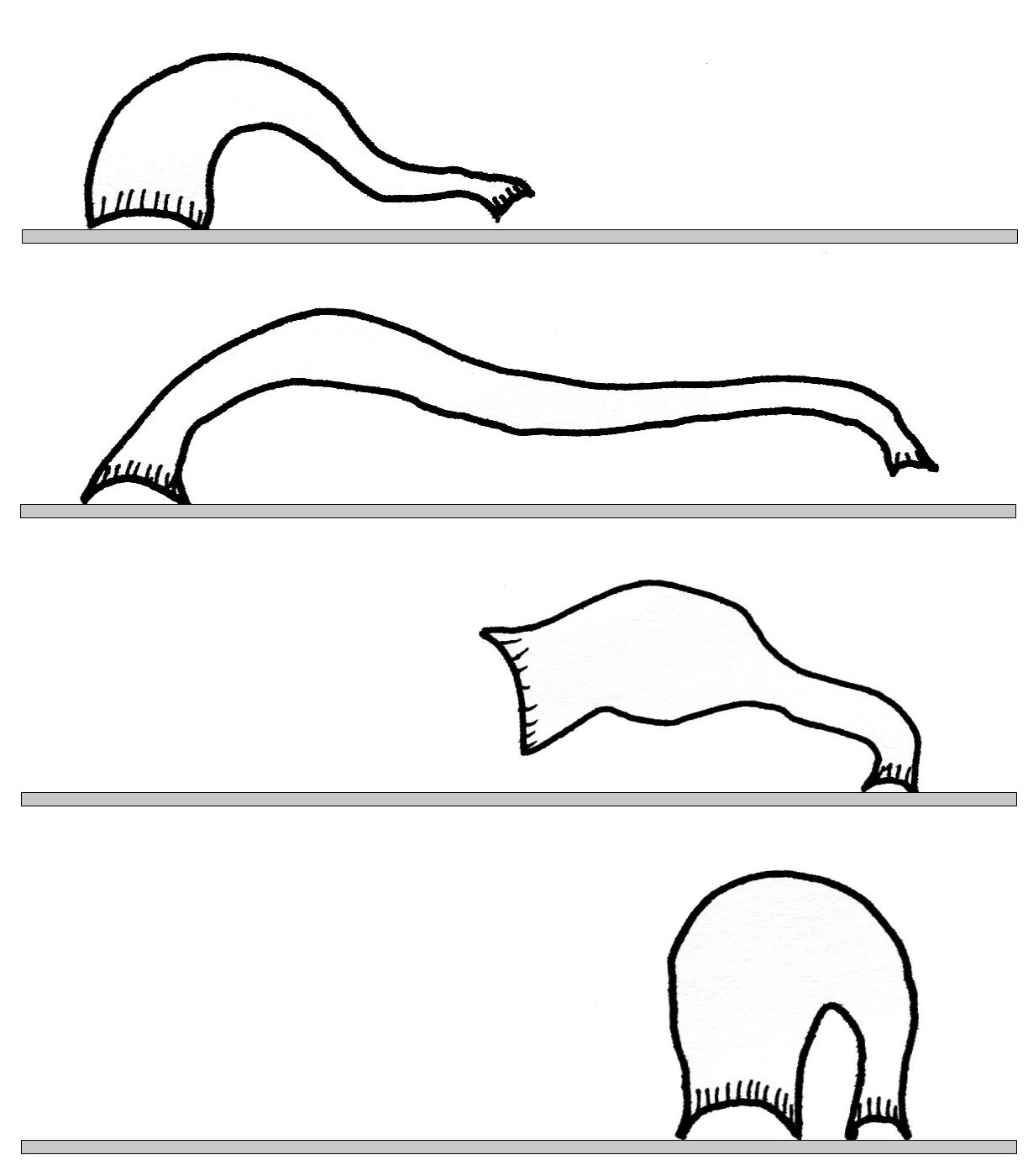
An image depicting the looping movement by leeches
