= Desmiphora compacta =

Scientific classification
- Kingdom: Animalia
- Phylum: Arthropoda
- Class: Insecta
- Order: Coleoptera
- Suborder: Polyphaga
- Infraorder: Cucujiformia
- Family: Cerambycidae
- Genus: Desmiphora
- Species: D. compacta

Binomial name
- Desmiphora compacta Breuning, 1942

Species of beetle

Desmiphora compacta is a species of beetle in the family Cerambycidae. It was described by Stephan von Breuning in 1942. It is known to be found in Brazil and Paraguay.
