= Dejerosa =

Scientific classification
- Kingdom: Animalia
- Phylum: Arthropoda
- Subphylum: Chelicerata
- Class: Arachnida
- Order: Araneae
- Infraorder: Araneomorphae
- Family: Lycosidae
- Genus: Dejerosa
- Species: D. picta

Binomial name
- Dejerosa picta Roewer, 1960

Genus of spiders

Dejerosa is a genus of spiders in the family Lycosidae. It was first described in 1960 by Roewer. As of 2017, it contains only one species, Dejerosa picta, found in Mozambique.
