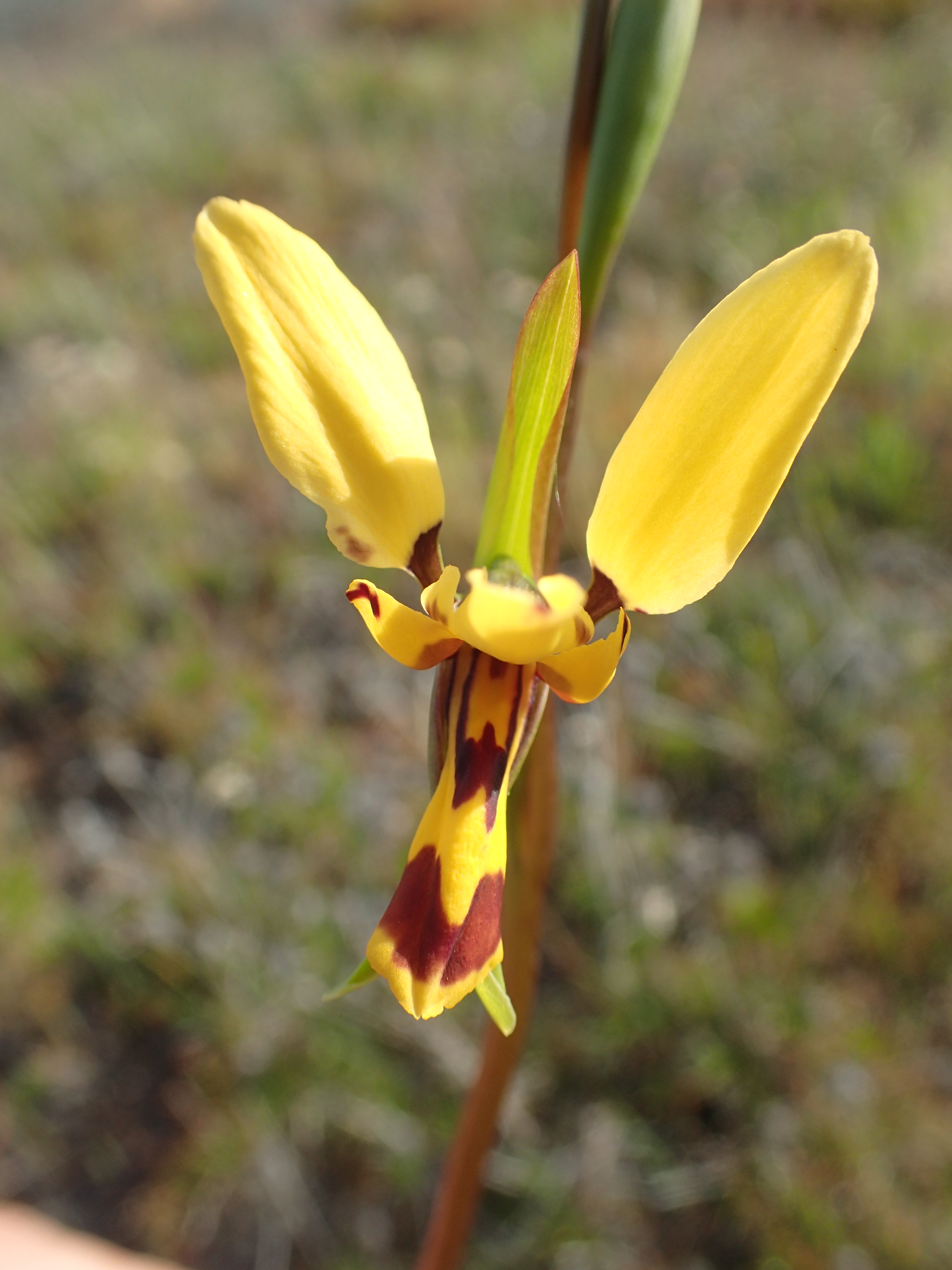
- Near the western edge of Wave Rock

Scientific classification
- Kingdom: Plantae
- Clade: Embryophytes
- Clade: Tracheophytes
- Clade: Angiosperms
- Clade: Monocots
- Order: Asparagales
- Family: Orchidaceae
- Subfamily: Orchidoideae
- Tribe: Diurideae
- Genus: Diuris
- Species: D. picta

Binomial name
- Diuris picta J.Drumm.

= Diuris picta =

Granite bee orchid

Species of orchid

Diuris picta, commonly called the granite bee orchid or granite donkey orchid, is a species of orchid which is endemic to the south-west of Western Australia. It has between three and five leaves at its base and up to eight creamy-white to yellow flowers with brownish purple markings. It grows on granite outcrops between Menzies and Lake King.

== Description ==
Diuris picta is a tuberous, perennial herb with between three and five leaves at its base, each leaf 80–150 mm (3–6 in) long and 2–4 mm (0.08–0.2 in) wide. Up to eight creamy-white to yellow flowers with brownish purple markings, 20–30 mm (0.8–1 in) long and 12–15 mm (0.5–0.6 in) wide are borne on a flowering stem 200–350 mm (8–10 in) tall. The dorsal sepal curves upwards, 15–20 mm (0.6–0.8 in) long and 9–11 mm (0.35–0.43 in) wide. The lateral sepals are 18–22 mm (0.7–0.9 in) long, 3–4 mm (0.1–0.2 in) wide and turned downwards. The petals are more or less erect or turned backwards, spread widely apart from each other, 13–17 mm (0.5–0.7 in) long and 9–11 mm (0.35–0.43 in) wide on a dark green stalk 4–7 mm (0.2–0.3 in) long. The labellum is 15–18 mm (0.6–0.7 in) long and has three lobes. The centre lobe is broadly egg-shaped, 12–15 mm (0.5–0.6 in) long and wide and the side lobes are 6–9 mm (0.2–0.4 in) long and 4–6 mm (0.16–0.24 in) wide. There are two parallel callus ridges 7–9 mm (0.28–0.35 in) long near the mid-line of the base of the labellum. Flowering occurs in September and October.

== Taxonomy and naming ==
Diuris picta was first formally described in 1853 by James Drummond and the description was published in Hooker's Journal of Botany and Kew Garden Miscellany. The specific epithet (picta) is a Latin word meaning "coloured" or "painted".

== Distribution and habitat ==
The granite bee orchid grows between Menzies and Lake King in the Avon Wheatbelt, Coolgardie, Mallee and Yalgoo biogeographic regions.

== Conservation ==
Diuris picta is classified as "not threatened" by the Western Australian Government Department of Parks and Wildlife.
