= Baryancistrus micropunctatus =

Scientific classification
- Kingdom: Animalia
- Phylum: Chordata
- Class: Actinopterygii
- Order: Siluriformes
- Family: Loricariidae
- Genus: Baryancistrus
- Species: B. micropunctatus

Binomial name
- Baryancistrus micropunctatus R. R. de Oliveira, Rapp Py-Daniel & Oyakawa, 2019

Species of catfish

Baryancistrus micropunctatus is a species of catfish in the family Loricariidae. It is native to South America, where it occurs in the Jari River basin. The species was described in 2019 by Renildo Ribeiro de Oliveira, Lúcia Rapp Py-Daniel, and Osvaldo Takeshi Oyakawa alongside the species Baryancistrus hadrostomus on the basis of coloration and other characteristics. Its color pattern is noted to be similar to that of its congener Baryancistrus longipinnis, which occurs in the Tocantins River basin.
