= L200 =

L200 or L-200 may refer to:

- Mitsubishi Triton (L200), a compact pickup truck
- Saturn L-Series L200, an automobile by General Motors
- Daihatsu Mira, third generation, an automobile
- Let L-200 Morava, a two-engine touring and light passenger aircraft
- Baryancistrus demantoides, a species of catfish
- Hemiancistrus subviridis, a species of catfish
- Bumar Fadroma L200 polish wheel loader
- L200 (foam), a type of EVA foam used in special effects makeup, floor mats, etc.
