= Pseudancistrus megacephalus =

Conservation status
- Critically endangered, possibly extinct (IUCN 3.1)

Scientific classification
- Kingdom: Animalia
- Phylum: Chordata
- Class: Actinopterygii
- Division: Teleostei
- Order: Siluriformes
- Family: Loricariidae
- Genus: Pseudancistrus
- Species: P. megacephalus

Binomial name
- Pseudancistrus megacephalus (Günther, 1868)

Synonyms
- Chaetostomus megacephalus Günther, 1868; Hemiancistrus megacephalus (Günther, 1868); Chaetostomus macrops Lütken, 1874; Hemiancistrus macrops (Lütken, 1874)

Species of fish

Pseudancistrus megacephalus is a species of freshwater ray-finned fish belonging to the family Loricariidae, the suckermouth armoured catfishes, and the subfamily Hypostominae, the suckermouth catfishes. It is of uncertain and disputed classification.

== Description ==
Pseudancistrus megacephalus is a small-to-medium-sized loricariid, reaching 12.3 cm (4.8 in) in standard length.

== Distribution ==
Pseudancistrus megacephalus is native to South America, where it occurs in the Essequibo River basin in Guyana, as well as the Atlantic coastal drainage of Suriname. The exact locality at which it has been found within Suriname's coastal drainage is unknown, although its presence in the region has been stated.

== Taxonomy ==
Pseudancistrus megacephalus was originally described as Chaetostomus megacephalus by Albert Günther in 1868. In 1904, it was listed as a member of Ancistrus by Charles Tate Regan. In 1889, it was reclassified as a member of Hemiancistrus by Carl H. Eigenmann and Rosa Smith Eigenmann, a classification which C. H. Eigenmann later used in 1912. This classification was subsequently followed by Isaäc J. H. Isbrücker in 1980, among others. FishBase and multiple other sources still place the species within Hemiancistrus.

In 2015, a review conducted by Jonathan W. Armbruster, David C. Werneke, and Milton Tan found the species Chaetostomus macrops (described in 1874 by Christian Frederik Lütken and also at some point placed within Hemiancistrus) to be synonymous with P. megacephalus, which was transferred to the genus Pseudancistrus. In 2018, it was suggested by Sonia Fisch-Muller, Jan Mol, and Raphaël Covain that P. megacephalus may belong to Guyanancistrus, although its classification is still uncertain. Fisch-Muller, Mol, and Covain also suggested that Chaetostomus macrops may be a distinct species and not a synonym of P. megacephalus.
