= Hypostomus papariae =

Scientific classification
- Domain: Eukaryota
- Kingdom: Animalia
- Phylum: Chordata
- Class: Actinopterygii
- Order: Siluriformes
- Family: Loricariidae
- Genus: Hypostomus
- Species: H. papariae

Binomial name
- Hypostomus papariae (Fowler, 1941)

Synonyms
- Plecostomus plecostomus papariae

Species of catfish

Hypostomus papariae is a species of catfish in the family Loricariidae. It is native to South America, where it is believed to occur in the Potenji River basin in the state of Rio Grande do Norte in Brazil. The species reaches 11.4 cm (4.5 inches) in total length and is believed to be a facultative air-breather. The specific epithet papariae likely refers to Lake Papari, which the species is known from, an etymology shared with another loricariid species, Pseudancistrus papariae.
