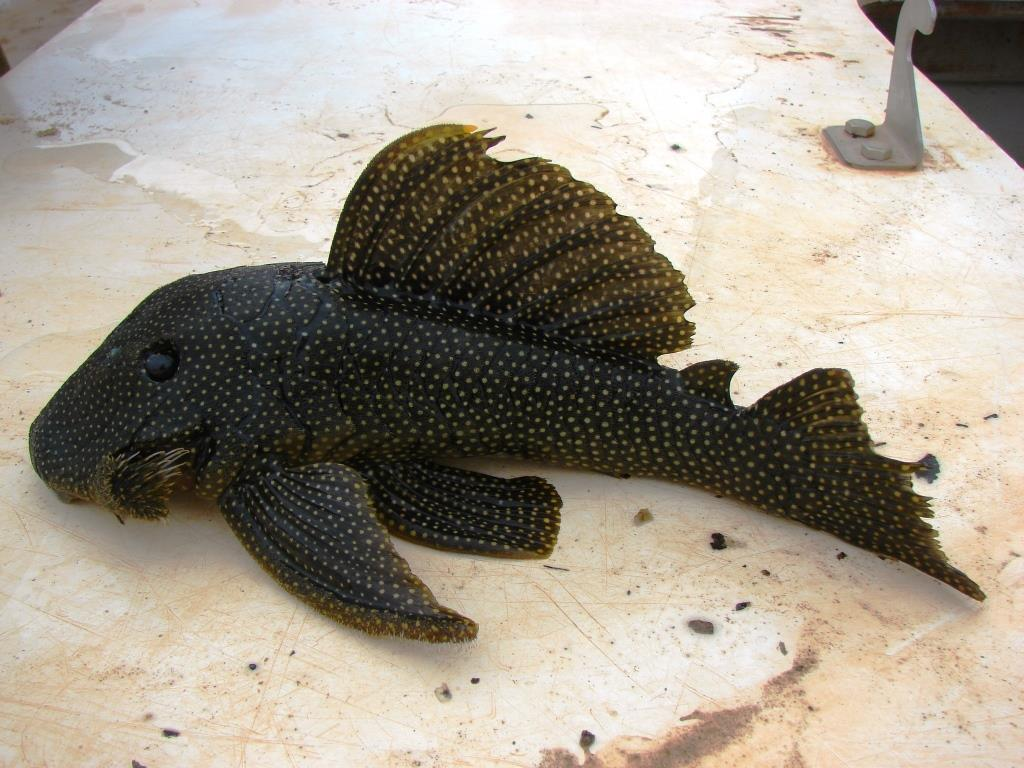
- Baryancistrus niveatus

Scientific classification
- Kingdom: Animalia
- Phylum: Chordata
- Class: Actinopterygii
- Order: Siluriformes
- Family: Loricariidae
- Subfamily: Hypostominae
- Genus: Baryancistrus; Rapp Py-Daniel, 1989

Type species
- Hypostomus niveatus Castelnau, 1855

= Baryancistrus =

Genus of fishes

Baryancistrus is a genus of freshwater ray-finned fishes belonging to the family Loricariidae, the suckermouth armoured catfishes, and the subfamily Hypostominae, the suckermouth catfishes. They inhabit flowing sections of rivers, especially clearwater, in the basins of the Amazon (notably Trombetas, Tapajós, Xingu and Tocantins) and Orinoco (notably Ventuari) in Brazil and Venezuela. The largest species reach up to 34 cm (13 in) in total length.

Most Baryancistrus are differentiated from other related genera by a membrane connecting their dorsal fin and adipose fin, not present in most other genera.

The species of this genus are mainly herbivores and detritivores, but may take other foods in an aquarium setting. Most have probably not been bred in captivity. It is difficult to sex these fish, including adult specimens. These fish are mainly nocturnal, but will also emerge from their hiding places during the day, after some time getting accustomed to the aquarium. Adequate hiding places are recommended for these fish due to their primary nocturnal nature.

== Species ==
Baryancistrus contains the following valid species:

- Baryancistrus beggini Lujan, Arce H. & Armbruster, 2009
- Baryancistrus chrysolomus Rapp Py-Daniel, Zuanon & R. R. de Oliveira, 2011
- Baryancistrus demantoides Werneke, Sabaj Pérez, Lujan & Armbruster, 2005
- Baryancistrus hadrostomus R. R. de Oliveira, Rapp Py-Daniel & Oyakawa, 2019
- Baryancistrus isaaci R. R. de Oliveira & Rapp Py-Daniel, 2025
- Baryancistrus longipinnis (Kindle, 1895)
- Baryancistrus micropunctatus R. R. de Oliveira, Rapp Py-Daniel & Oyakawa, 2019
- Baryancistrus niveatus (Castelnau, 1855)
- Baryancistrus quilombola R. R. de Oliveira & Rapp Py-Daniel, 2025
- Baryancistrus xanthellus Rapp Py-Daniel, Zuanon & R. R. de Oliveira, 2011

== List of Baryancistrus sp. L-numbers ==
Though there are many types of fish described as Baryancistrus, there are many that yet to be given a true scientific designation, and are only referred to under the L-number system, including the Gold Nuggets. Here is a list of Baryancistrus by L-number designation. The common name and scientific name are included when available, though some of these fish are only commonly referred to by their L-number. For those fish without a scientific name, they are assumed to be Baryancistrus sp.

L-number(s) or LDA	Common name(s)	Scientific name
L003	Kieser pleco	
L018, L085	Gold Nugget pleco	Baryancistrus xanthellus
L019		
L026		Baryancistrus niveatus
L047	Magnum pleco, Mango pleco	Baryancistrus chrysolomus
L057		
L081	Gold Nugget pleco	Baryancistrus xanthellus
L084		
L115, L248	Mega snowball pleco	
L142, LDA33	Big White Spot pleco	
L177	Iriri Gold Nugget pleco	Baryancistrus xanthellus
L200*		Baryancistrus demantoides
L219		
L274		
L239	Blue Panaque	Baryancistrus beggini
L319		
L323		
L324		
L364		
L384		
LDA60	gold nugget	Baryancistrus xanthellus

* Note: L200 is also used to refer to Hemiancistrus subviridis, another Loricariid that is very similar in appearance to B. demantoides.

== See also ==
- List of freshwater aquarium fish species
