= Hemiancistrus medians =

Conservation status
- Least Concern (IUCN 3.1)

Scientific classification
- Kingdom: Animalia
- Phylum: Chordata
- Class: Actinopterygii
- Order: Siluriformes
- Family: Loricariidae
- Genus: Hemiancistrus
- Species: H. medians

Binomial name
- Hemiancistrus medians (Kner, 1854)

Synonyms
- Ancistrus medians Kner, 1854

Species of catfish

Hemiancistrus medians is a species of freshwater ray-finned fish belonging to the family Loricariidae, the suckermouth armoured catfishes, and the subfamily Hypostominae, the suckermouth catfishes. This catfish is found in South America, where it occurs in the Maroni basin in French Guiana and Suriname. This species is usually found in rapids with a strong current and a substrate of large, shelter-providing rocks. It is known to coexist with the species Bryconops caudomaculatus, Chasmocranus longior, Harttia surinamensis, Hypostomus gymnorhynchus, Jupiaba meunieri, Leporinus granti, and Parodon guyanensis. This species is large for a loricariid, reaching a total length of 39 cm (15 in). H. medians is the type species of the genus Hemiancistrus.
