= Pseudancistrus corantijniensis =

Conservation status
- Least Concern (IUCN 3.1)

Scientific classification
- Kingdom: Animalia
- Phylum: Chordata
- Class: Actinopterygii
- Division: Teleostei
- Order: Siluriformes
- Family: Loricariidae
- Genus: Pseudancistrus
- Species: P. corantijniensis

Binomial name
- Pseudancistrus corantijniensis De Chambrier & Montoya-Burgos, 2008

Species of fish

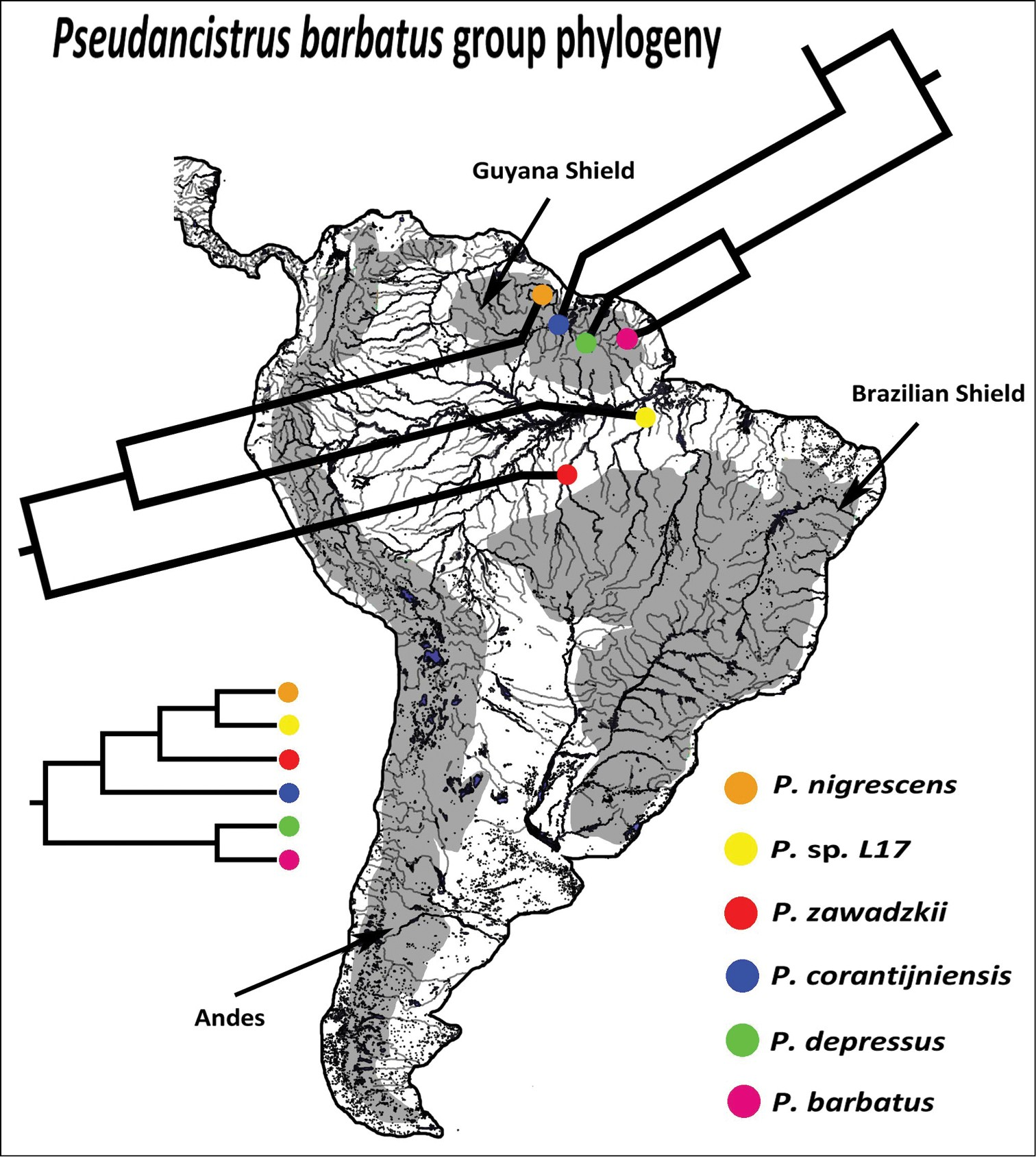
Distribution of several Pseudancistrus species, with P. corantijniensis shown in blue

Pseudancistrus corantijniensis is a species of freshwater ray-finned fish belonging to the family Loricariidae, the suckermouth armoured catfishes, and the subfamily Hypostominae, the suckermouth catfishes. This catfish is found in South America, where it occurs in the rapids along the middle and upper reaches of the Corantijn River on the border of Guyana and Suriname, although it may be more widespread than is currently known. This species reaches a total length of 17.9 cm (7.0 in). The specific name, corantijniensis, means "of the Corantjin", the type locality.

Pseudancistrus corantijniensis was described in 2008 by Sophie de Chambrier and Juan Ignacio Montoya-Burgos, based on a morphological and molecular analysis, with its type locality given as the Kaw Falls on the Corantjin River at 4°59'48.3"N, 57°37'49.5"W in the Sipaliwini District of Suriname.
