= Hemiancistrus megalopteryx =

Conservation status
- Endangered (IUCN 3.1)

Scientific classification
- Kingdom: Animalia
- Phylum: Chordata
- Class: Actinopterygii
- Order: Siluriformes
- Family: Loricariidae
- Genus: Hemiancistrus
- Species: H. megalopteryx

Binomial name
- Hemiancistrus megalopteryx A. R. Cardoso, 2004

Species of catfish

Hemiancistrus megalopteryx is a species of freshwater ray-finned fish belonging to the family Loricariidae, the suckermouth armoured catfishes, and the subfamily Hypostominae, the suckermouth catfishes. This catfish is endemic to Brazil where it occurs in the Tubarão River in the state of Santa Catarina. This species reaches a standard length of 28.6 cm (11.3 in). The distribution of this species lies within the largest coal-mining region of Brazil and the International Union for Conservation of Nature have assessed its conservation status as Endangered due to extensive deforestation within the Tubarão basin.
