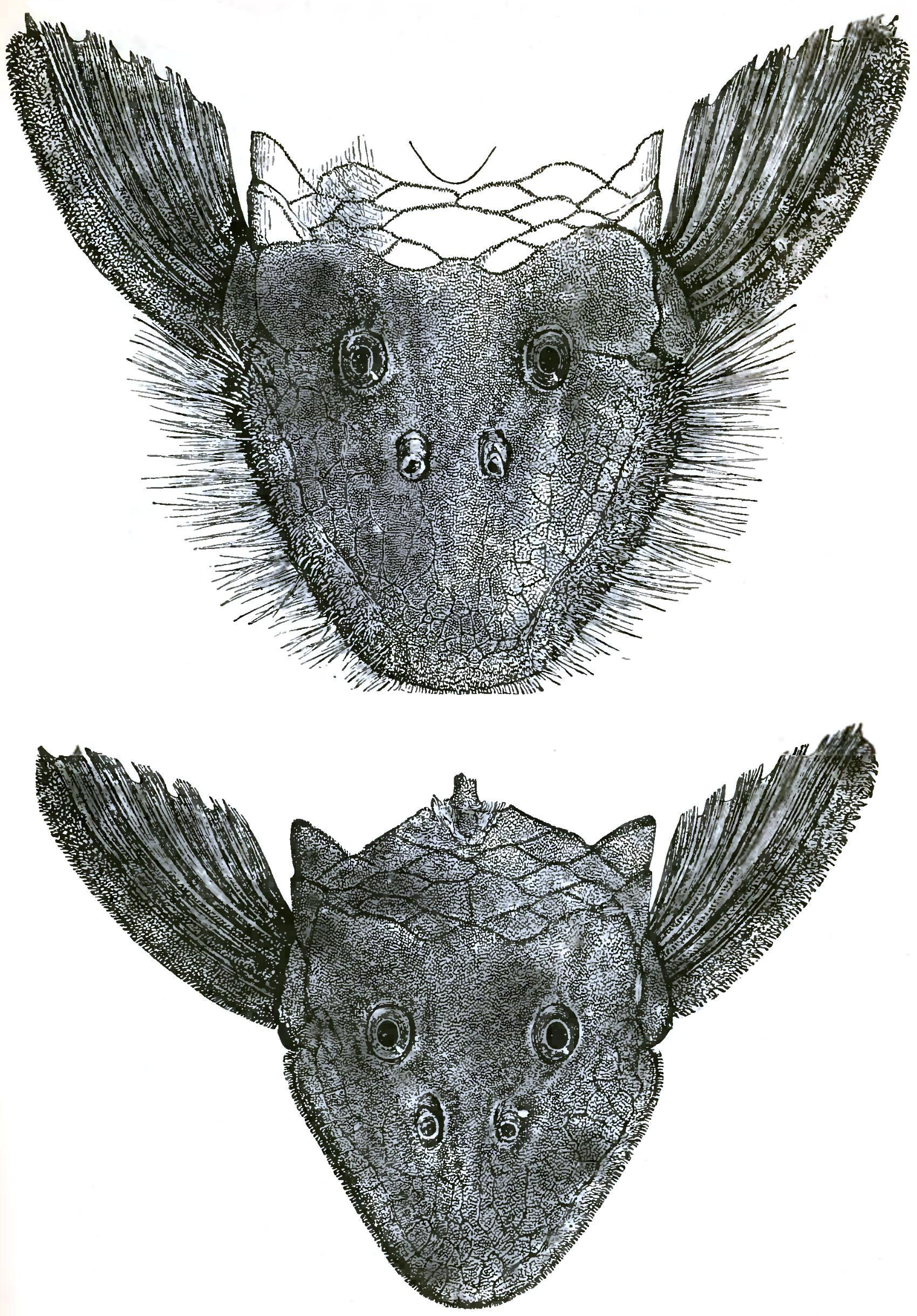

Conservation status
- Least Concern (IUCN 3.1)

Scientific classification
- Kingdom: Animalia
- Phylum: Chordata
- Class: Actinopterygii
- Division: Teleostei
- Order: Siluriformes
- Family: Loricariidae
- Genus: Pseudancistrus
- Species: P. barbatus

Binomial name
- Pseudancistrus barbatus (Valenciennes, 1840)

Synonyms
- Hypostomus barbatus Valenciennes, 1840; Hypostomus guttatus, Valenciennes, 1840; Ancistrus barbatus Steindachner, 1911; Pterygoplichthys barbatus (Steindachner, 1911)

= Pseudancistrus barbatus =

Species of catfish

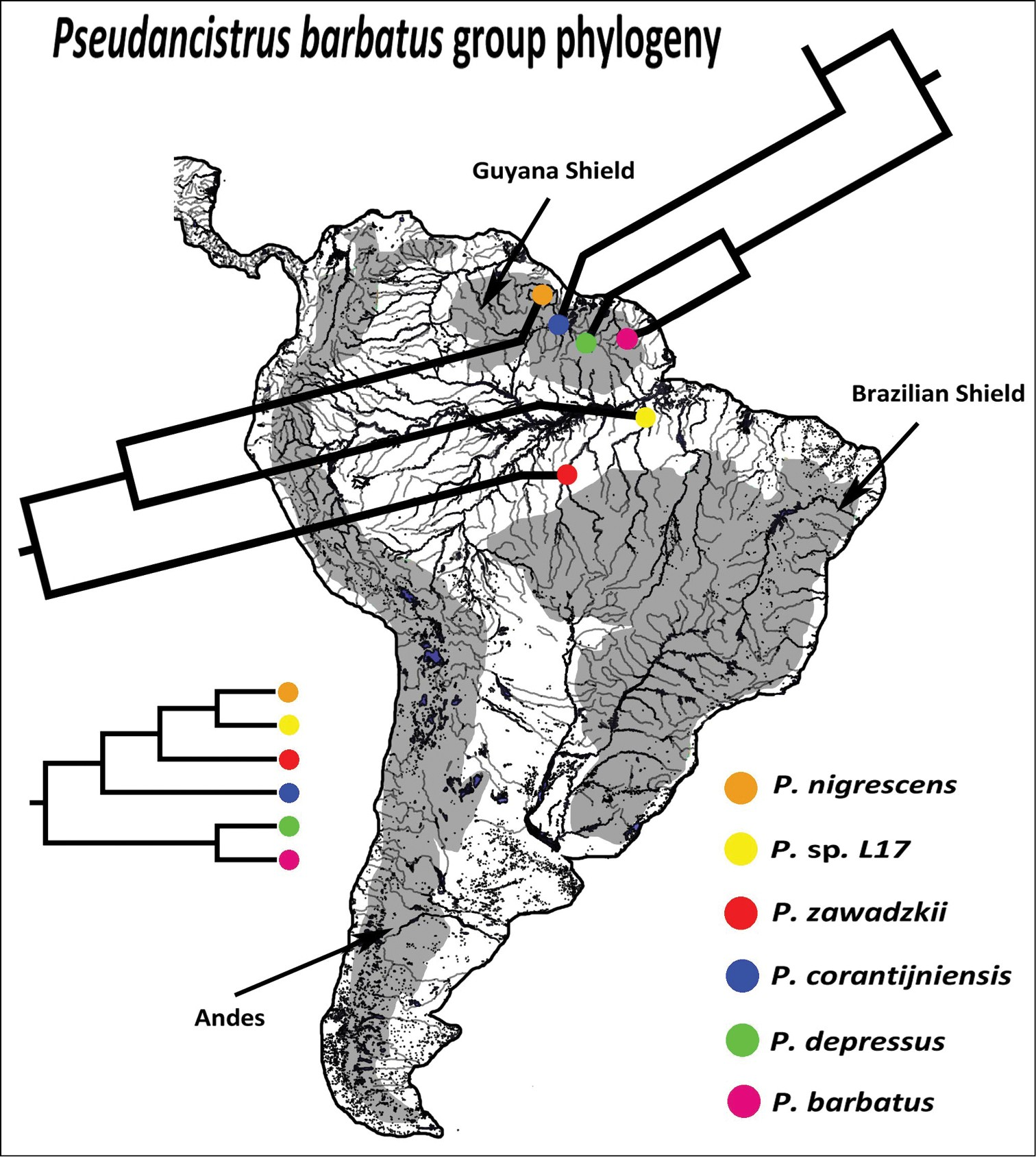
Distribution of several Pseudancistrus species, with P. barbatus shown in magenta.

Pseudancistrus barbatus, commonly known as the bearded catfish, is a species of catfish in the family Loricariidae. It is native to South America, where it occurs in the basins of the Oyapock, the Mana River, the Maroni, the Suriname River, the Courantyne River, and the Essequibo River. Within its range, the bearded catfish is typically found in rocky, fast-flowing rapids.

The bearded catfish reaches 20 cm (7.9 inches) in standard length, and it is believed that the length of the snout bristles on a male individual of the species may reflect the individual's hierarchic status within the population. It is known to be fished in shallow areas within its range using harpoons or bows. The species also occasionally appears in the aquarium trade, where it is sometimes referred to as the wreath pleco.
