= Hemiancistrus cerrado =

Conservation status
- Least Concern (IUCN 3.1)

Scientific classification
- Kingdom: Animalia
- Phylum: Chordata
- Class: Actinopterygii
- Order: Siluriformes
- Family: Loricariidae
- Genus: Hemiancistrus
- Species: H. cerrado

Binomial name
- Hemiancistrus cerrado L. S. de Souza, M. R. S. de Melo, Chamon & Armbruster, 2008

Species of catfish

Hemiancistrus cerrado is a species of freshwater ray-finned fish belonging to the family Loricariidae, the suckermouth armoured catfishes, and the subfamily Hypostominae, the suckermouth catfishes. This catfish is endemic to Brazil where it is found in the Bugre and Vermelho rivers and, probably, the Peixe River, all tributaries of the Araguaia, in the state of Goiás. This species reaches a standard length of 17 cm (6.7 in). The specific name, cerrado, is the name of the central region of Brazil where this species occurs.
