= Pseudancistrus kwinti =

Conservation status
- Least Concern (IUCN 3.1)

Scientific classification
- Kingdom: Animalia
- Phylum: Chordata
- Class: Actinopterygii
- Division: Teleostei
- Order: Siluriformes
- Family: Loricariidae
- Genus: Pseudancistrus
- Species: P. kwinti

Binomial name
- Pseudancistrus kwinti Willink, Mol & Chernoff, 2010

Species of fish

Pseudancistrus kwinti is a species of freshwater ray-finned fish belonging to the family Loricariidae, the suckermouth armoured catfishes, and the subfamily Hypostominae, the suckermouth catfishes. This catfish is endemic to Suriname, where it is found in the Coppename River drainage within the Central Suriname Nature Reserve in Sipaliwini District.

The species reaches a standard length of 9.4 cm (3.7 in).

P. kwinti was described in 2010 by Phil Willink of the Field Museum of Natural History, Jan Mol of Anton de Kom University of Suriname, and Barry Chernoff of Wesleyan University, on the basis of distinctive morphology and coloration.

Its specific name, kwinti, is the name of the Kwinti people who live along the Coppename River and who fish in the region of this species' type locality.
