= Hemiancistrus furtivus =

Scientific classification
- Kingdom: Animalia
- Phylum: Chordata
- Class: Actinopterygii
- Order: Siluriformes
- Family: Loricariidae
- Genus: Hemiancistrus
- Species: H. furtivus

Binomial name
- Hemiancistrus furtivus Provenzano & Barriga, 2017

Species of catfish

Hemiancistrus furtivusis a species of freshwater ray-finned fish belonging to the family Loricariidae, the suckermouth armoured catfishes, and the subfamily Hypostominae, the suckermouth catfishes. This catfish is found in South America, where it occurs in the Esmeraldas River basin in Ecuador. The species reaches 9.98 cm (3.9 inches) SL and was described in 2017 by Francisco Provenzano and Ramiro Barriga of the Central University of Venezuela, who report its placement in the genus Hemiancistrus to be tentative and suggest that it may belong to the tribe Hypostomini rather than Ancistrini, where it is currently placed. As of May 2022, FishBase does not list this species.
