= Hemiancistrus guahiborum =

Conservation status
- Least Concern (IUCN 3.1)

Scientific classification
- Kingdom: Animalia
- Phylum: Chordata
- Class: Actinopterygii
- Order: Siluriformes
- Family: Loricariidae
- Genus: Hemiancistrus
- Species: H. guahiborum

Binomial name
- Hemiancistrus guahiborum Werneke, Armbruster, Lujan & Taphorn, 2005

Species of catfish

Hemiancistrus guahiborum is a species of freshwater ray-finned fish belonging to the family Loricariidae, the suckermouth armoured catfishes, and the subfamily Hypostominae, the suckermouth catfishes. This catfish is found in the basin of the Orinoco in the Ventuari, Caura and Ocamo rivers, as well as the Casiquiare River, which connects the Orinoco to the Rio Negro, suggesting that H. guahiborum may be found in the Rio Negro basin too. It appears in the aquarium trade, where it is usually known either as the orange-seam pleco or by its L-number, which is L-106.
