= Hemiancistrus chlorostictus =

Conservation status
- Near Threatened (IUCN 3.1)

Scientific classification
- Kingdom: Animalia
- Phylum: Chordata
- Class: Actinopterygii
- Order: Siluriformes
- Family: Loricariidae
- Genus: Hemiancistrus
- Species: H. chlorostictus

Binomial name
- Hemiancistrus chlorostictus A. R. Cardoso & L. R. Malabarba, 1999

Species of catfish

Hemiancistrus chlorostictus is a species of freshwater ray-finned fish belonging to the family Loricariidae, the suckermouth armoured catfishes, and the subfamily Hypostominae, the suckermouth catfishes. This catfish is endemic to Brazil where it is found in the basin of the Uruguay River in the state of Rio Grande do Sul. This species reaches a standard length of 14.7 cm (5.8 in). H. chlorostictus has been assessed as Near Threatened by the International Union for Conservation of Nature because it has a rather restricted range which has, at least partially, been altered by hydroelectric schemes.n
