= Pseudancistrus zawadzkii =

Scientific classification
- Kingdom: Animalia
- Phylum: Chordata
- Class: Actinopterygii
- Division: Teleostei
- Order: Siluriformes
- Family: Loricariidae
- Genus: Pseudancistrus
- Species: P. zawadzkii

Binomial name
- Pseudancistrus zawadzkii Silva, Roxo, Britski & de Oliveira, 2014

Species of catfish

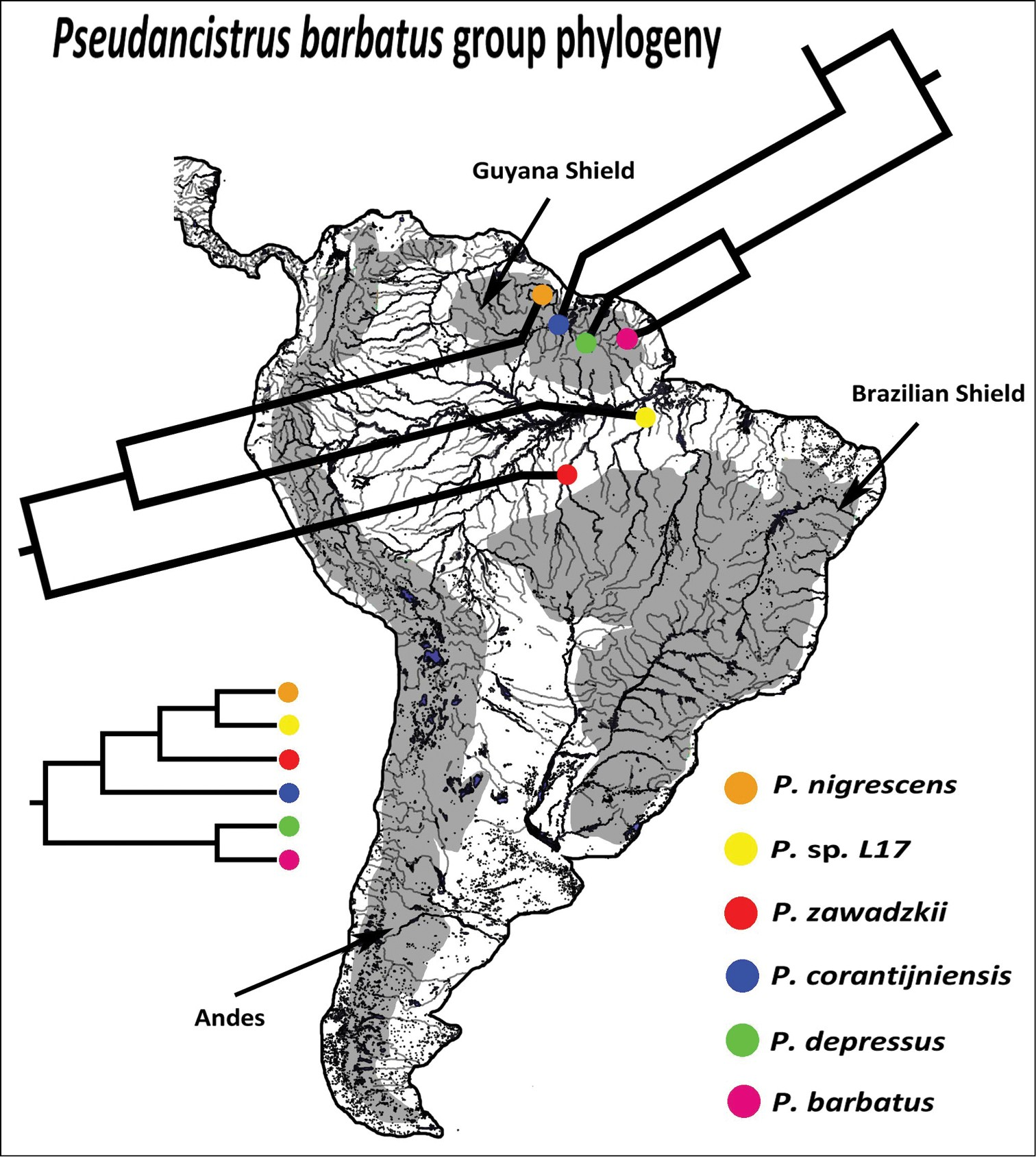
Distribution of several Pseudancistrus species, with P. zawadzkii shown in red.

Pseudancistrus zawadzkii is a species of freshwater ray-finned fish belonging to the family Loricariidae, the suckermouth armoured catfishes, and the subfamily Hypostominae, the suckermouth catfishes. This catfish occurs in the Tapajós basin, including the Tracuá River, in Brazil. It is typically found in areas with clear water, rocky outcrops, small waterfalls, and a substrate of rocks and sand. This species reaches a standard length of 12.9 cm (5.1 in).

Pseudancistrus zawadzkii was described in 2014 by Gabriel S. C. Silva, Fábio F. Roxo, and Claudio Oliveira (all of São Paulo State University), as well as Ricardo Britzke (of the National University of San Marcos).

== Etymology ==
Its specific epithet, zawadzkii, refers to Cláudio Henrique Zawadzki, a professor at the State University of Maringá, honoring his contributions to the study of Loricariidae.

== Aquarium Trade ==
Pseudancistrus zawadzkii sometimes appears in the aquarium trade, where it is typically known either as the Tapajós stream pleco or by its associated L-number, which is L-321.
