= Pseudancistrus asurini =

Scientific classification
- Kingdom: Animalia
- Phylum: Chordata
- Class: Actinopterygii
- Division: Teleostei
- Order: Siluriformes
- Family: Loricariidae
- Genus: Pseudancistrus
- Species: P. asurini

Binomial name
- Pseudancistrus asurini Silva, Roxo & de Oliveira, 2015

Species of catfish

Pseudancistrus asurini is a species of freshwater ray-finned fish belonging to the family Loricariidae, the suckermouth armoured catfishes, and the subfamily Hypostominae, the suckermouth catfishes. This catfish is found in South America, where it occurs in the Xingu River basin in the state of Pará in Brazil. The species reaches a total length of 25.1 cm (9.9 in).

== Etymology ==
Its specific epithet, asurini, refers to the Asurini people, native speakers of the Xingu Asurini language, who inhabit the Xingu basin near Altamira. It was described in 2015 by Gabriel S. C. Silva, Fábio F. Roxo, and Claudio Oliveira alongside the related species Pseudancistrus kayabi from the Tapajós basin.

== In the aquarium ==
Pseudancistrus asurini appears in the aquarium trade, where it is often referred to either as the yellow-seam pleco or by its associated L-number, which is L-067.
