= Pseudancistrus coquenani =

Conservation status
- Least Concern (IUCN 3.1)

Scientific classification
- Kingdom: Animalia
- Phylum: Chordata
- Class: Actinopterygii
- Division: Teleostei
- Order: Siluriformes
- Family: Loricariidae
- Genus: Pseudancistrus
- Species: P. coquenani

Binomial name
- Pseudancistrus coquenani (Steindachner, 1915)

Synonyms
- Ancistrus (Pseudancistrus) coquenani Steindachner, 1915

Species of catfish

Pseudancistrus coquenani is a species of freshwater ray-finned fish belonging to the family Loricariidae, the suckermouth armoured catfishes, and the subfamily Hypostominae, the suckermouth catfishes. This catfish is found in South America, where it occurs in the tributaries of the Tocoma, Paragua, Supamo and Claro rivers in the Caroní River basin, as well as in the Cuyuní River in Bolívar state, south-eastern Venezuela. This species reaches a total length of 8.1 cm (3.2 in).
