= Hemiancistrus fuliginosus =

Conservation status
- Least Concern (IUCN 3.1)

Scientific classification
- Kingdom: Animalia
- Phylum: Chordata
- Class: Actinopterygii
- Order: Siluriformes
- Family: Loricariidae
- Genus: Hemiancistrus
- Species: H. fuliginosus

Binomial name
- Hemiancistrus fuliginosus A. R. Cardoso & L. R. Malabarba, 1999

Species of catfish

Hemiancistrus fuliginosus is a species of freshwater ray-finned fish belonging to the family Loricariidae, the suckermouth armoured catfishes, and the subfamily Hypostominae, the suckermouth catfishes. This catfish is found in South America in the Uruguay River basin of Argentina, Brazil and Uruguay. This species reaches a standard length of 16.2 cm (6.4 in).
