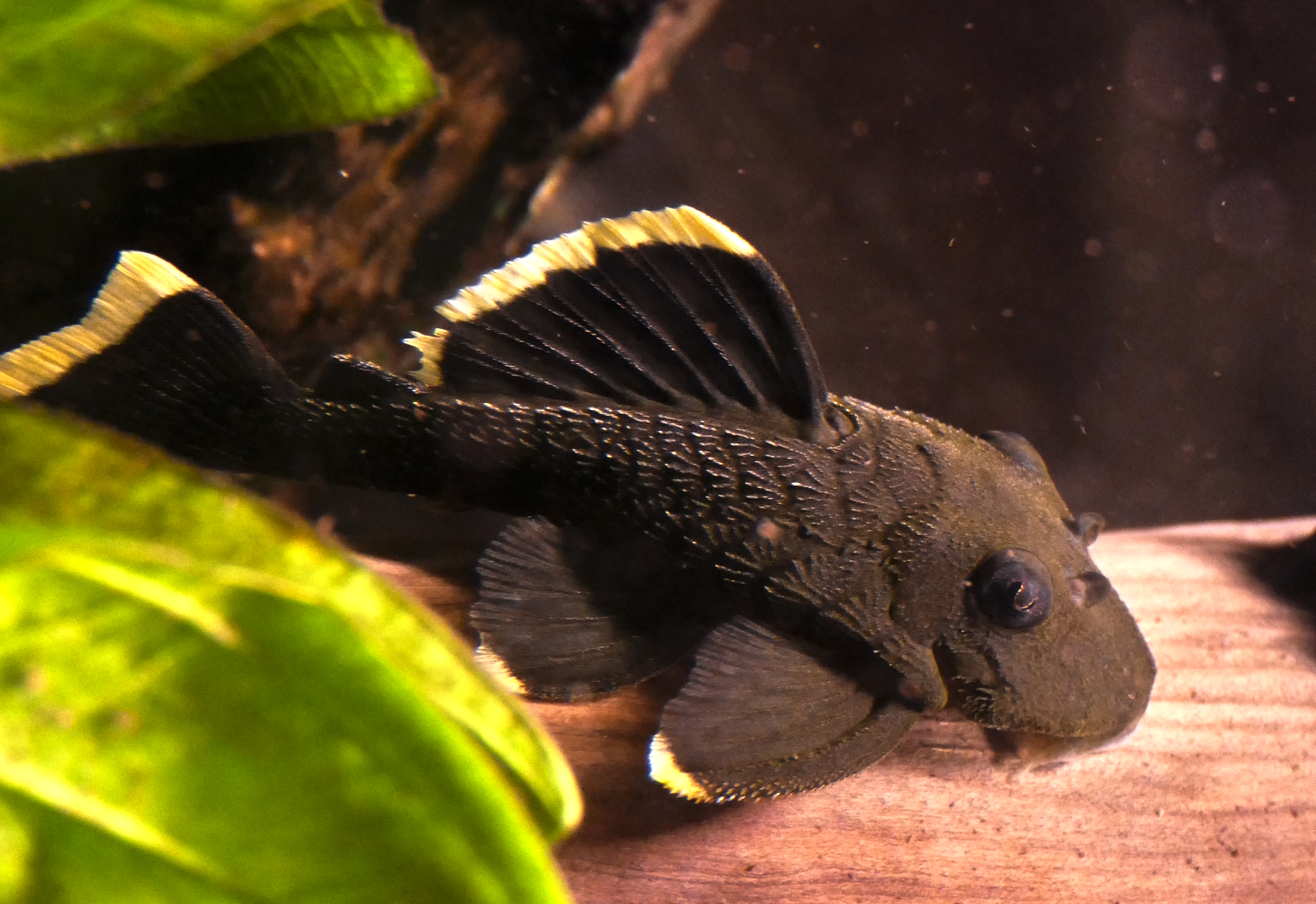

Conservation status
- Least Concern (IUCN 3.1)

Scientific classification
- Kingdom: Animalia
- Phylum: Chordata
- Class: Actinopterygii
- Order: Siluriformes
- Family: Loricariidae
- Genus: Baryancistrus
- Species: B. chrysolomus

Binomial name
- Baryancistrus chrysolomus Rapp Py-Daniel, Zuanon & R. R. de Oliveira, 2011

= Baryancistrus chrysolomus =

Species of catfish

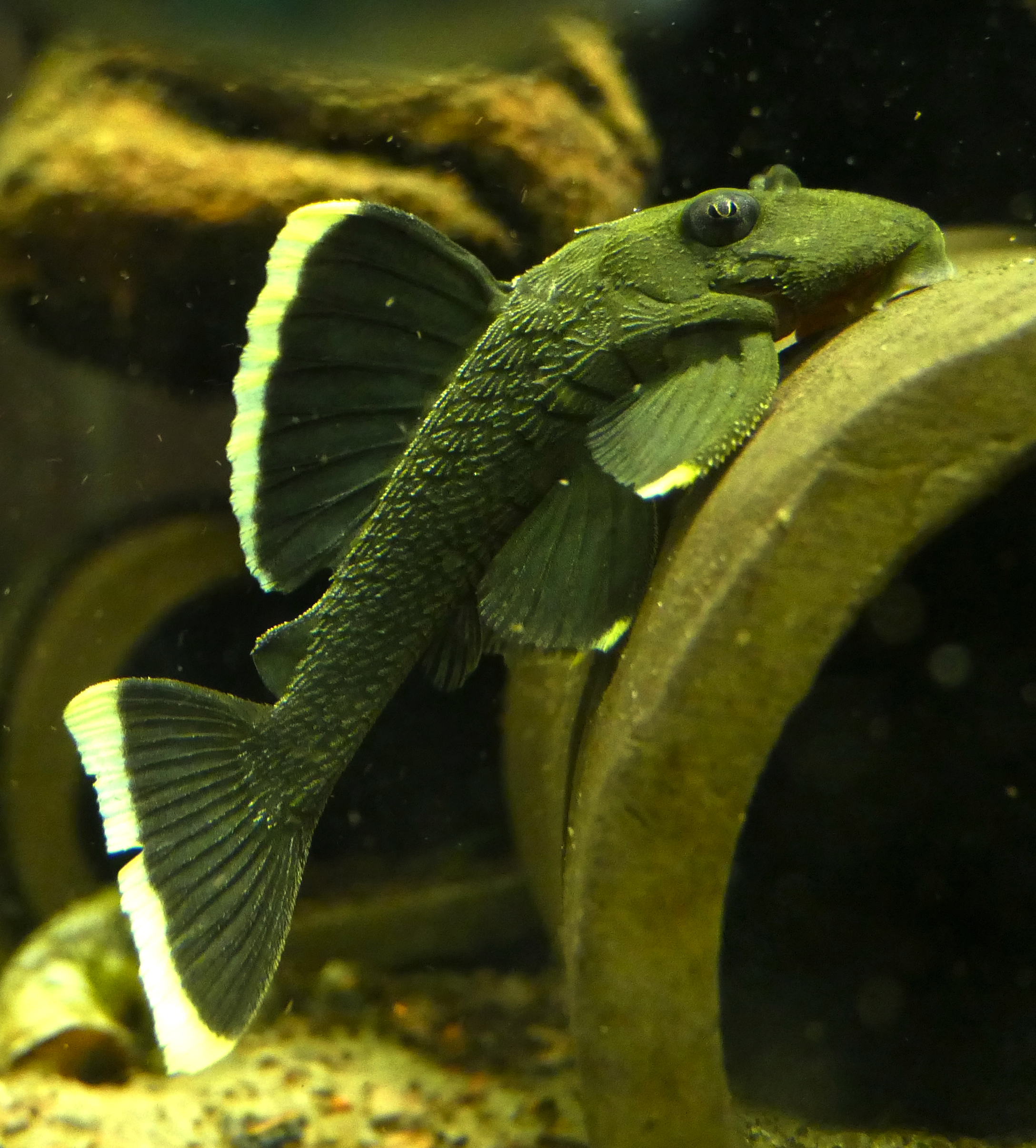
A specimen of B. chrysolomus in an aquarium

Baryancistrus chrysolomusis a species of freshwater ray-finned fish belonging to the family Loricariidae, the suckermouth armoured catfishes, and the subfamily Hypostominae, the suckermouth catfishes. This species is endemic to the Xingu River basin in Brazil. Adults of the species are most frequently found under flat rocks on the river bottom in places with fine sediments, whereas juveniles are found under rocks in marginal areas near river banks. The species reaches 29.6 cm (11.7 in) in total length and feeds on the diatoms and invertebrate larvae associated with fine sediments such as sand. It is present in the aquarium trade, where it is referred to as the mango pleco or by its L-number, L-047.
