= Baryancistrus beggini =

Conservation status
- Vulnerable (IUCN 3.1)

Scientific classification
- Kingdom: Animalia
- Phylum: Chordata
- Class: Actinopterygii
- Order: Siluriformes
- Family: Loricariidae
- Genus: Baryancistrus
- Species: B. beggini

Binomial name
- Baryancistrus beggini Lujan, Arce & Armbruster, 2009

Species of catfish

Baryancistrus beggini, the blue panaque, is a species of freshwater ray-finned fish belonging to the family Loricariidae, the suckermouth armoured catfishes, and the subfamily Hypostominae, the suckermouth catfishes. It is found in Venezuela and Colombia, where it can be found in areas with boulders or interstices of granitic bedrock in exposed portions of the Guiana Shield. It reaches 8.1 cm (3.2 in) in standard length.

== Etymology ==
In the article where this species is described, the authors mention that the specific epithet refers to Chris D. Beggin. He owns a fish and reptile retail shop in Nashville, USA, and is honored due to his financial support of the authors' research, ethical ornamental-fish business practices, and influence on the professional development of the first author, Nathan K. Lujan.

== Diet ==
It is reported to feed on periphyton and associated microfauna abundant on the surfaces and undersides of rocks in its habitat.

== Human interactions ==
This species can be found in the aquarium trade, where it is sometimes known by its L-number, which is L-239.
