= Hemiancistrus punctulatus =

Conservation status
- Least Concern (IUCN 3.1)

Scientific classification
- Kingdom: Animalia
- Phylum: Chordata
- Class: Actinopterygii
- Order: Siluriformes
- Family: Loricariidae
- Genus: Hemiancistrus
- Species: H. punctulatus

Binomial name
- Hemiancistrus punctulatus A. R. Cardoso & L. R. Malabarba, 1999

Species of catfish

Hemiancistrus punctulatus is a species of freshwater ray-finned fish belonging to the family Loricariidae, the suckermouth armoured catfishes, and the subfamily Hypostominae, the suckermouth catfishes. This catfish is endemic to Brazil where it occurs in the drainage bbasin of the Lagoa dos Patos state of Rio Grande do Sul. H. punctulatus reaches a standard length of 19 cm (7.5 in).
