= Pseudancistrus genisetiger =

Conservation status
- Least Concern (IUCN 3.1)

Scientific classification
- Kingdom: Animalia
- Phylum: Chordata
- Class: Actinopterygii
- Division: Teleostei
- Order: Siluriformes
- Family: Loricariidae
- Genus: Pseudancistrus
- Species: P. genisetiger

Binomial name
- Pseudancistrus genisetiger Fowler, 1941

Synonyms
- Lasiancistrus genisetiger (Fowler, 1941); Lithoxancistrus genisetiger (Fowler, 1941)

Species of catfish

Pseudancistrus genisetiger is a species of freshwater ray-finned fish belonging to the family Loricariidae, the suckermouth armoured catfishes, and the subfamily Hypostominae, the suckermouth catfishes. This catfish is found in South America, where it occurs in the Jaguaribe River in Ceará. The species reaches a total length of 10.3 cm (4.1 in).
