= Hemiancistrus meizospilos =

Conservation status
- Least Concern (IUCN 3.1)

Scientific classification
- Kingdom: Animalia
- Phylum: Chordata
- Class: Actinopterygii
- Order: Siluriformes
- Family: Loricariidae
- Genus: Hemiancistrus
- Species: H. meizospilos

Binomial name
- Hemiancistrus meizospilos A. R. Cardoso & J. F. P. da Silva, 2004

Species of catfish

Hemiancistrus meizospilos is a species of freshwater ray-finned fish belonging to the family Loricariidae, the suckermouth armoured catfishes, and the subfamily Hypostominae, the suckermouth catfishes. This catfish is endemic to Brazil where it occurs in the upper and middle basin of the Uruguay River in the states of Santa Catarina and Rio Grande do Sul. This species has small pale dots on the fins, and on the sides and back which distinguish it from most other similar species. H. meizospilos reaches a standard length of 14.9 cm (5.9 in).
