= Pseudancistrus nigrescens =

Conservation status
- Least Concern (IUCN 3.1)

Scientific classification
- Kingdom: Animalia
- Phylum: Chordata
- Class: Actinopterygii
- Division: Teleostei
- Order: Siluriformes
- Family: Loricariidae
- Genus: Pseudancistrus
- Species: P. nigrescens

Binomial name
- Pseudancistrus nigrescens C. H. Eigenmann, 1912

Species of catfish

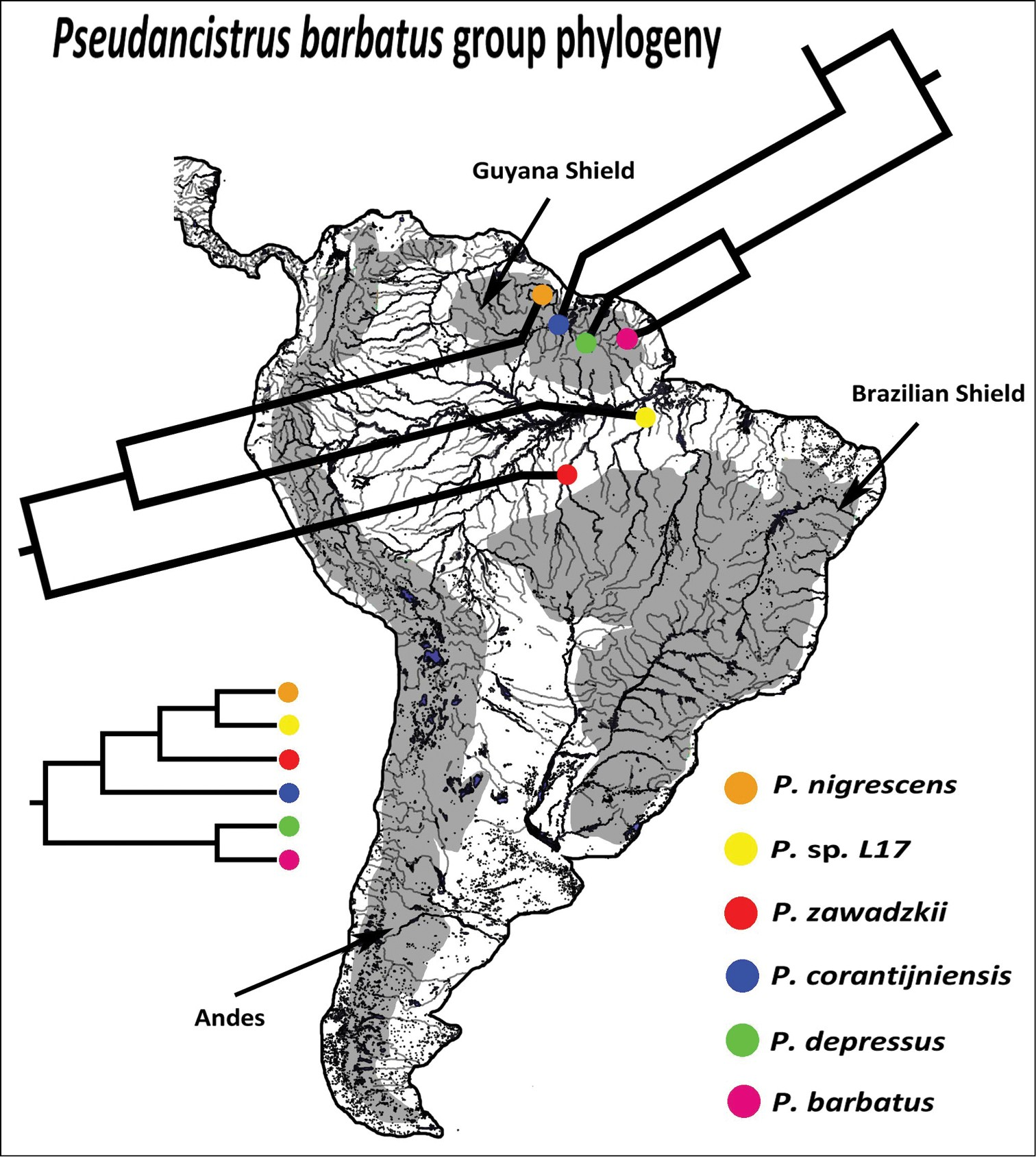
Distribution of several Pseudancistrus species, with P. nigrescens shown in orange.

Pseudancistrus nigrescens is a species of freshwater ray-finned fish belonging to the family Loricariidae, the suckermouth armoured catfishes, and the subfamily Hypostominae, the suckermouth catfishes. The distribution of this species has not been resolved, but it apparemtly occurs in the middle and lower Essequibo River and the Cuyunui River and maybe into the Takutu, in Venezuela, Guyana and Brazil. The species reaches 18.2 cm (7.2 inches) in total length.

P. nigrescens sometimes appears in the aquarium trade, where it is typically referred to either as the headspotted stream pleco or by its associated L-number, which is L-299.
