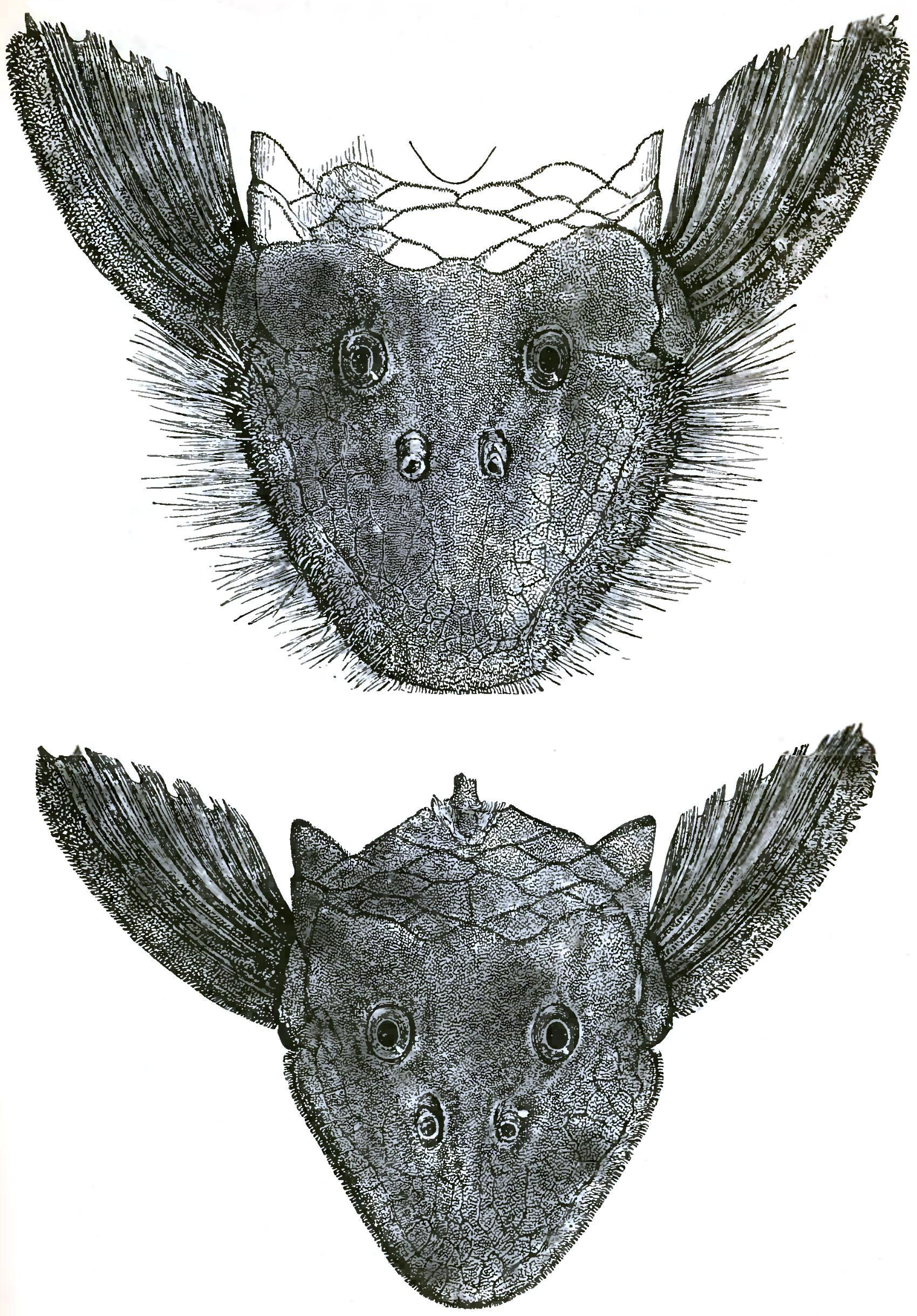
- Pseudancistrus barbatus

Scientific classification
- Kingdom: Animalia
- Phylum: Chordata
- Class: Actinopterygii
- Division: Teleostei
- Order: Siluriformes
- Family: Loricariidae
- Subfamily: Hypostominae
- Genus: Pseudancistrus; Bleeker, 1862

Type species
- Hypostomus barbatus Valenciennes, 1840

= Pseudancistrus =

Genus of fishes

Pseudancistrus is a genus of freshwater ray-finned fishes belonging to the family Loricariidae, the suckermouth armored catfishes, and the subfamily Hypostominae, the suckermouth catfishes. The catfishes in this genus are found in South America.

== Taxonomy ==
Pseudancistrus was first proposed as a genus in 1862 by the Dutch physician, herpetologist and ichthyologist Pieter Bleeker, with Hypostomus barbatus designated as its type species. H. barbatus was first formally described in 1840 by Achille Valenciennes, with its type locality given as La Mana River in French Guiana. The genus was redescribed in 2004 by Jonathan W. Armbruster. Some authorities regard this genus as being within the tribe Ancistrini of the subfamily Hypostominae, but Eschmeyer's Catalog of Fishes does not recognise tribes within the subfamily Hypostominae.

Within the genus there is what is called the P. barbatus group. This group comprises Guyanese derived Pseudancistrus, bearing hypertrophied odontodes along the snout and nonevertible cheek plates. It includes the five species P. barbatus, P. corantijniensis, P. depressus, P. nigrescens, and P. zawadzkii.

== Species ==
Pseudancistrus contains the following valid species:

- Pseudancistrus asurini G. S. C. Silva, Roxo & Oliveira, 2015
- Pseudancistrus barbatus (Valenciennes, 1840) (Bearded catfish)
- Pseudancistrus coquenani (Steindachner, 1915)
- Pseudancistrus corantijniensis de Chambrier & Montoya-Burgos, 2008
- Pseudancistrus depressus (Günther, 1868)
- Pseudancistrus genisetiger (Fowler, 1941)
- Pseudancistrus guentheri (Regan, 1904)
- Pseudancistrus kayabi G. S. C. Silva, Roxo & Oliveira, 2015
- Pseudancistrus kwinti Willink, Mol & Chernoff, 2010
- Pseudancistrus megacephalus (Günther, 1868)
- Pseudancistrus nigrescens C. H. Eigenmann, 1912
- Pseudancistrus papariae Fowler, 1941
- Pseudancistrus reus Armbruster & Taphorn, 2008
- Pseudancistrus zawadzkii G. S. C. Silva, Roxo, Britzke & Oliveira, 2014

== Distribution and habitat ==
Pseudancistrus species are found around the Guiana Shield in the Guyanas, Venezuela, and Brazil. They are also found in northeastern Brazil in the Rio Jaguaribe and Rio Grande do Norte. They are associated with swift flowing water over gravel, cobble, and boulders.

== Description ==
There is a considerable variation in size within this genus, up to over 20 cm in standard length, in the case of species such as P. pectegenitor. Most species are not able to evert their cheek plates. In some species, odontodes on the snout may sometimes be extremely hypertrophied. Most species are dark gray, with lighter colouration on the abdomen. In some species, there are light-colored spots or blotches on the sides. Usually, the fins are similarly colored, but in some species there are bands on the caudal fin or an orange or red edging to the dorsal fin and caudal fin.
