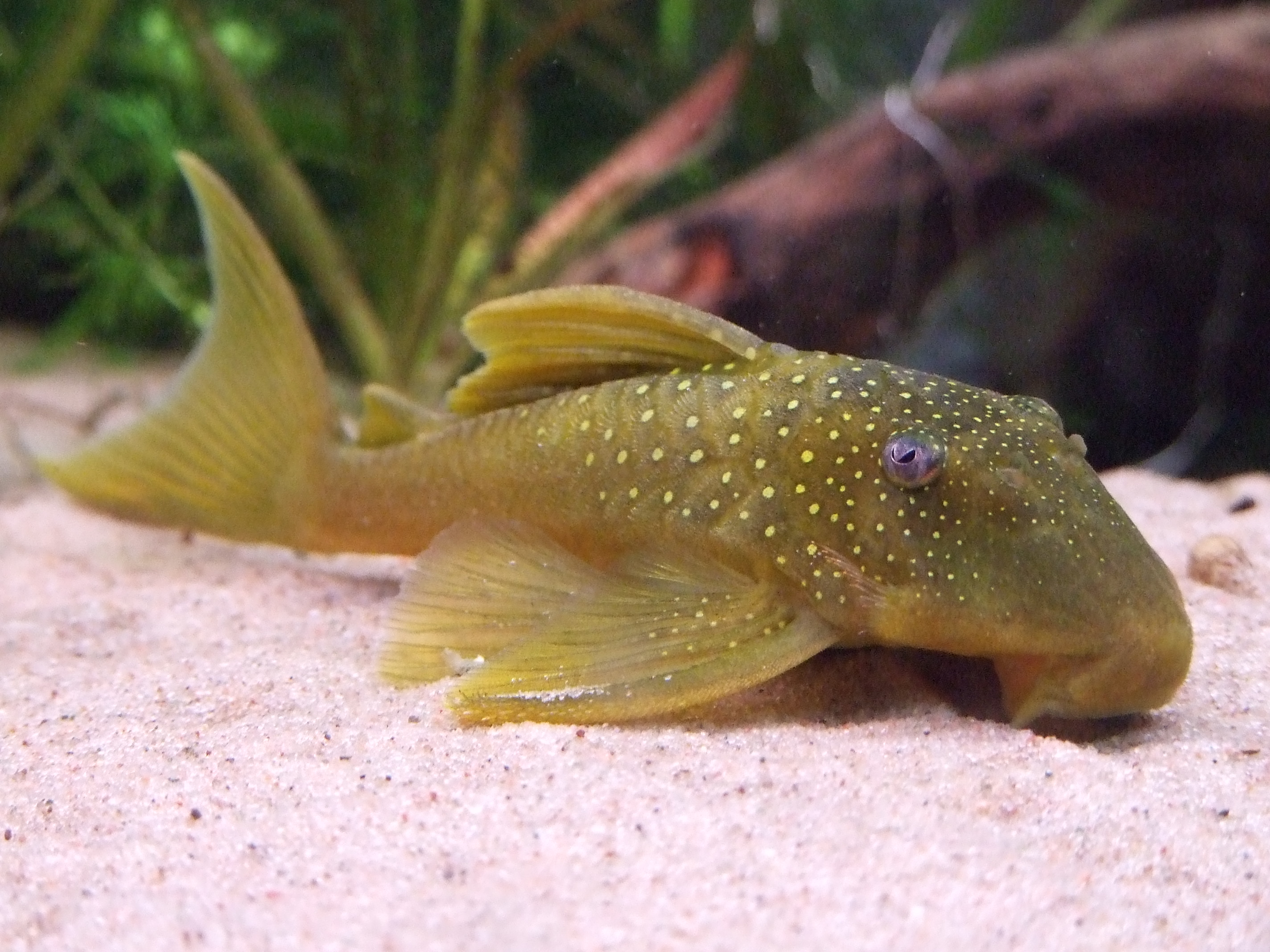

Conservation status
- Near Threatened (IUCN 3.1)

Scientific classification
- Kingdom: Animalia
- Phylum: Chordata
- Class: Actinopterygii
- Order: Siluriformes
- Family: Loricariidae
- Genus: Baryancistrus
- Species: B. demantoides

Binomial name
- Baryancistrus demantoides Werneke, Sabaj Pérez, Lujan & Armbruster, 2005

= Baryancistrus demantoides =

Species of fish

Baryancistrus demantoides is a species of freshwater ray-finned fish belonging to the family Loricariidae, the suckermouth armoured catfishes, and the subfamily Hypostominae, the suckermouth catfishes. This catfish is endemic to Venezuela. It reaches a standard length of 15.1 cm (5.9 in). It lives around granite rocks in flowing water, in the upper parts of Orinoco River.

The colour is green-brown with yellow spots on the head and parts of the body. The dorsal fin is connected to the adipose fin, a feature that distinguishes this species from the rest of the Ancistrini, except Baryancistrus niveatus, Parancistrus and Spectracanthicus.

Baryancistrus demantoides is one of two species referred to by the L-number L-200. The other is Hemiancistrus subviridis, which resembles B. demantoides in appearance, and it is this visual similarity that likely historically caused the two to be thought of as the same species, or at least closely related ones, leading them to share an L-number.
