= Pseudancistrus kayabi =

Scientific classification
- Kingdom: Animalia
- Phylum: Chordata
- Class: Actinopterygii
- Division: Teleostei
- Order: Siluriformes
- Family: Loricariidae
- Genus: Pseudancistrus
- Species: P. kayabi

Binomial name
- Pseudancistrus kayabi Silva, Roxo & de Oliveira, 2015

Species of fish

Pseudancistrus kayabi a species of freshwater ray-finned fish belonging to the family Loricariidae, the suckermouth armoured catfishes, and the subfamily Hypostominae, the suckermouth catfishes. This catfish is found in South America, where it occurs in the Teles Pires River, which is part of the Tapajós basin in the Brazilian state of Mato Grosso. The species reaches a standard length of 8.5 cm (3.3 in).

== Etymology ==
Its specific epithet, kayabi, refers to the Kayabí people who historically inhabited the region surrounding the Teles Pires, Arinos, and Dos Peixes river basins in Mato Grosso. It was described in 2015 by Gabriel S. C. Silva, Fábio F. Roxo, and Claudio Oliveira alongside the related species Pseudancistrus asurini from the Xingu River basin.
