= Pseudancistrus guentheri =

Conservation status
- Data Deficient (IUCN 3.1)

Scientific classification
- Kingdom: Animalia
- Phylum: Chordata
- Class: Actinopterygii
- Division: Teleostei
- Order: Siluriformes
- Family: Loricariidae
- Genus: Pseudancistrus
- Species: P. guentheri

Binomial name
- Pseudancistrus guentheri Regan, 1941

Synonyms
- Ancistrus guentheri Regan, 1904

Species of catfish

Pseudancistrus guentheri is a species of freshwater ray-finned fish belonging to the family Loricariidae, the suckermouth armoured catfishes, and the subfamily Hypostominae, the suckermouth catfishes. This catfish is found in South America, where it is known only from its holotype, which was collected from an unknown locality in British Guiana by Robert Hermann Schomburgk in the early 19th century. The holotype has a total length of 12.5 cm (4.9 in). The specific name honours the German-born British herpetologist and ichthyologist Albert Günther.
