= Pseudancistrus reus =

Conservation status
- Data Deficient (IUCN 3.1)

Scientific classification
- Kingdom: Animalia
- Phylum: Chordata
- Class: Actinopterygii
- Division: Teleostei
- Order: Siluriformes
- Family: Loricariidae
- Genus: Pseudancistrus
- Species: P. reus

Binomial name
- Pseudancistrus reus Armbruster & Taphorn, 2008

Species of catfish in the family Loricariidae

Pseudancistrus reus is a species of freshwater ray-finned fish belonging to the family Loricariidae, the suckermouth armoured catfishes, and the subfamily Hypostominae, the suckermouth catfishes. This catfish is known only from its type locality, the Caroní River in Venezuela. It is typically found in presumably blackwater environments (described as "tea-colored") with low conductivity and a moderate current. This species reaches a standard length of 7.7 cm (3.0 in). The specific name, reus, is derived from Latin and means "accused" or "arraigned" in court as in a defendant and prisoner, alluding to the species' barred patterning which resembles a stereotypical prison uniform.
