= Pseudancistrus depressus =

Conservation status
- Least Concern (IUCN 3.1)

Scientific classification
- Kingdom: Animalia
- Phylum: Chordata
- Class: Actinopterygii
- Division: Teleostei
- Order: Siluriformes
- Family: Loricariidae
- Genus: Pseudancistrus
- Species: P. depressus

Binomial name
- Pseudancistrus depressus (Günther, 1868)

Synonyms
- Chaetostomus depressus Günther, 1868

Species of catfish

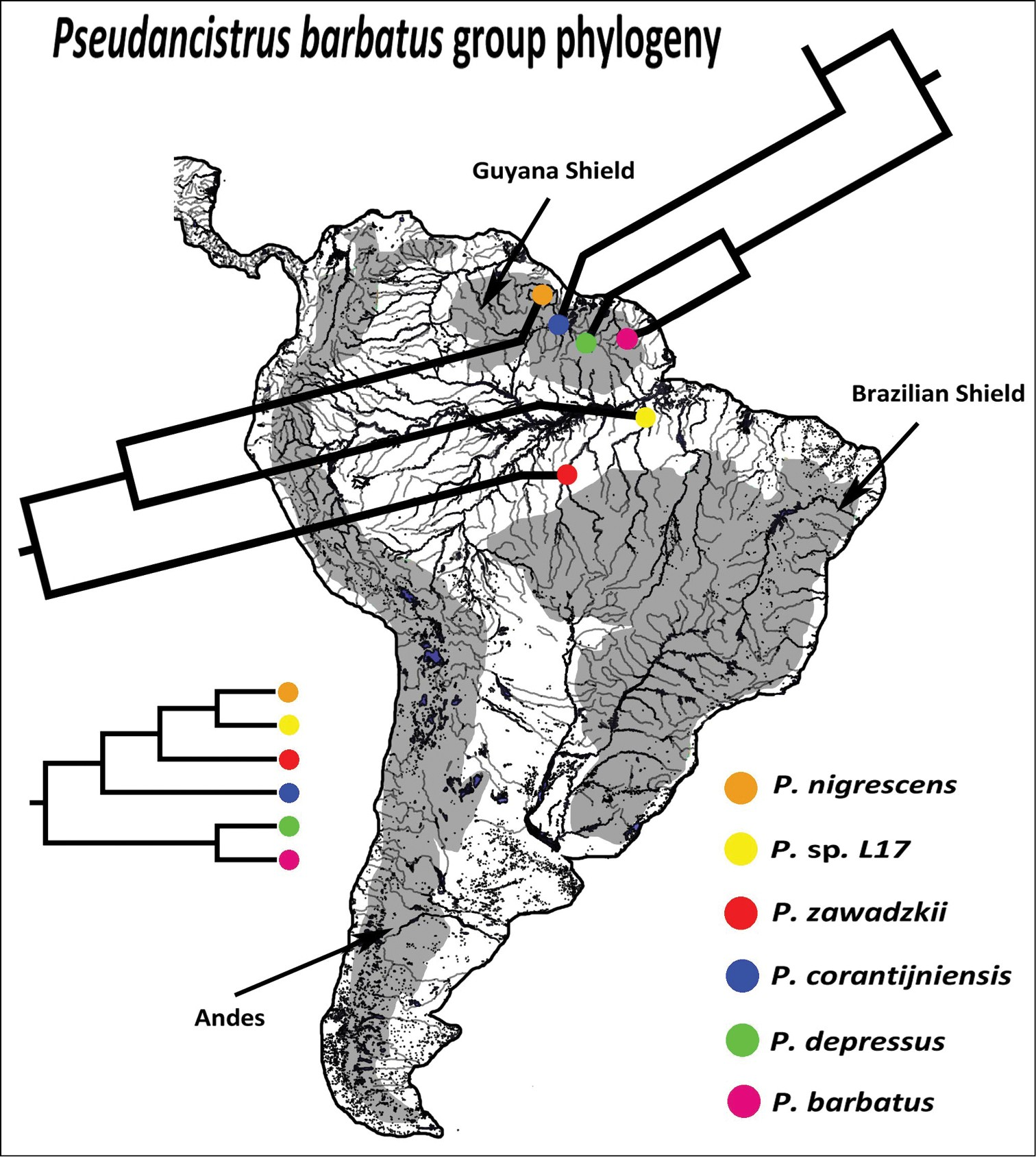
Distribution of several Pseudancistrus species, with P. depressus shown in green.

Pseudancistrus depressus is a species of freshwater ray-finned fish belonging to the family Loricariidae, the suckermouth armoured catfishes, and the subfamily Hypostominae, the suckermouth catfishes. This catfish is found in South America, where it occurs in the Suriname and the Coppename rivers, in Suriname. The species reaches a total length of 13 cm (5.1 in).
