= Hemiancistrus landoni =

Conservation status
- Least Concern (IUCN 3.1)

Scientific classification
- Kingdom: Animalia
- Phylum: Chordata
- Class: Actinopterygii
- Order: Siluriformes
- Family: Loricariidae
- Genus: Hemiancistrus
- Species: H. landoni

Binomial name
- Hemiancistrus landoni Eigenmann, 1916

Synonyms
- Hemiancistrus hammarlundi Rendahl, 1937

Species of catfish

Hemiancistrus landoni is a species of freshwater ray-finned fish belonging to the family Loricariidae, the suckermouth armoured catfishes, and the subfamily Hypostominae, the suckermouth catfishes. This catfish is endemic to Ecuador where it is found in the Guayas, Arenillas, Puyango and Zaracay rivers in the provinces of Manabi, Los Rios, Guayas and El Oro. This species reaches a total length of 25 cm (9.8 in). The specific name honours the American businessman and philanthropist Hugh McKennan Landon, who provided some of the funding for the expedition the holotype was collected on.
