= Hypostomus gymnorhynchus =

Scientific classification
- Kingdom: Animalia
- Phylum: Chordata
- Class: Actinopterygii
- Order: Siluriformes
- Family: Loricariidae
- Genus: Hypostomus
- Species: H. gymnorhynchus

Binomial name
- Hypostomus gymnorhynchus (Norman, 1926)

Synonyms
- Plecostomus gymnorhynchus

Species of catfish

Hypostomus gymnorhynchus is a species of catfish in the family Loricariidae. It is native to South America, where it occurs in coastal drainages of French Guiana, ranging from the Oyapock to the Maroni basin. It is a rheophilic species that occurs in shallow, sunny rapids with strong currents and rocky substrates. While the species can reach 26.6 cm (10.5 inches) in standard length, it rarely exceeds 20 cm (7.9 inches).

Although Hypostomus gymnorhynchus sometimes appears in the aquarium trade, it is not reported to have any common names or associated L-numbers.
