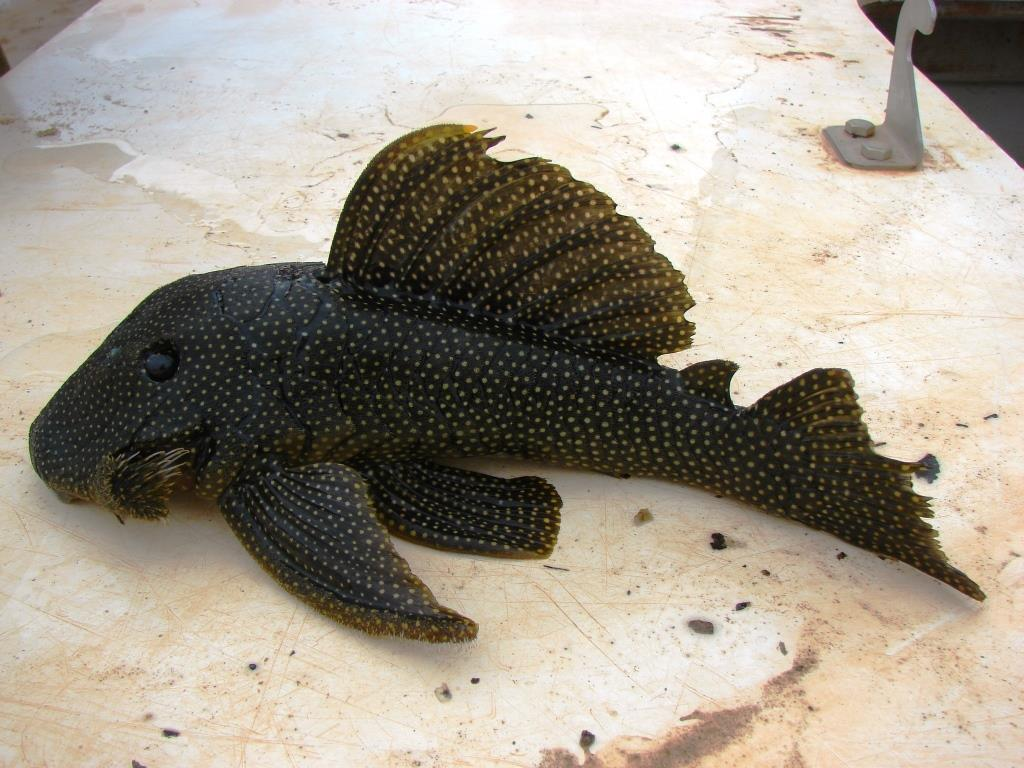

Conservation status
- Vulnerable (IUCN 3.1)

Scientific classification
- Kingdom: Animalia
- Phylum: Chordata
- Class: Actinopterygii
- Order: Siluriformes
- Family: Loricariidae
- Genus: Baryancistrus
- Species: B. niveatus

Binomial name
- Baryancistrus niveatus (Castelnau, 1855)

Synonyms
- Hypostomus niveatus Castelnau, 1885; Parancistrus niveatus (Castelnau, 1885)

= Baryancistrus niveatus =

Species of catfish

Baryancistrus niveatus is a species of freshwater ray-finned fish belonging to the family Loricariidae, the suckermouth armoured catfishes, and the subfamily Hypostominae, the suckermouth catfishes. This catfish is endemic to Brazil where it has been recorded from the Tucuruí regio to Serra da Mesa, on the Tocantins River, and in the lower Araguaia River as far as Araguaina, in the Brazilian states of Goiás, Pará and Tocantins. Claims of this species from the Xingu and Tapajós river basins are probably erroneous and represent one, or more, undescribed species. This species is among the largest members of the genus Baryancistrus, reaching 34 cm (13.4 inches) in total length. It sometimes appears in the aquarium trade, where it is known by its L-number, L-026.

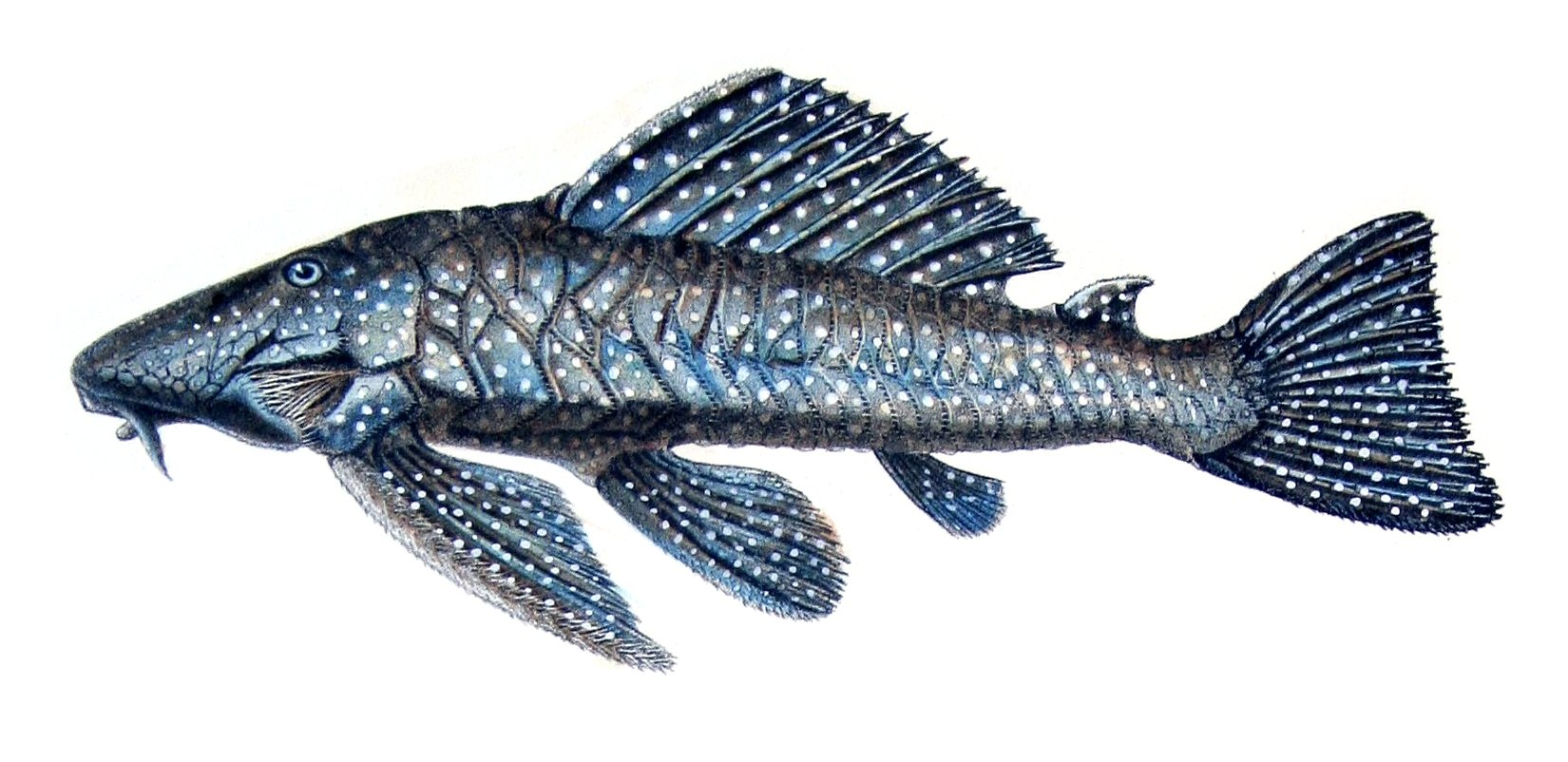
An illustration of Baryancistrus niveatus.
