= Baryancistrus hadrostomus =

Scientific classification
- Kingdom: Animalia
- Phylum: Chordata
- Class: Actinopterygii
- Order: Siluriformes
- Family: Loricariidae
- Genus: Baryancistrus
- Species: B. hadrostomus

Binomial name
- Baryancistrus hadrostomus R. R. de Oliveira, Rapp Py-Daniel & Oyakawa, 2019

Species of catfish

Baryancistrus hadrostomus, is a species of freshwater ray-finned fish belonging to the family Loricariidae, the suckermouth armoured catfishes, and the subfamily Hypostominae, the suckermouth catfishes. This catfish was first formally described in 2019 by Renildo Ribeiro de Oliveira, Lucia Helena Rapp Py-Daniel and Osvaldo Takeshi Oyakawa with its type locality given as the first waterfall of the Iratapuru River, Laranjal do Jari, in the Brazilian state of Amapá, at 0°33'50.4"S, 52°34'42.4"W. This species is found in the basin of the Jari River in northern Brazil. This species is told apart from all other Baryancistrus species by having a grey to black coloured body covered by small and widely spaced white dots.
