= Pseudancistrus papariae =

Scientific classification
- Kingdom: Animalia
- Phylum: Chordata
- Class: Actinopterygii
- Division: Teleostei
- Order: Siluriformes
- Family: Loricariidae
- Genus: Pseudancistrus
- Species: P. papariae

Binomial name
- Pseudancistrus papariae Fowler, 1941

Synonyms
- Lasiancistrus papariae (Fowler, 1941); Lithoxancistrus papariae (Fowler, 1941)

Species of catfish

Pseudancistrus papariae is a species of freshwater ray-finned fish belonging to the family Loricariidae, the suckermouth armoured catfishes, and the subfamily Hypostominae, the suckermouth catfishes. This catfish occurs in Lake Papari and the Jaguaribe River basin in Brazil. The species reaches a standard length of 15.3 cm (6.0 in).
