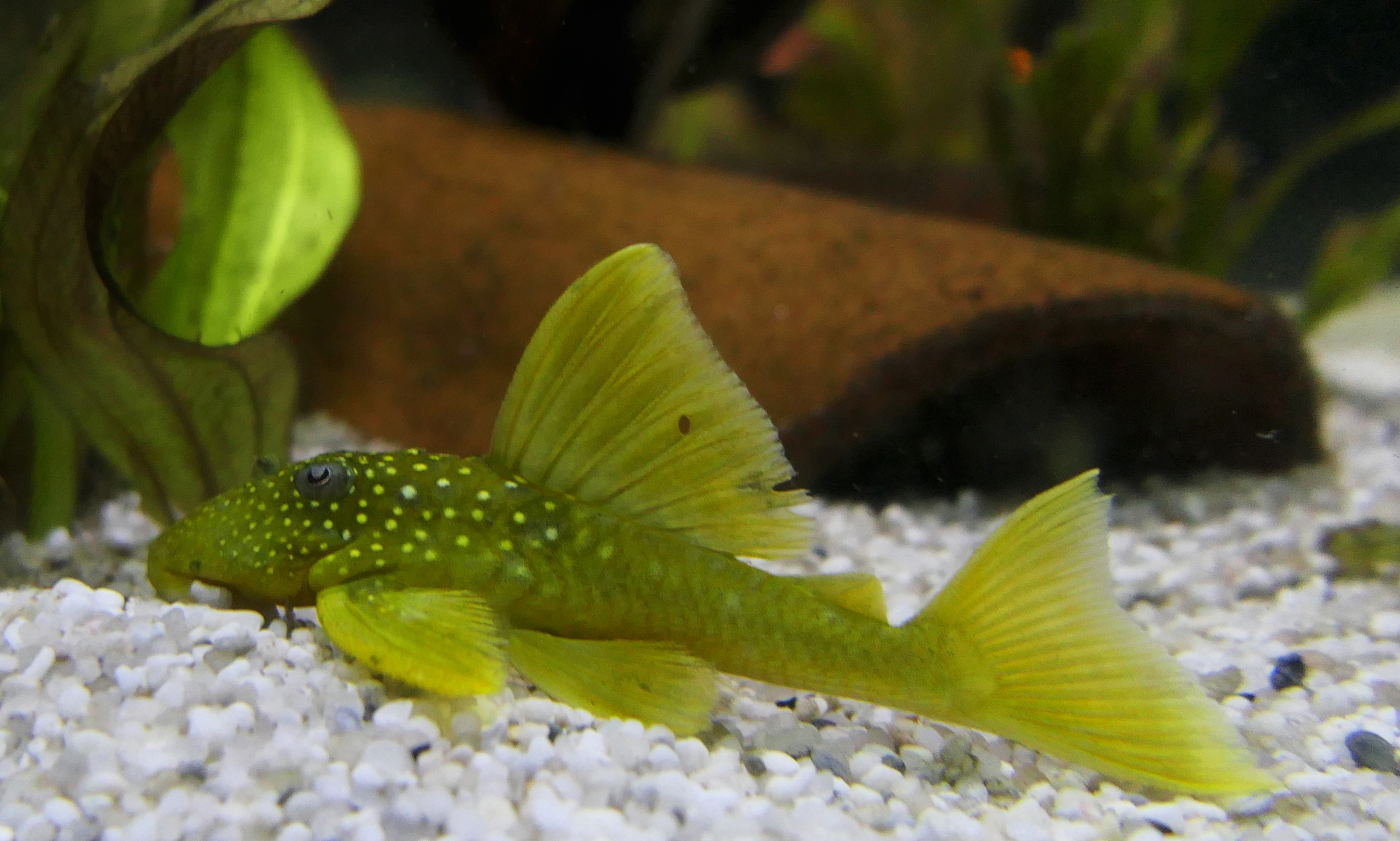
- Hemiancistrus subviridis

Scientific classification
- Kingdom: Animalia
- Phylum: Chordata
- Class: Actinopterygii
- Division: Teleostei
- Order: Siluriformes
- Family: Loricariidae
- Subfamily: Hypostominae
- Genus: Hemiancistrus; Bleeker, 1862

Type species
- Ancistrus medians Kner, 1854

= Hemiancistrus =

Genus of fishes

Hemiancistrus is a genus of freshwater ray-finned fish belonging to the family Loricariidae, the suckermouth armoured catfishes, and the subfamily Hypostominae, the suckermouth catfishes. These catfishes are found in South America. The taxonomy of this genus is complex and unclear, and major work has to be done. Many of these fish are popular aquarium fish.

== Taxonomy ==
Hemiancistrus was first proposed as a monospecific genus in 1862 by the Dutch physician, herpetologist and ichthyologist Pieter Bleeker with Ancistrus medians designated as its type species, as well as being its only species. A. medians was first formally described in 1854 by Rudolf Kner but the holotype has been lost, a neotype was designated in 2012 by Sonia Fisch-Muller et al, with its type locality given as Grand Inini River, "Saut S", at 3°36'19"N, 53°48'25"W, in the Maroni River basin of Suriname. Some authorities regard this genus as being within the tribe Ancistrini of the subfamily Hypostominae, but Eschmeyer's Catalog of Fishes does not recognise tribes within the subfamily Hypostominae. This genus has long been used as a "dump" for Loricariid species; fish with unclear relationships have been classified as members of this genus. As such, this taxon is not monophyletic. At this point, many undescribed species remain.

This genus and the closely related Peckoltia may be synonymous, as neither genus is supported by synapomorphies. Hemiancistrus species differ from other members of the Panaque clade lacking the synapomorphies of the other genera and having the dentaries meeting at an angle greater than 120°; in Peckoltia species, the dentaries meet at less than 90° Generally, Peckoltia are considered to be those that have dorsal saddles and bands in the fins, while Heminancistrus have spots and uniform coloration.

What species belong to this genus has been unclear. Many newer species have been tentatively assigned to Hemiancistrus. Although the recently described H. micrommatos and H. spinosissimus have been considered synonyms of H. spilomma by Armbruster, they have more recently been considered valid. H. micrommatos, H. spinosissimus and H. spilomma are currently placed in the genus Ancistomus. Hemiancistrus medians is larger than most species that were left in Hemiancistrus, has well-developed keels (only present elsewhere in H. landoni), and a different body shape. The remainder of the taxa that do not have established genera that they can be placed in will be recognized as species groups in Hemiancistrus in single quotes until they can be examined further.

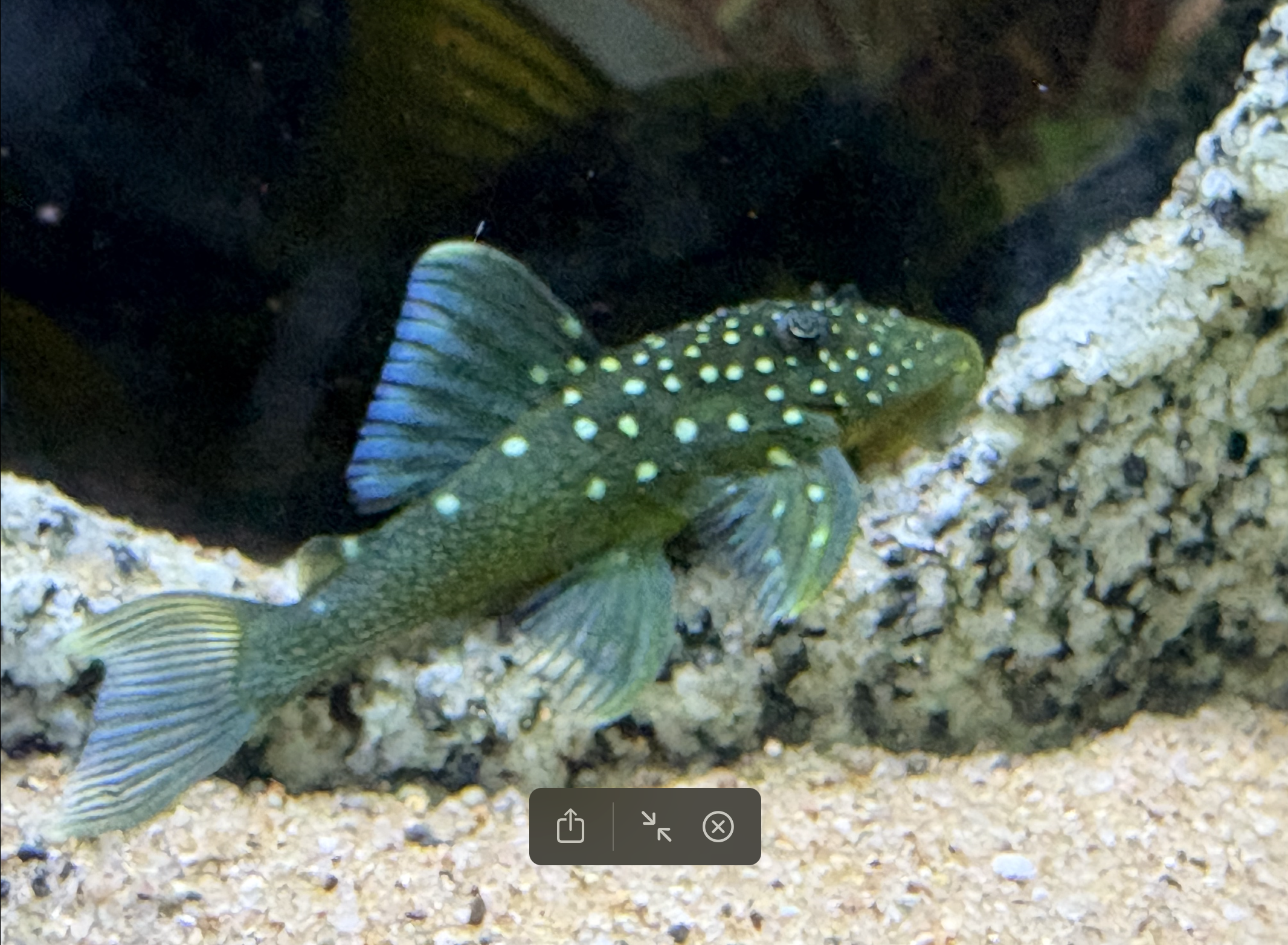
L128 Blue Phantom Pleco

== Species ==
Hemiancistrus contains teh following valid species:

- Hemiancistrus cerrado L. S. de Souza, M. R. S. de Melo, Chamon & Armbruster, 2008
- Hemiancistrus chlorostictus A. R. Cardoso & L. R. Malabarba, 1999
- Hemiancistrus fuliginosus A. R. Cardoso & L. R. Malabarba, 1999
- Hemiancistrus furtivus Provenzano & Barriga, 2017
- Hemiancistrus guahiborum Werneke, Armbruster, Lujan & Taphorn, 2005
- Hemiancistrus landoni C. H. Eigenmann, 1916
- Hemiancistrus medians Kner, 1854
- Hemiancistrus megalopteryx A. R. Cardoso, 2004
- Hemiancistrus meizospilos A. R. Cardoso & J. F. P. da Silva, 2004
- Hemiancistrus punctulatus A. R. Cardoso & L. R. Malabarba, 1999
- Hemiancistrus subviridis Werneke, Sabaj Pérez, Lujan & Armbruster, 2005
- Hemiancistrus votouro A. R. Cardoso & J. F. P. da Silva, 2004

== Distribution and habitat ==
Hemiancistrus species are mainly found in tropical and subtropical South America east of the Andes, but there is also species (H. landoni) in Pacific coast drainages of Colombia and Ecuador. The genus exhibits a large distribution area ranging from the Panama, in Central America, to southern Brazil. Many Hemiancistrus originate from the Guyanas, the Negro and Orinoco and the southern Amazonian tributaries. These fish prefer flowing water habitats of medium to large rivers.

== Appearance and anatomy ==
Hemiancistrus are members of the family Loricariidae, the armored suckermouth catfishes. As such, they have armor plating on their body instead of scales. Also, they have a suckermouth which they use to cling to rocks in their habitat. They have the characteristic Loricariid omega iris as well. Like many other catfish, Hemiancistrus have strong pectoral and dorsal fin spines that can be locked outwards as a defense.

Hemiancistrus species are rather small to medium-sized Loricariid species. The largest species of the genus, H. megalopteryx, reaches about 29 centimetres (11 in). These fish also tend to be spotted or uniform in coloration.

== In the aquarium ==
Hemiancistrus species are popular aquarium fish. Many species are relatively small and attractively colored. 'Hemiancistrus' subviridis is one such example, a bright green fish with yellow spots. However, H. guahiborum is only rarely imported; despite being common in its natural habitat, it is less attractive than H. subviridis, which occurs in the same area.
