= Baryancistrus longipinnis =

Conservation status
- Endangered (IUCN 3.1)

Scientific classification
- Kingdom: Animalia
- Phylum: Chordata
- Class: Actinopterygii
- Order: Siluriformes
- Family: Loricariidae
- Genus: Baryancistrus
- Species: B. longipinnis

Binomial name
- Baryancistrus longipinnis (Kindle, 1895)

Synonyms
- Hemiancistrus longipinnis Kindle, 1895; Parancistrus longipinnis (Kindle, 1865)

Species of catfish

Baryancistrus longipinnis, is a species of freshwater ray-finned fish belonging to the family Loricariidae, the suckermouth armoured catfishes, and the subfamily Hypostominae, the suckermouth catfishes. This catfish is endemic to Brazil where it is found in the basins of the Tocantins and Parauapebas Rivers in the Brazilian state of Pará. This species reaches a total length of 20 cm (7.9 in).
