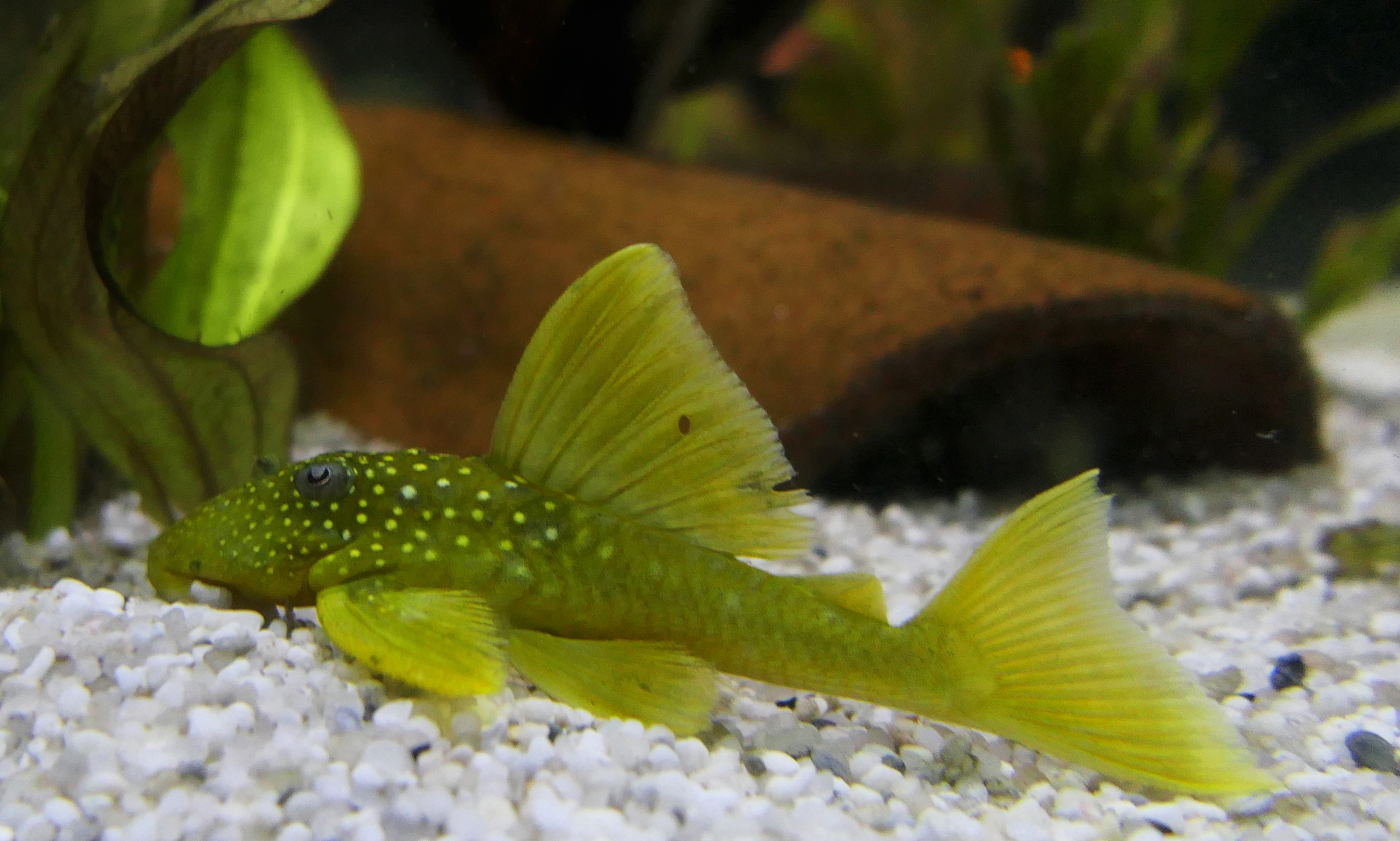

Conservation status
- Least Concern (IUCN 3.1)

Scientific classification
- Kingdom: Animalia
- Phylum: Chordata
- Class: Actinopterygii
- Order: Siluriformes
- Family: Loricariidae
- Genus: Hemiancistrus
- Species: H. subviridis

Binomial name
- Hemiancistrus subviridis Werneke, Sabaj Pérez, Lujan & Armbruster, 2005

= Hemiancistrus subviridis =

Species of fish

Hemiancistrus subviridis, is a species of freshwater ray-finned fish belonging to the family Loricariidae, the suckermouth armoured catfishes, and the subfamily Hypostominae, the suckermouth catfishes. This catfish is found in eastern Colombia and western Venezuela where it occurs in the upper Orinoco river system upstream of the Atures rapids to the Iguapo, Ventuari and Casiquiare Rivers. In these rivers it is found in the spaces between granite rocks, feeding on insects, algae, bryophytes and other types of plant matter. This species reaches a standard length of 15 cm (5.9 in).

Hemiancistrus subviridis is one of two species that is referred to by the L-number L-200 in the aquarium hobby. The other is Baryancistrus demantoides, which resembles H. subviridis in appearance, and it is this visual similarity that likely historically caused the two to be thought of as the same species, or at least closely related ones, leading them to share an L-number. It is also known as the green phantom pleco in the hobby.
