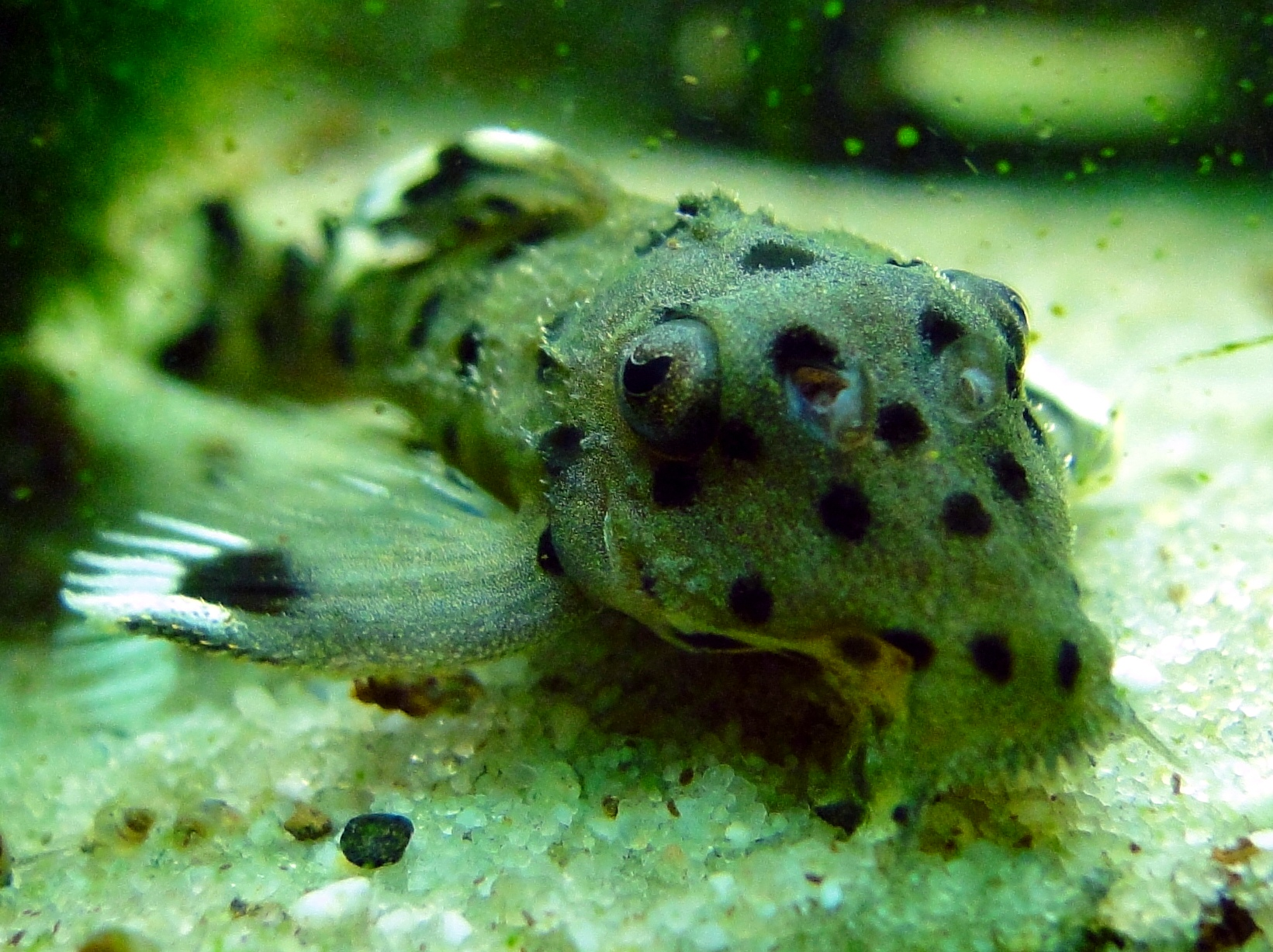

Conservation status
- Vulnerable (IUCN 3.1)

Scientific classification
- Kingdom: Animalia
- Phylum: Chordata
- Class: Actinopterygii
- Order: Siluriformes
- Family: Loricariidae
- Subfamily: Hypostominae
- Genus: Leporacanthicus
- Species: L. joselimai

Binomial name
- Leporacanthicus joselimai Isbrücker & Nijssen, 1989

= Leporacanthicus joselimai =

Species of fish

Leporacanthicus joselimai is a species of freshwater ray-finned fish belonging to the family Loricariidae, the suckermouth armoured catfishes, and the subfamily Hypostominae, the suckermouth catfishes. This catfish is endemic to Brazil where it is found in the Tapajós River basin in Pará. This species grows to a standard length of 9.8 cm (3.9 in).

== Etymology ==
The fish is named in honor of ichthyologist José Lima de Figueiredo (b. 1943), of the Museu de Zoologia da Universidade de São Paulo, who pointed the senior author's study to the genera now known as Leporacanthicus and Hopliancistrus.
