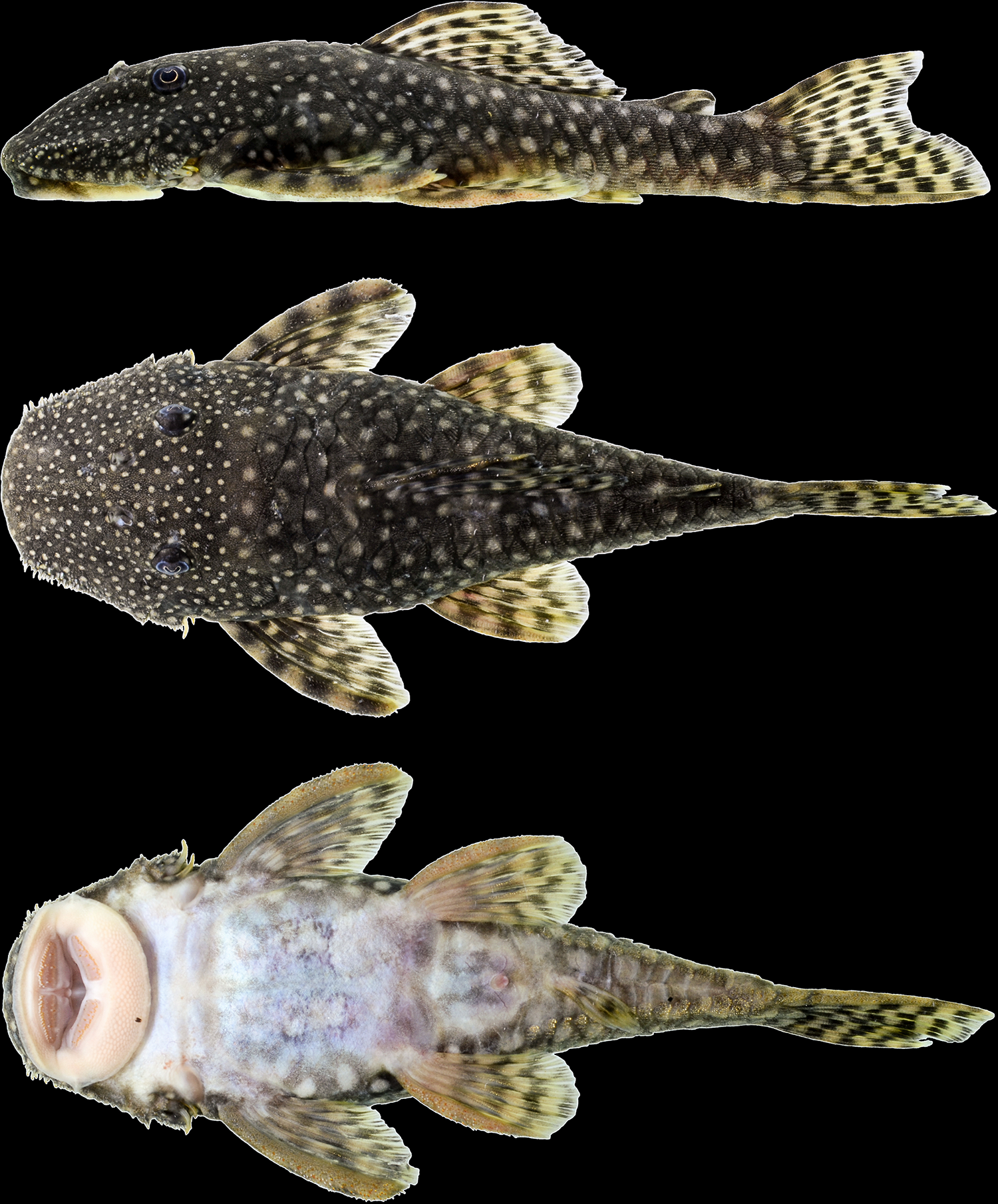

Conservation status
- Endangered (IUCN 3.1)

Scientific classification
- Kingdom: Animalia
- Phylum: Chordata
- Class: Actinopterygii
- Order: Siluriformes
- Family: Loricariidae
- Genus: Hopliancistrus
- Species: H. tricornis

Binomial name
- Hopliancistrus tricornis Isbrücker & Nijssen, 1989

= Hopliancistrus tricornis =

Genus of fishes

Hopliancistrus tricornis is a species of freshwater ray-finned fish belonging to the family Loricariidae, the suckermouth armoured catfishes, and the subfamily Hypostominae, the suckermouth catfishes. This species reaches a length of 10.4 centimetres (4.1 in) SL. It is endemic to Brazil and can be found in the Tapajós and Xingu River basins. This species appears similar to members of Lasiancistrus, however it lacks the synapomorphies and has five rows of plates on the caudal peduncle instead of three like those found in Lasiancistrus. It is characterized by three stout, strongly curved odontodes on either side of the head in males. H. tricornis is the type species of the genus Hopliancistrus. The International Union for Conservation of Nature have assessed this species as Endangered because half of its known range has been affected, or will be affected, by the construction of dams.
