= Leporacanthicus triactis =

Conservation status
- Least Concern (IUCN 3.1)

Scientific classification
- Kingdom: Animalia
- Phylum: Chordata
- Class: Actinopterygii
- Order: Siluriformes
- Family: Loricariidae
- Genus: Leporacanthicus
- Species: L. triactis

Binomial name
- Leporacanthicus triactis Isbrücker, Nijssen & Nico, 1992

Species of fish

Leporacanthicus triactis is a species of freshwater ray-finned fish belonging to the family Loricariidae, the suckermouth armoured catfishes, and the subfamily Hypostominae, the suckermouth catfishes. This catfish is found in the lower Ventuari River and in the Orinoco River basin in Colombia and Venezuela. This species grows to a standard length of 24.7 cm (9.7 in).

== Ecology ==
Leporacanthicus triactis has been found in deep holes in mud banks and spawns in caves.
