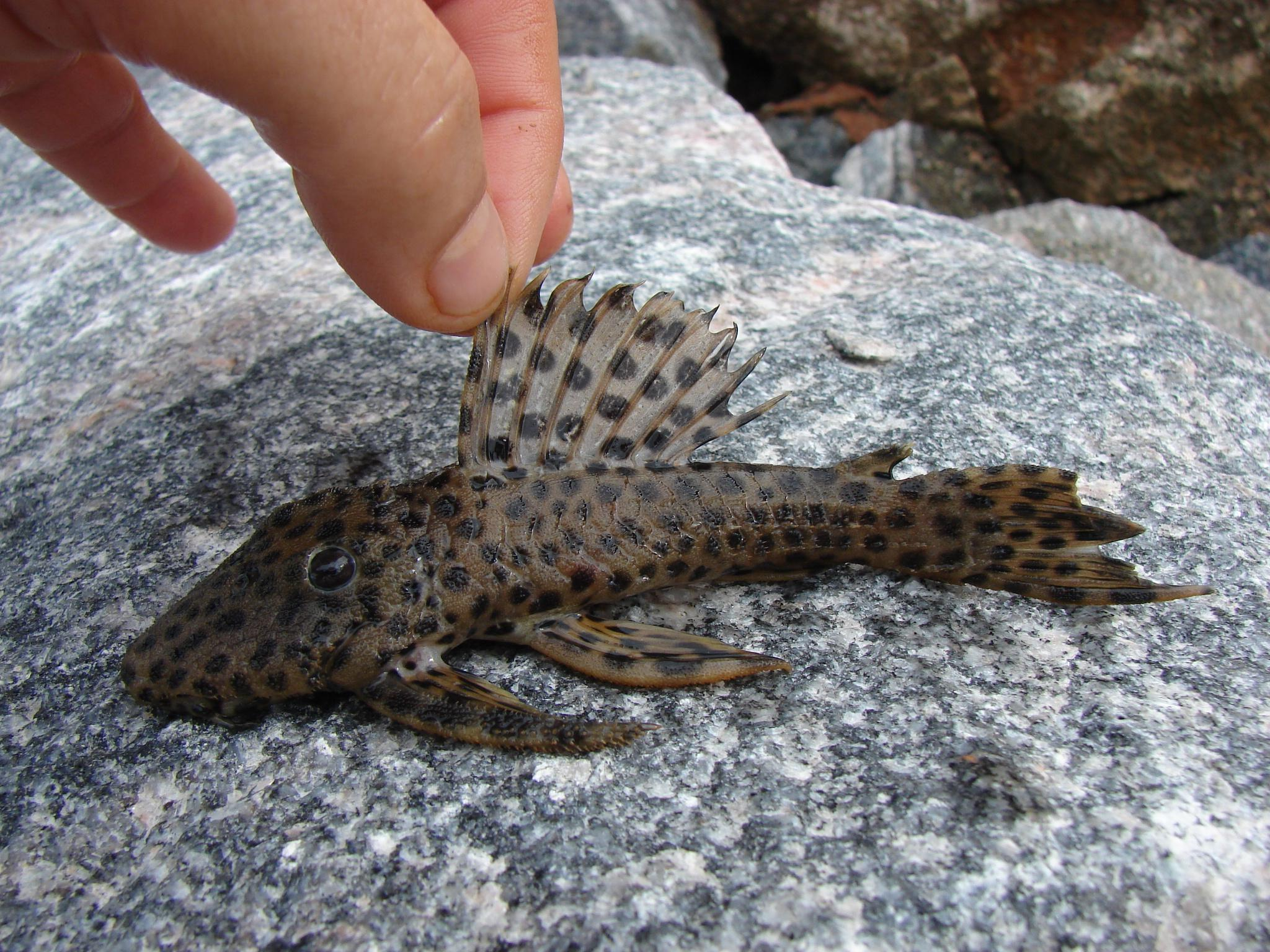

Conservation status
- Near Threatened (IUCN 3.1)

Scientific classification
- Kingdom: Animalia
- Phylum: Chordata
- Class: Actinopterygii
- Order: Siluriformes
- Family: Loricariidae
- Subfamily: Hypostominae
- Genus: Leporacanthicus
- Species: L. heterodon

Binomial name
- Leporacanthicus heterodon Isbrücker & Nijssen, 1989

= Leporacanthicus heterodon =

Species of fish

Leporacanthicus heterodon is a species of freshwater ray-finned fish belonging to the family Loricariidae, the suckermouth armoured catfishes, and the subfamily Hypostominae, the suckermouth catfishes. This catfish is endemic to Brazil where it occurs in the Xingu River in the states of Pará and Mato Grosso. This species reaches a standard length of 16 cm (6.3 in).
