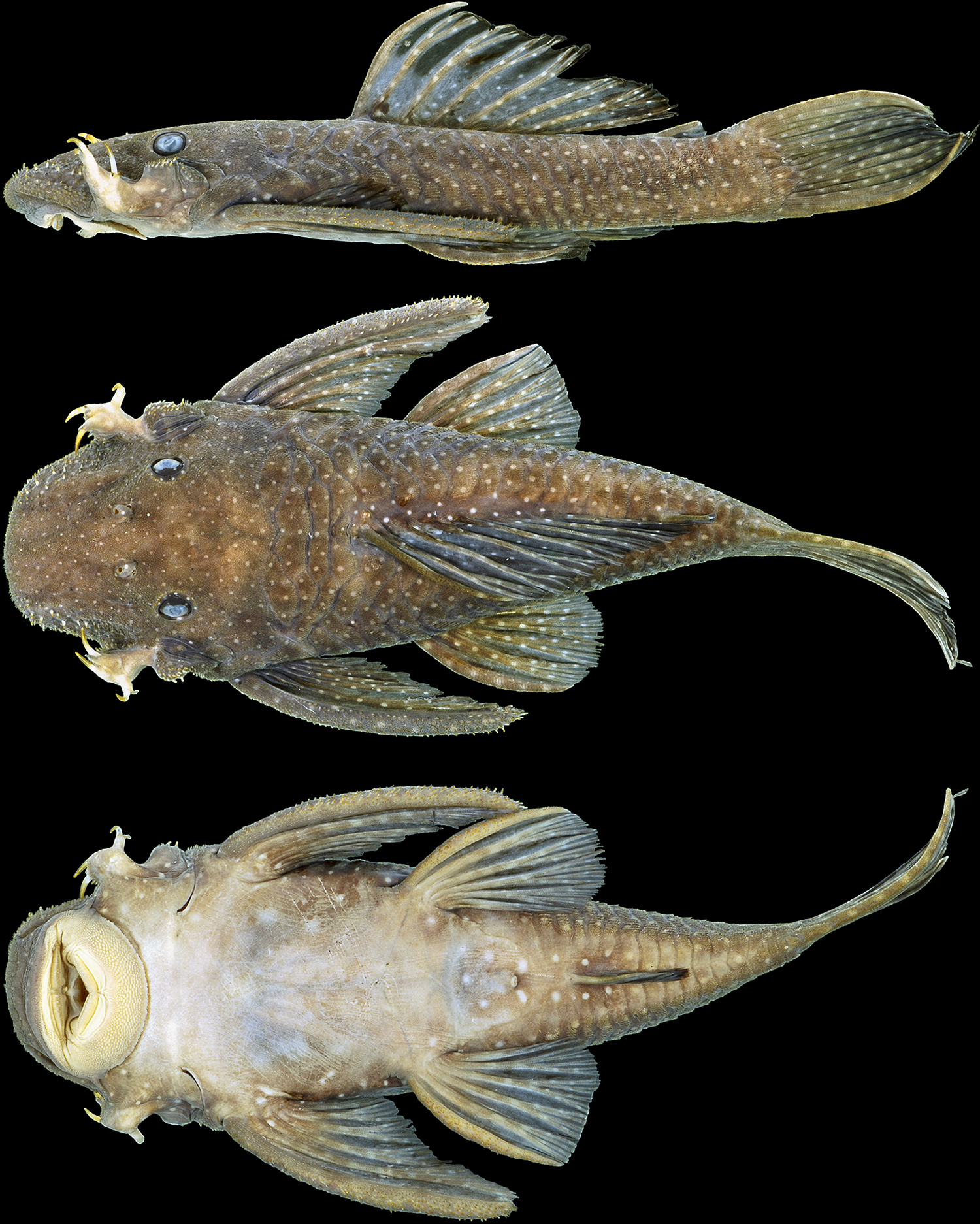

Scientific classification
- Kingdom: Animalia
- Phylum: Chordata
- Class: Actinopterygii
- Order: Siluriformes
- Family: Loricariidae
- Genus: Hopliancistrus
- Species: H. wolverine

Binomial name
- Hopliancistrus wolverine Oliveira, Zuanon, Rapp Py-Daniel, Birindelli & Sousa, 2021

= Hopliancistrus wolverine =

Species of fish

Hopliancistrus wolverine, also known as the wolverine pleco, and designated the L-number L017 or LDA15, is a species of freshwater ray-finned fish belonging to the family Loricariidae, the suckermouth armoured catfishes, and the subfamily Hypostominae, the suckermouth catfishes. They were first found in the Xingu River, Brazil. It has strong lateral curved spikes called odontodes tucked under its gills that can be extended. It is named after the Marvel Comics character Wolverine. They reach 15.0 cm in size on average. It can be identified by the presence of five branched anal-fin rays and small yellow dots on its head and fins.
