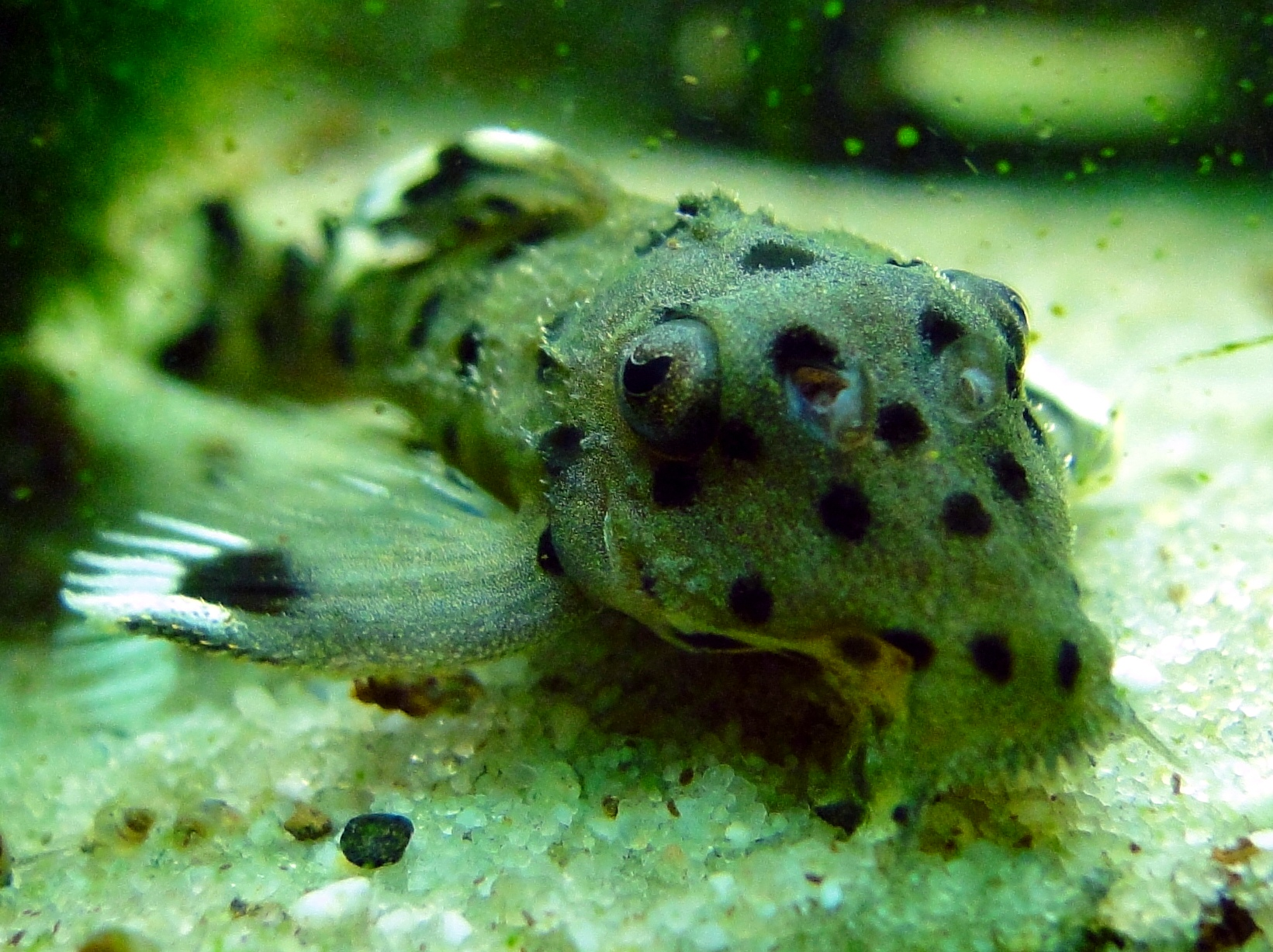
- Leporacanthicus joselimai

Scientific classification
- Kingdom: Animalia
- Phylum: Chordata
- Class: Actinopterygii
- Order: Siluriformes
- Family: Loricariidae
- Subfamily: Hypostominae
- Genus: Leporacanthicus; Isbrücker & Nijssen, 1989

Type species
- Leporacanthicus galaxias Isbrücker & Nijssen, 1989

= Leporacanthicus =

Genus of fishes

Leporacanthicus is a genus of freshwater ray-finned fish belonging to the family Loricariidae, the suckermouth armoured catfishes, and the subfamily Hypostominae, the suckermouth catfishes. The catfishes in this genus are found in South America.

== Species ==
Leporacanthicus contains the following valid species:

- Leporacanthicus galaxias Isbrücker & Nijssen, 1989
- Leporacanthicus heterodon Isbrücker & Nijssen, 1989
- Leporacanthicus joselimai Isbrücker & Nijssen, 1989
- Leporacanthicus triactis Isbrücker, Nijssen & Nico, 1992

== Distribution ==
The genus has been reported from the upper Orinoco, the eastern, north-flowing Amazon tributaries, and the Tocantins River. Species of Leporacanthicus typically inhabit fast-flowing, well-oxygenated river sections with rocky or gravel substrates.

== Description ==
Leporacanthicus species have large teeth in the upper jaw; usually there are only two teeth on each premaxilla, the inner teeth very long. Species of Leporacanthicus are medium-sized loricariids with a narrow, pointed head, round lower lip, and fleshy tentacles on the upper lip. The colour pattern is generally dark gray to black with white to golden spots or a light gray with medium-sized black spots. The abdomen is naked (scaleless and unplated). The caudal fin is straight and angled posteroventrally. L. galaxias are basic black with many white spots. L. triactis are brown, gray, or charcoal black, save for vivid orange or yellow blotches on the spines of the non-paired fins.

It has been hypothesized that the enlarged teeth of the upper jaw are used to remove snails from their shells. This has been observed in L. joselimai, but specimens from Venezuela seem to have a lot of caddis flies as well as freshwater sponges in the gut.

== In the aquarium ==
Leporacanthicus are called vampire plecostomus in the aquarium literature in reference to their large teeth that are characteristic of the genus. These species should be fed invertebrate matter such as mollusks or crustaceans; however, they will accept other foods as well. These fish are territorial species. L. galaxias originates from oxygen-rich environments and should be provided with such a habitat in the aquarium. This fish is not often seen during the day. Breeding has been accomplished for L. galaxias but not documented.
