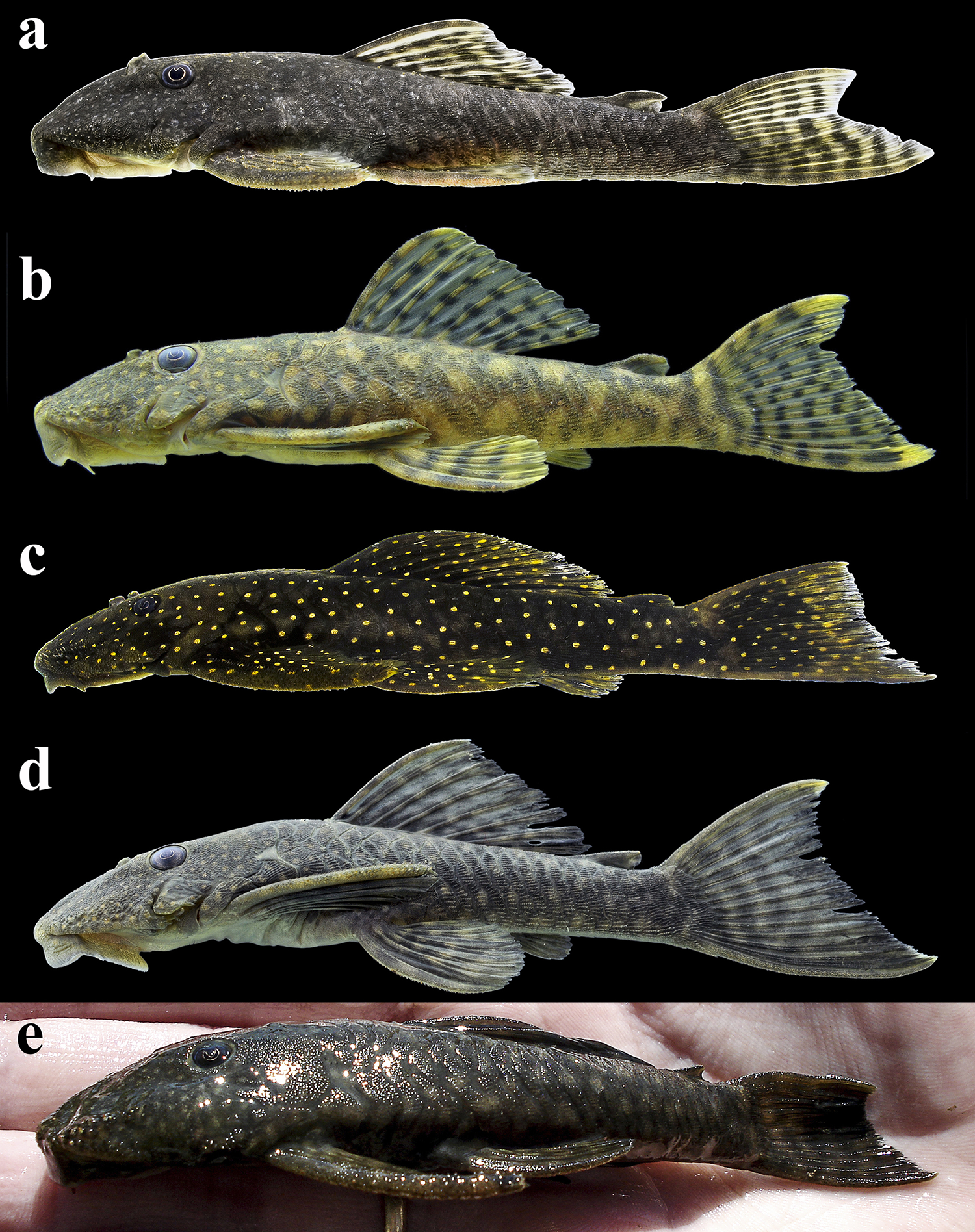
- (a) Hopliancistrus tricornis; (b) H. munduruku; (c) H. wolverine; (d) H. xikrin and (e) H. xavante

Scientific classification
- Kingdom: Animalia
- Phylum: Chordata
- Class: Actinopterygii
- Order: Siluriformes
- Family: Loricariidae
- Subfamily: Hypostominae
- Genus: Hopliancistrus; Isbrücker & Nijssen, 1989

Type species
- Hopliancistrus tricornis Isbrücker & Nijssen, 1989

= Hopliancistrus =

Genus of fishes

Hopliancistrus is a genus of freshwater ray-finned fish belonging to the family Loricariidae, the suckermouth armoured catfishes, and the subfamily Hypostominae, the suckermouth catfishes. These catfishes are endemic to Brazil where they are found in Pará, with one species, H. xavante extending into Mato Grosso.

== Taxonomy ==
Hopliancistrus was first formally proposed as a monospecific genus in 1989 by the Dutch ichthyologists Isaäc J. H. Isbrücker and Han Nijssen when they described its only species and designated type species, Hopliancistrus tricornis, giving its type locality as Poça de Pedra on the Tapajós River, São Luis, Pará State. Some authorities regard this genus as being within the tribe Ancistrini of the subfamily Hypostominae, but Eschmeyer's Catalog of Fishes does not recognise tribes within the subfamily Hypostominae.

== Species ==
Hopliancistrus contains the following species:

- Hopliancistrus munduruku Oliveira, Zuanon, Rapp Py-Daniel, Birindelli & Sousa, 2021
- Hopliancistrus tricornis Isbrücker & Nijssen, 1989
- Hopliancistrus wolverine Oliveira, Zuanon, Rapp Py-Daniel, Birindelli & Sousa, 2021
- Hopliancistrus xavante Oliveira, Zuanon, Rapp Py-Daniel, Birindelli & Sousa, 2021
- Hopliancistrus xikrin Oliveira, Zuanon, Rapp Py-Daniel, Birindelli & Sousa, 2021

== Etymology ==
The generic name alludes to ὅπλον "hóplon" meaning armour or shield, appended to Ancistrus, which is the type genus of the tribe Ancistrini.
