= List of fishes of the Magdalena River =

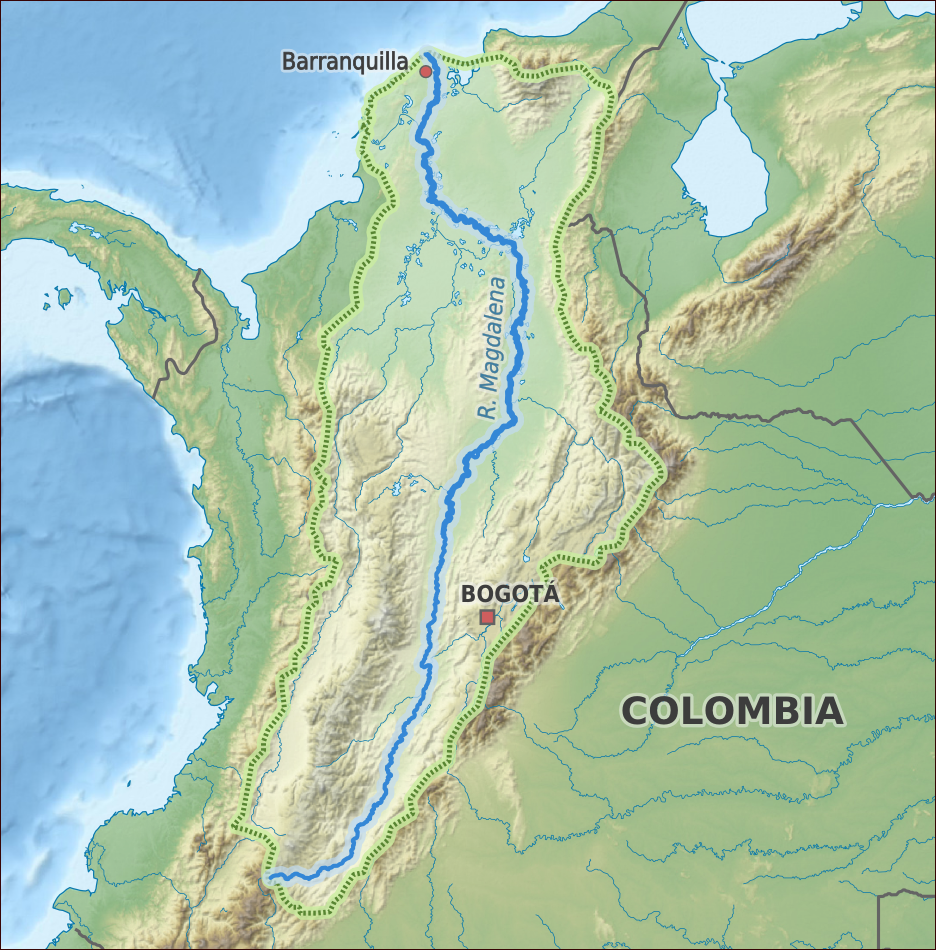
The Magdalena River Basin in Colombia

The following is a list of fishes present in the Colombian Magdalena River.

== A ==
- Abramites eques
- Acestrocephalus anomalus
- Aequidens pulcher
- Ancistrus caucanus
- Ancistrus tolima
- Ancistrus triradiatus
- Andinoacara latifrons
- Argopleura magdalenensis
- Astroblepus homodon
- Astroblepus santanderensis
- Astyanax caucanus
- Astyanax filiferus
- Astyanax magdalenae
- Astyanax orthodus

== B ==
- Brachyhypopomus occidentalis
- Brycon labiatus
- Brycon moorei
- Brycon rubricauda
- Bryconamericus caucanus
- Bunocephalus colombianus

== C ==
- Caquetaia kraussii
- Carlastyanax aurocaudatus
- Centrochir crocodili
- Cetopsorhamdia boquillae
- Cetopsorhamdia molinae
- Cetopsorhamdia nasus
- Chaetostoma brevilabiatum
- Chaetostoma thomsoni
- Characidium caucanum
- Creagrutus guanes
- Creagrutus magdalenae
- Creagrutus nigrostigmatus
- Ctenolucius hujeta
- Curimata mivartii
- Cynodonichthys elegans
- Magdalena rivulus (Cynodonichthys magdalenae)
- Cynopotamus magdalenae
- Cyphocharax magdalenae

== D ==
- Dasyloricaria filamentosa
- Dasyloricaria seminuda
- Dupouyichthys sapito

== E ==
- Eigenmannia virescens
- Eremophilus mutisii

== F ==
- Farlowella yarigui

== G ==
- Gasteropelecus maculatus
- Genycharax tarpon
- Geophagus steindachneri
- Gephyrocharax caucanus
- Gephyrocharax martae
- Gilbertolus alatus
- Gilded catfish (Zungaro zungaro)
- Grundulus bogotensis

== H ==
- Hemibrycon antioquiae
- Hemibrycon cardalensis
- Hemibrycon decurrens
- Hemibrycon fasciatus
- Hemibrycon tolimae
- Hexanematichthys bonillai
- Hoplosternum magdalenae
- Hyphessobrycon panamensis
- Hyphessobrycon proteus
- Hypostomus hondae
- Hypostomus winzi

== I ==
- Ichthyoelephas longirostris (Steindachner, 1879)
- Imparfinis nemacheir

== K ==
- Kronoheros umbriferus

== L ==
- Lasiancistrus carnegiei
- Lasiancistrus caucanus
- Lasiancistrus volcanensis
- Lebiasina floridablancaensis
- Leporinus muyscorum
- Liposarcus multiradiatus

== M ==
- Megalonema xanthum

== N ==
- New Granada sea catfish (Notarius bonillai)

== P ==
- Panaque cochliodon
- Paravandellia phaneronema
- Piabucina pleurotaenia
- Pimelodus blochii Valenciennes, 1840
- Plagioscion surinamensis
- Poecilia caucana
- Potamotrygon magdalenae
- Prochilodus magdalenae
- Pseudocetopsis othonops
- Pseudopimelodus schultzi
- Pseudoplatystoma magdaleniatum

== R ==
- Rhamdia quelen
- Rineloricaria magdalenae
- Roeboides dayi

== S ==
- Saccoderma hastatus
- Salminus affinis
- Sorubim cuspicaudus
- Sorubim lima
- Sternopygus macrurus
- Sturisoma aureum
- Sturisomatichthys leightoni

== T ==
- Trachelyopterus insignis
- Trachelyopterus peloichthys
- Triportheus magdalenae

== X ==
- Xyliphius magdalenae
