= Acara =

Acara may refer to:

== Fish ==
Acara is the common name for several species of freshwater fish in the cichlid family:

- Cichlasoma bimaculatum, a spotted fish known as the black acara
- Andinoacara pulcher, a colorful fish known as the blue acara
- Andinoacara latifrons, a striped fish known as the platinum acara
- Acarichthys heckelii, known as the threadfin acara or Heckel's thread-finned acara
- Ivanacara adoketa, a tropical fish known as the zebra acara

== Places ==
- Acara (region) or Adjara, a former region of the Ottoman Empire in present-day Georgia
- Acará, a municipality in Pará, Brazil

== Other uses ==
- Amarillo Citizens Against Repent Amarillo, a group opposing spiritual mapping
- Australian Curriculum, Assessment and Reporting Authority, an independent authority responsible for the development of a national Australian curriculum
- Ācāra, community norms in classical Hindu law

== See also ==
- Achara (disambiguation)
- Akara, a fritter made from cowpeas
