= Ancistrus centrolepis =

Conservation status
- Least Concern (IUCN 3.1)

Scientific classification
- Kingdom: Animalia
- Phylum: Chordata
- Class: Actinopterygii
- Order: Siluriformes
- Family: Loricariidae
- Genus: Ancistrus
- Species: A. centrolepis

Binomial name
- Ancistrus centrolepis Regan, 1913

Synonyms
- Ancistrus melas C. H. Eigenmann, 1916; Ancistrus baudensis Fowler, 1945

Species of fish

Ancistrus centrolepisis a species of freshwater ray-finned fish belonging to the family Loricariidae, the suckermouth armoured catfishes, and the subfamily Hypostominae, the suckermouth catfishes. This catfish is found in Colombia and Panama.

== Taxonomy ==
Ancistrus centrolepis was first formally described in 1913 by the British ichthyologist Charles Tate Regan with its type locality given as the Río Condoto, Colombia. Eschmeyer's Catalog of Fishes classified the genus Ancistrus in the subfamily Hypostominae, the suckermouth catfishes, within the suckermouth armored catfish family Loricariidae. It has also been classified in the tribe Ancistrini by some authorities.

== Etymology ==
Ancistrus centrolepis is classified in the genus Ancistrus, a name coined by Rudolf Kner when he proposed the genus but Kner did not explain the etymology of the name. It is thought to be from the Greek ágkistron, meaning a "fish hook" or the "hook of a spindle", a reference to the hooked odontodes on the interopercular bone. The specific name, centrolepis, combines "centro-", from kentron, a "sharp point", with lepis which means "scale", a reference to the 2 or 3 middle plates in the series along the lateral line having enlarged spinules and with each scale having well-developed spines along its rear edge.

== Description ==
Ancistrus centrolepis reaches a standard length of 18.4 cm (7.2 in). Ancistrus species develop soft, bushy tentacles on the snout when sexually mature, these are better developed in the males than they are in females. This species can be told apart from the other trans-Andean Ancistrus species having 1 to 3 rows of highly hypertrophied odontodes, some of which are almost the same width as the supporting plate, on the ples on the lateral line and by the body being wholly dark or light in colour with dark spots.

== Distribution and habit ==
Ancistrus caucanus is found in Panama and Colombia. In Panama occurs in the Bayano and Tuira River basins. In Colombia it is found i the Pacific versant rivers of the Chocó Department, as well as in the Baudó, Dagua and San Juan River basins; and in the Caribbean versant Atrato River. This catfish is found in pools with fallen timber and rocks to hide among.
