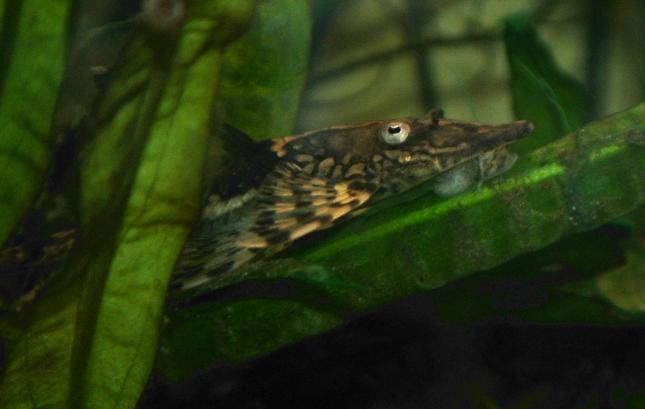

Scientific classification
- Kingdom: Animalia
- Phylum: Chordata
- Class: Actinopterygii
- Order: Siluriformes
- Family: Loricariidae
- Genus: Sturisomatichthys
- Species: S. reinae

Binomial name
- Sturisomatichthys reinae Londoño-Burbano & R. E. dos Reis, 2019

= Sturisomatichthys reinae =

Species of catfish

Sturisomatichthys reinae is a species of freshwater ray-finned fish belonging to the family Loricariidae, the suckermouth armored catfishes, and the subfamily Loricariinae, the mailed catfishes. This catfish occurs in the Baudó River basin in Colombia. The species was described in 2019 by Alejandro Londoño-Burbano (of the Federal University of Rio de Janeiro) and Roberto E. Reis (of the Pontifical Catholic University of Rio Grande do Sul) as part of a taxonomic revision of the genus Sturisomatichthys.

== Etymology ==
The fish is named in honor of Ruth Gisela Reina (1977–2016), a Colombian-born former curator of fishes, at the Smithsonian Tropical Research Institute in Panama, because of her contributions to the knowledge of fishes and invaluable help and assistance for several ichthyologists around the world; she died rescuing her son on a beach in Colón

== Aquarium trade ==
Sturisomatichthys reinae appears in the aquarium trade, where it is frequently referred to as the royal twig catfish. It is often confused with the related species Sturisomatichthys aureum.
