= Sturisomatichthys tamanae =

Conservation status
- Data Deficient (IUCN 3.1)

Scientific classification
- Kingdom: Animalia
- Phylum: Chordata
- Class: Actinopterygii
- Order: Siluriformes
- Family: Loricariidae
- Genus: Sturisomatichthys
- Species: S. tamanae

Binomial name
- Sturisomatichthys tamanae (Regan, 1912)

Synonyms
- Oxyloricaria tamanae Regan, 1912

Species of fish

Sturisomatichthys tamanae is a species of freshwater ray-finned fish belonging to the family Loricariidae, the suckermouth armored catfishes, and the subfamily Loricariinae, the mailed catfishes. This catfish is endemic to Colombia where it occurs in the San Juan River, Atrato and Baudó rivers. This species attains a total length of 22.5 cm (8.9 in) and species in the genus Sturisomatichthys are known to be facultative air breathers.
