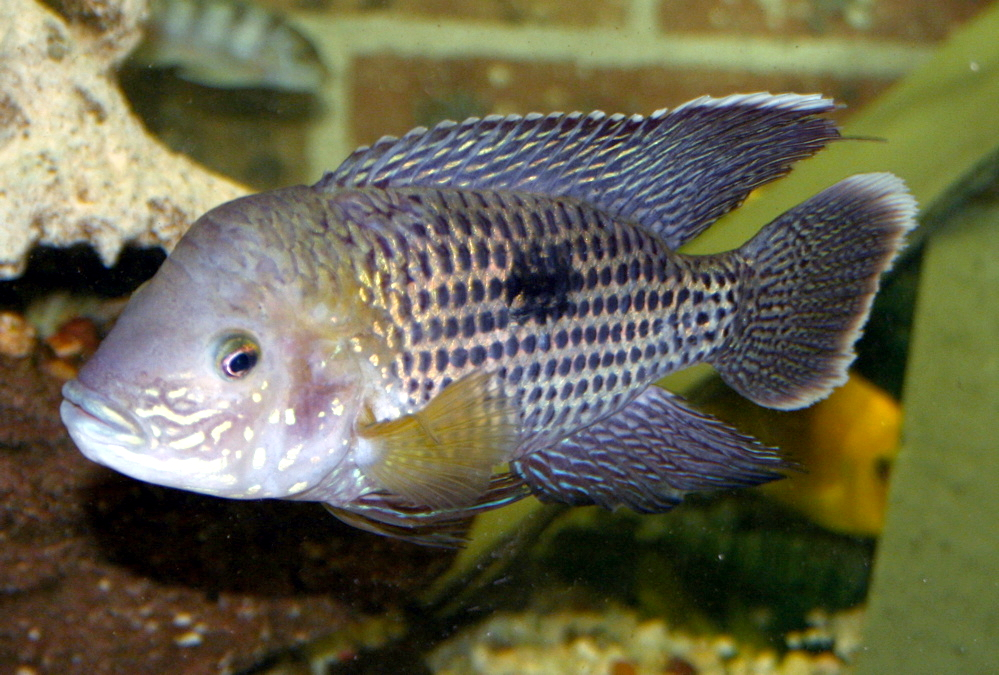

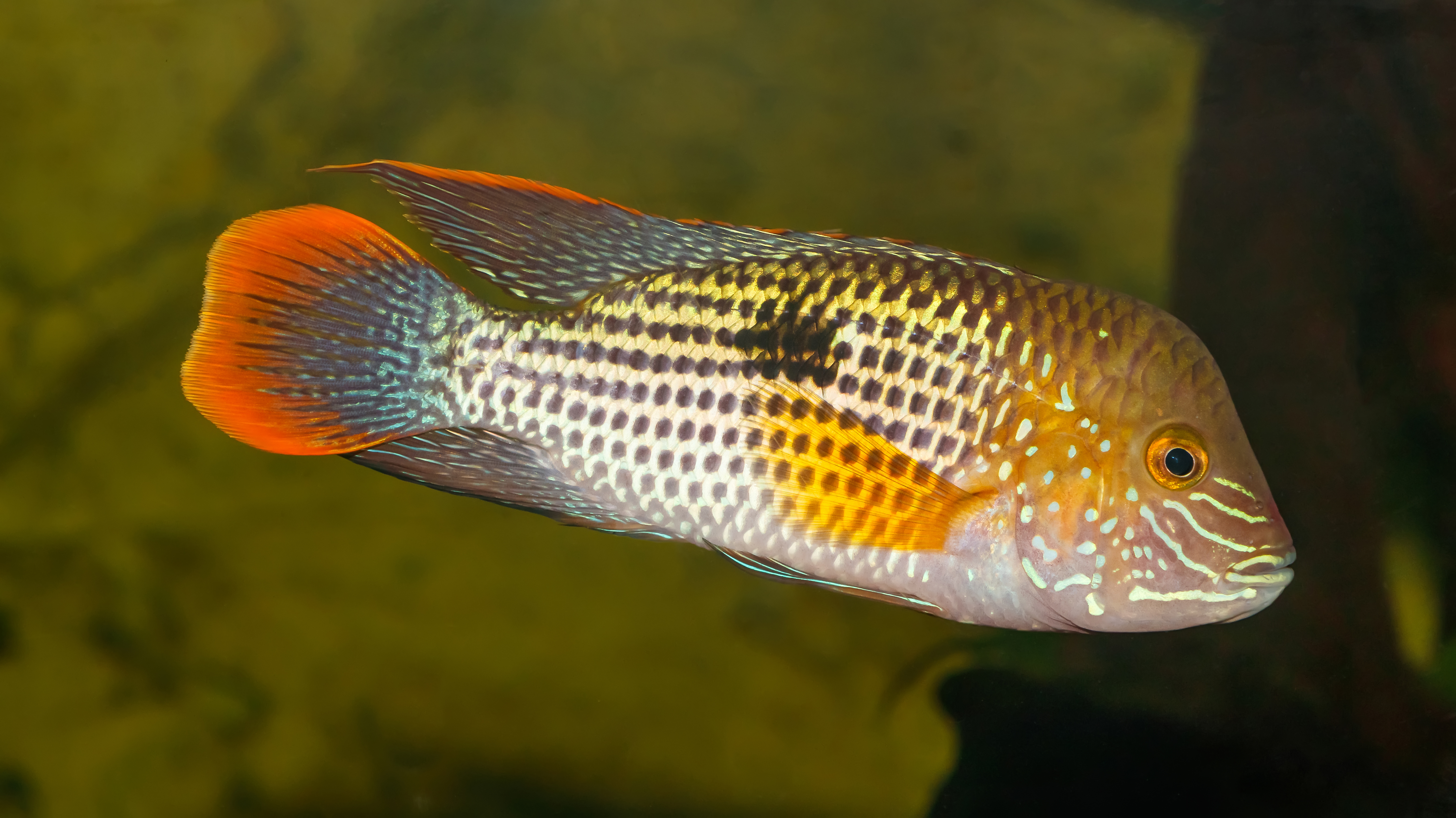
- males of white-edged and gold-edged morphs

Conservation status
- Least Concern (IUCN 3.1)

Scientific classification
- Kingdom: Animalia
- Phylum: Chordata
- Class: Actinopterygii
- Order: Cichliformes
- Family: Cichlidae
- Genus: Andinoacara
- Species: A. rivulatus

Binomial name
- Andinoacara rivulatus (Günther, 1860)

Synonyms
- Aequidens rivulatus (Günther, 1860); Acara aequinoctialis Regan, 1905; Acara azurifer Fowler, 1911; Chromis rivulata Günther, 1860

= Green terror =

Species of fish

The green terror (Andinoacara rivulatus, syn. Aequidens rivulatus) is a colorful freshwater fish in the cichlid family. The fish originates from the Pacific side of South America from the Tumbes River in Peru to the Esmeraldas River in Ecuador. It is polymorphic and can have white or gold-orange edging to the tail and dorsal fins. It has historically been confused with two other species that always have narrow, clearly defined white edging, the more southerly distributed A. stalsbergi (often considered the "true" green terror) and the more northerly A. blombergi.

== Species ==
Males of A. rivulatus grow larger than females and may reach lengths of up to 30 cm (12 in). Females are sexually mature at around 12 cm (4.7 in).

As the name implies, late juvenile-phase and adult-phase specimens can be very aggressive. This is not guaranteed, however, and peaceful individuals can be observed. Juveniles of A. rivulatus are often sold in aquarium stores. This species is not to be confused with the blue acara (A. pulcher) which is similar in appearance; the blue acara is not as aggressive and does not grow as large as the gold saum.

The fish is somewhat deep-bodied, possessing a prominent forehead. Adult males develop a pronounced forehead hump, composed of fatty tissue. Juveniles are tan colored with silver-blue flecks and lack the bright iridescent blue, green, and orange coloration and long, flowing fins of adult specimens.

In nature, A. rivulatus lives in a tropical climate and prefers water with a 6.5–8.0 pH, a water hardness of 25.0 dGH, and a temperature range of 20–24 °C (68–75 °F).

== In the aquarium ==
A. rivulatus is a popular fish in the aquarium trade and is noted for its hardiness, as well as its aesthetic appeal. The fish may grow up to 30 cm (12 in) in length, though 15 to 20 cm (5.9 to 7.9 in) lengths are more typical, fish do not grow based on the size of their habitat.

A. rivulatus is an inherently aggressive fish. With the exception of fully mature P. dovii (wolf cichlid) and P. managuense (jaguar cichlid), which rarely cohabit peacefully, A. rivulatus is cunning enough to survive—and even thrive—with larger cichlids. However, as a rule, a preying cichlid is capable of consuming any animal whose dimensions are inferior to that of the cichlid's fully expanded jaw. A. rivulatus of an appropriate size can often be assimilated with R. octofasciata (Jack Dempsey cichlid), A. citrinellus (midas cichlid), T. meeki (firemouth cichlid), flowerhorns (no scientific designation), smaller P. managuense (jaquar cichlid) and P. dovii (wolf cichlid), and other similarly aggressive cichlids.

== Role in hormone research ==
A. rivulatus has also been used as a model for the effects of testosterone on lateralization.

== See also ==
- List of freshwater aquarium fish species
