= Sturisomatichthys varii =

Scientific classification
- Kingdom: Animalia
- Phylum: Chordata
- Class: Actinopterygii
- Order: Siluriformes
- Family: Loricariidae
- Genus: Sturisomatichthys
- Species: S. varii

Binomial name
- Sturisomatichthys varii Londoño-Burbano & R. E. dos Reis, 2019

Species of catfish

Sturisomatichthys varii is a species of freshwater ray-finned fish belonging to the family Loricariidae, the suckermouth armored catfishes, and the subfamily Loricariinae, the mailed catfishes. This catfish occurs in the San Juan River basin in Colombia. The species was described in 2019 by Alejandro Londoño-Burbano (of the Federal University of Rio de Janeiro) and Roberto E. Reis (of the Pontifical Catholic University of Rio Grande do Sul) as part of a taxonomic revision of the genus Sturisomatichthys.

== Etymology ==
The fish is named in honor of Richard P. Vari (1949–2016), of the National Museum of Natural History, of the Smithsonian Institution in Washington, D.C..
