= Achara =

Achara may refer to:

- Ācāra, a concept used in Classical Hindu law
- Achara (clan), a Jat clan of Rajasthan
- Achara Takipur, a town in Farrukhabad district in the Indian State of Uttar Pradesh
- Ifunanyachi Achara (born 1997), Nigerian footballer
- Kieron Achara (born 1983), Scottish basketball player
- Adjara, an autonomous republic of Georgia
- Atchara (also spelled as Atsara or Achara), pickled green papaya in Philippine cuisine

== See also ==
- Acara (disambiguation)
