= Joanna Alfaro Shigueto =

Peruvian biologist

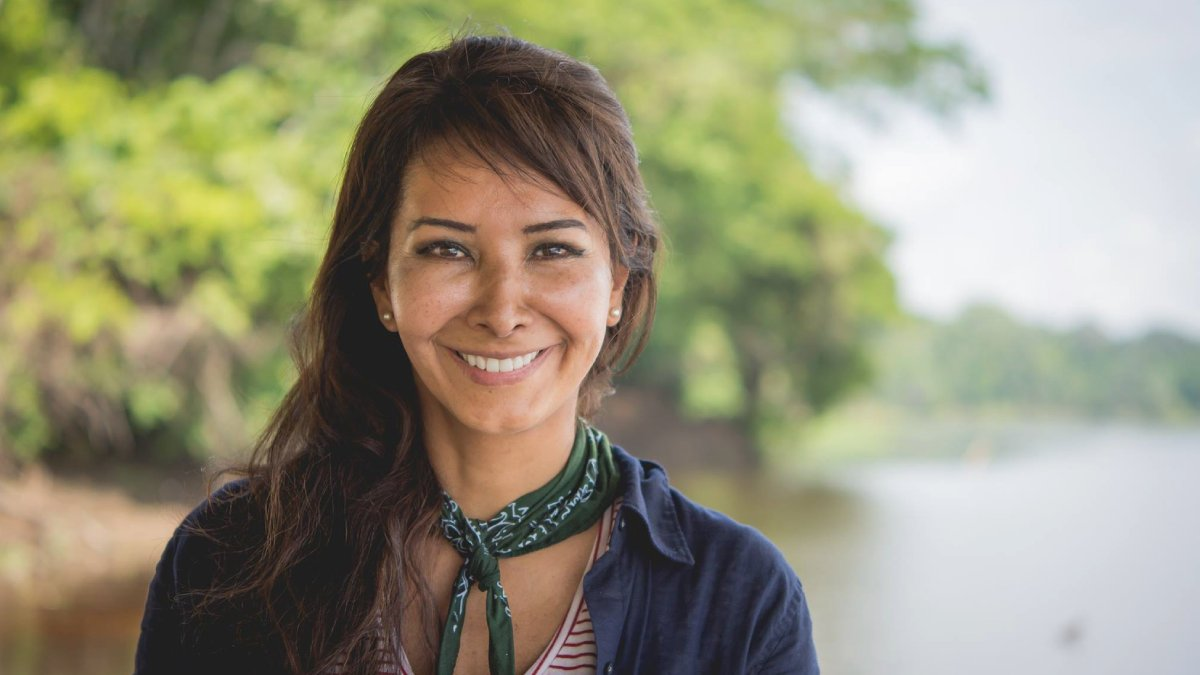
- Born: Lima, Peru
- Education: Universidad Ricardo Palma (B.S); University of Exeter (PhD)
- Scientific career
- Fields: Marine biology; Biodiversity conservation; Fisheries
- Institutions: Universidad Científica del Sur

Joanna Alfaro Shigueto (born 1969, Lima) is a Peruvian biologist specializing in marine biodiversity conservation. She is the co-founder of the ProDelphinus NGO, an organization dedicated to the research and preservation of marine species in Peru. Her work focuses on marine biodiversity, natural resource conservation, artisanal fisheries, and sustainability. She has contributed to over 125 scientific studies and serves as a lead researcher and professor at Universidad Científica del Sur.

== Early life and education ==
Joanna Alfaro was born in Lima. Her interest in the marine world developed during childhood through frequent visits to Playa La Herradura. During her school years, a biology teacher played a key role in her decision to pursue a career in natural science.

Alfaro earned her Bachelor's degree in biology at Universidad Ricardo Palma. From the beginning of her university education, she showed a strong interest in marine life and aquatic ecosystems. In 2012, she obtained a PhD in philosophy from the University of Exeter (United Kingdom), specializing in marine species conservation.

In 1992, Alfaro graduated as a biologist from Universidad Ricardo Palma.

== Professional career ==
She began her career in marine biology at Instituto del Mar del Perú (IMARPE), working as coordinator of the marine mammal survey program from 1995 to 1997.

In 2001, she co-founded the NGO ProDelphinus, a nonprofit organization that collaborates with the artisanal fishing sector to improve practices from an ecological and social perspective. The NGO has developed educational manuals on handling sea turtles and dolphins in cases of stranding or accidental capture.

Since 2008, Alfaro has worked as a professor and researcher at Universidad Científica del Sur, where she is part of the Seabird Research Group and has contributed to various scientific publications.

== Publications and scientific research ==
Alfaro has participated in the development of various guides and manuals, including:

- Guide to the Identification of Beaks from Some Cephalopod Species Found in the Peruvian Sea.
- "Guías de buenas prácticas de manipulación y liberación de megafauna marina, en casos de captura" [Best Practices Guide for Handling and Releasing Marine Megafauna in Cases of Incidental Capture] (in Spanish) – via World Wildlife Foundation.
- Calvo-Mac, Carlos; Mires, Jannyna; Alfaro Shigueto, Joanna; Suarez, Tania; Pereda Sanchez, Alejandro (2022), Manual de atención básica veterinaria para tortugas marinas varadas vivas en Perú [Basic Veterinary Care Manual for Stranded Live Sea Turtles in Peru]

One of her most notable studies analyzed the DNA of fish sold in cevicherías in Lima, revealing that 78% of the fish did not match the species advertised, exposing mislabeling and possible fraud in seafood commercialization.

Another study identified that dusky dolphins, guanay cormorants, and eagle rays are the species most frequently affected by incidental fishing in Peru.

== Awards and recognitions ==
During her academic years, Alfaro received the Archie Carr Student Award, granted by the International Sea Turtle Society. She also obtained a research scholarship from the University of Exeter to assess artisanal fisheries.

Her main distinctions include:

- 2012: Whitley Fund for Nature, recognizing conservation leaders in the Global South, presented by Princess Anne in London.
- 2015: Marsh Award – Leadership in Conservation for Latin America, for her work in marine conservation in South America and mentoring young researchers.
- 2020: Artífice de la Conservación, awarded by the Carlos Ponce Award.
- 2022: Nominated for the For Women in Science award in the Scientific Excellence category.

Her work has been recognized in publications such as Women in the Bicentennial: Women in Knowledge. In 2021, the National Council for Science, Technology and Innovation (CONCYTEC) recognized her scientific trajectory and featured her in the publication Women Scientists of Peru: 24 Stories to Discover.
