= Cynodonichthys elegans =

Conservation status
- Data Deficient (IUCN 3.1)

Scientific classification
- Kingdom: Animalia
- Phylum: Chordata
- Class: Actinopterygii
- Order: Cyprinodontiformes
- Family: Rivulidae
- Genus: Cynodonichthys
- Species: C. elegans

Binomial name
- Cynodonichthys elegans (Steindachner, 1880)

Synonyms
- Rivulus elegans Steindachner, 1880

Species of fish

Cynodonichthys elegans is a species of killifish from the family Rivulidae which is found in temporary pools in the Cauca River basin and in the San Juan River in the Chocó Department in Colombia.

== See also ==
- List of fishes in the Magdalena River
- List of data deficient fishes
