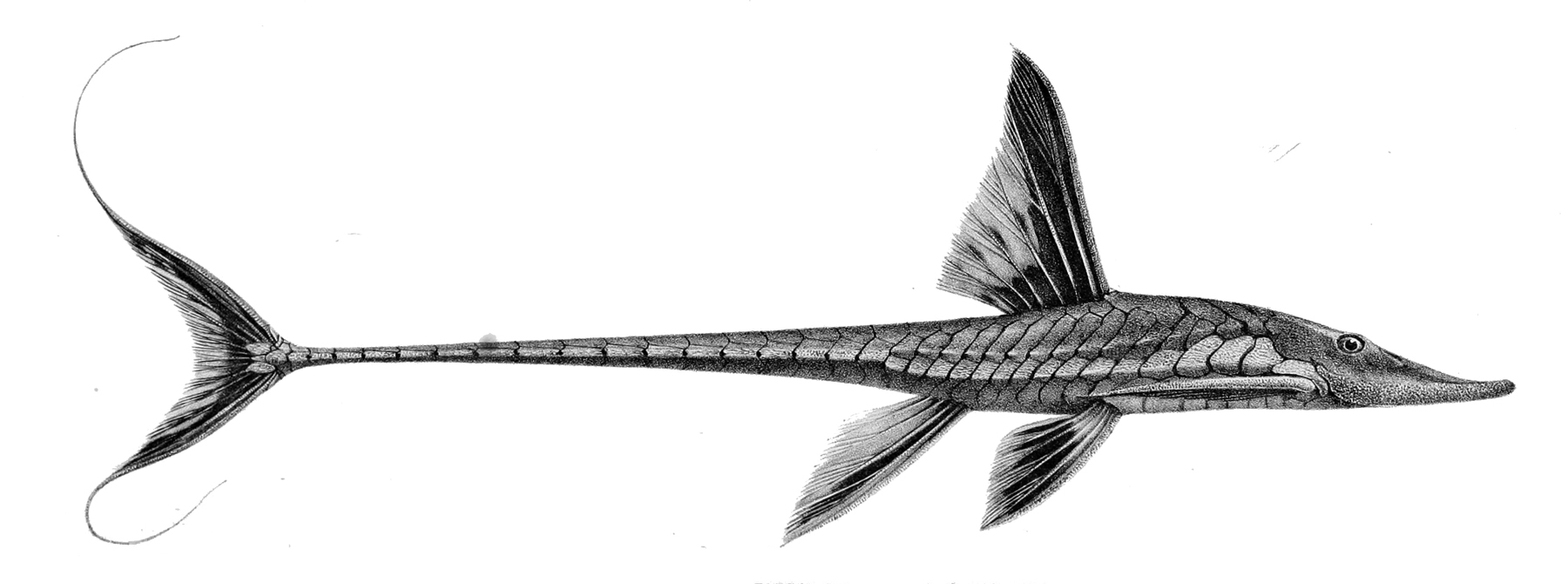

Conservation status
- Critically Endangered (IUCN 3.1)

Scientific classification
- Kingdom: Animalia
- Phylum: Chordata
- Class: Actinopterygii
- Order: Siluriformes
- Family: Loricariidae
- Genus: Sturisomatichthys
- Species: S. frenatus

Binomial name
- Sturisomatichthys frenatus (Boulenger, 1902)

Synonyms
- Loricaria frenata Boulenger, 1902; Sturisoma frenatum (Boulenger, 1902)

= Sturisomatichthys frenatus =

Species of fish

Sturisomatichthys frenatus is a species of freshwater ray-finned fish belonging to the family Loricariidae, the suckermouth armored catfishes, and the subfamily Loricariinae, the mailed catfishes. This catfish is endemic to Ecuador where it occurs in the Santiago-Cayapas drainage system. This species attains a standard length of 24 cm (9.4 in) and species in the genus Sturisomatichthys are known to be facultative air breathers.
