= Belaúnde =

Belaúnde is a surname, and may refer to:

- Alberto Bustamante Belaúnde (1950–2008) - Peruvian politician
- Fernando Belaúnde (1912–2002) - 42nd & 43rd President of Peru
- José Antonio García Belaúnde (1948–2025) - Peruvian diplomat
- Víctor Andrés Belaúnde (1883–1966) - Peruvian diplomat
- Víctor Andrés García Belaúnde (b. 1949) - Peruvian politician
- Víctor Andrés García-Belaúnde Velarde (b. 1977) - Peruvian ethicist
