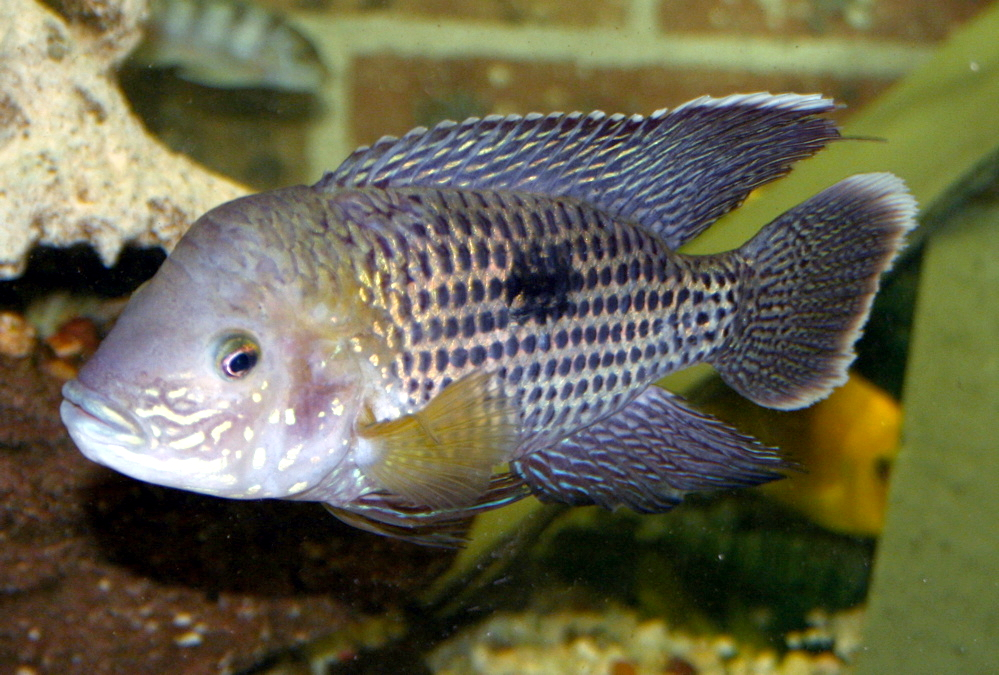
- A. rivulatus

Scientific classification
- Kingdom: Animalia
- Phylum: Chordata
- Class: Actinopterygii
- Division: Teleostei
- Order: Cichliformes
- Family: Cichlidae
- Tribe: Cichlasomatini
- Genus: Andinoacara; Musilová, Říčan & Novák, 2009

Type species
- Acara latifrons Steindachner, 1878

= Andinoacara =

Genus of fishes

Andinoacara is a genus of fish in the family Cichlidae. The genus was described in 2009. Before this the members of Andinoacara were placed in the "catch-all" genus Aequidens although they are not closely related to the other members of this genus. The genus Andinoacara is restricted to freshwater habitats in northwestern South America (Trinidad and the Orinoco Basin west to the Pacific coast of South America as far south as Peru) and southern Central America (Costa Rica and Panama). There are no members of the genus in the Amazon Basin.

== Species ==
There are currently eight recognized species in this genus:

- Andinoacara biseriatus (Regan, 1913)
- Andinoacara blombergi Wijkmark, S. O. Kullander & Barriga S., 2012
- Andinoacara coeruleopunctatus (Kner, 1863)
- Andinoacara latifrons (Steindachner, 1878) (Platinum acara)
- Andinoacara pulcher (Gill, 1858) (Blue acara)
- Andinoacara rivulatus (Gunther, 1860) (Green terror)
- Andinoacara sapayensis (Regan, 1903) (Sapayo cichlid)
- Andinoacara stalsbergi Musilová, I. Schindler & Staeck, 2009
