= Surco River =

Canal in Peru

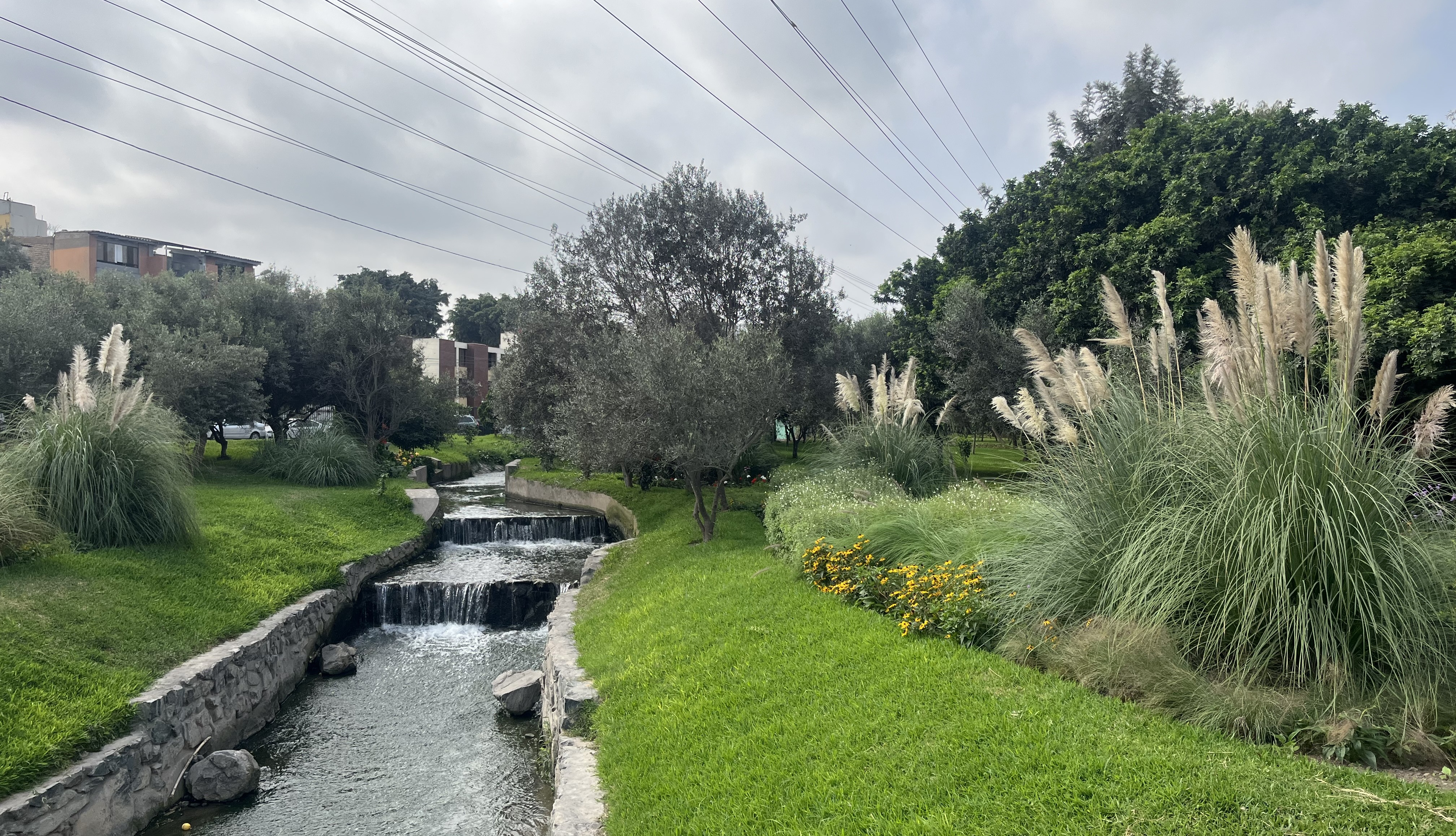
- View of the river in San Borja
- Interactive map of Surco River
- Location: Lima
- Country: Peru

Specifications
- Length: 29.5 km (18.3 miles)

History
- Date of first use: 1st century

Geography
- Start point: Rímac River
- End point: Pacific Ocean
- Branch of: Rímac River

Cultural Heritage of Peru
- Official name: Canal de Surco – Segmento 3
- Type: Immobable tangible
- Designated: March 20, 2019
- Legal basis: R.V. Nº 041-2019-VMPCIC-MC

The Surco River (Spanish: Río Surco), also known as the Surco Canal (Spanish: Canal Surco), is a pre-Columbian irrigation canal in Lima, Peru. It originates from the Rímac River, in the districts of El Agustino and Ate, runs through 17 districts, notably San Borja, Santiago de Surco and Chorrillos, and flows into the Pacific Ocean, at La Chira beach, in the district of Chorrillos.

First used by the Lima culture during the 1st century, the 29.2-kilometre (18.1 mi) canal is the longest in the city of Lima and irrigates a large part of it, passing through 12 districts. Alongside the Huatica, it is one of two pre-Incan aqueducts that continue to be fully operational to date. It is part of the Cultural heritage of Peru.

== Name ==
The canal's name is pre-Columbian in origin, known by the Ichma as Sulco. This name was also given to their chieftainship based in Armatambo, located next to the Morro Solar and today an archaeological site. The change in the name's pronunciation followed the death of Antonio del Solar, Sulco's first Spanish encomendero. Despite it being a man-made stream, it is commonly called a river.

== History ==
The aqueduct was used as an irrigation canal by the Lima, a civilisation that preceded the Inca Empire, since the 1st century. In 1535, Spanish chroniclers described the area as filled with "countless rivers," in reality man-made canals. With a total length of 29.2 kilometres (18.1 mi), it is the longest in the city.

The water from the canal has since been used, in large part, to irrigate the numerous green areas of Lima (parks, gardens, roundabouts and central medians). The canal originally fed the Pantanos de Villa wetlands, but hasty construction in the area led to the changing of its course. In the 1800s, it was used as a gutter following a yellow fever outbreak.

Its high flow caused flooding in some areas of Chorrillos in the 2010s. In 2014, the construction of a treatment plant was planned to cover drinking water in human settlements.

Following calls to designate both the Surco and the Huatica (another pre-Columbian canal), the part of the Surco that flows through San Borja was declared part of the Cultural heritage of Peru.

== See also ==
- Rímac River
