= Andinoacara biseriatus =

Conservation status
- Vulnerable (IUCN 3.1)

Scientific classification
- Kingdom: Animalia
- Phylum: Chordata
- Class: Actinopterygii
- Division: Teleostei
- Order: Cichliformes
- Family: Cichlidae
- Genus: Andinoacara
- Species: A. biseriatus

Binomial name
- Andinoacara biseriatus (Regan, 1913)

Synonyms
- Cichlosoma biseriatum Regan, 1913; Aequidens biseriatus (Regan, 1913)

Species of fish

Andinoacara biseriatus, is a species of fish in the family Cichlidae in the order Perciformes, native to the Atrato, Baudo, and San Juan River basins in Colombia.

== Description ==
Males can reach a length of 8 centimetres (3.1 in) total in length.

== Lifecycle ==
The fish lays up to 120 eggs on flat stones; afterwards both parents care for the eggs and the larvae.

== Conservation ==
IUCN Red List Status is vulnerable.

== Bibliography ==
- Kullander, S.O., 2003. Cichlidae (Cichlids). pp. 605–654. In R.E. Reis, S.O. Kullander and C.J. Ferraris Jr. (eds.) Checklist of the Freshwater Fishes of South and Central America. Porto Alegre: EDIPUCRS, Brasil.
