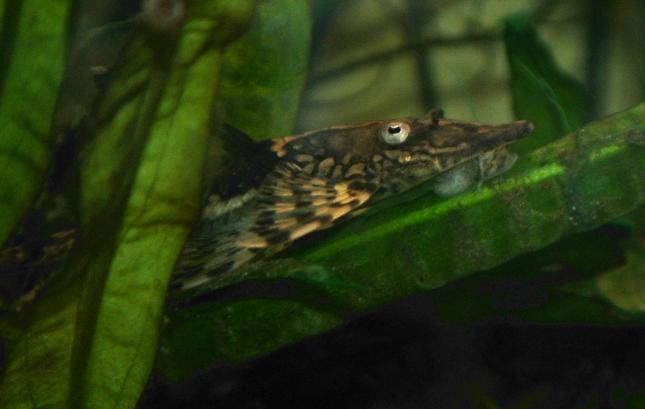

Conservation status
- Least Concern (IUCN 3.1)

Scientific classification
- Kingdom: Animalia
- Phylum: Chordata
- Class: Actinopterygii
- Order: Siluriformes
- Family: Loricariidae
- Genus: Sturisomatichthys
- Species: S. leightoni

Binomial name
- Sturisomatichthys leightoni (Regan, 1912)

Synonyms
- Oxyloricaria leightoni Regan, 1912

= Sturisomatichthys leightoni =

Species of fish

Sturisomatichthys leightoni is a species of freshwater ray-finned fish belonging to the family Loricariidae, the suckermouth armored catfishes, and the subfamily Loricariinae, the mailed catfishes. This catfish is endemic to Colombia where it is found in the upper Magdalena and Cauca River basins, the San Juan River; and in the middle Cesar, Meta and Guaviare rivers. This species attains a standard length of 18 cm (7.1 in) and species in the genus Sturisomatichthys are known to be facultative air breathers.

== Habitat and behaviour ==
Sturisomatichthys leightoni is found in shallow waters where there is a moderate to slow current and where the substrate has a large amount of organic sediment accumulated within rock, coarse sand or fine gravel. It hides within the marginal vegetation and wooden debris. This species shows sexual dimorphism. The eggs are laid on the bottom of the riverbed and the male tends the eggs until they hatch.

== Etymology ==
The catfish is named in honour of Sir Bryan Leighton (1868-1919), who presented the type specimen to the British Museum (Natural History).
