= Andinoacara sapayensis =

Conservation status
- Data Deficient (IUCN 3.1)

Scientific classification
- Kingdom: Animalia
- Phylum: Chordata
- Class: Actinopterygii
- Division: Teleostei
- Order: Cichliformes
- Family: Cichlidae
- Genus: Andinoacara
- Species: A. sapayensis

Binomial name
- Andinoacara sapayensis (Regan, 1903)

Synonyms
- Acara sapayensis Regan, 1903; Aequidens sapayensis (Regan, 1903)

Species of fish

Andinoacara sapayensis, the sapayo cichlid, is a species of fish in the family Cichlidae in the order Perciformes, found on the South American Pacific slope, in the Cayapas River drainage in north-western Ecuador.

== Description ==
Males can reach a length of 10 centimetres (3.9 in) total in length.

== Spawning ==
The fish lays up to 400 eggs with the male defending the territory.

== Bibliography ==
- Kullander, S.O., 2003. Cichlidae (Cichlids). pp. 605–654. In R.E. Reis, S.O. Kullander and C.J. Ferraris Jr. (eds.) Checklist of the Freshwater Fishes of South and Central America. Porto Alegre: EDIPUCRS, Brasil.
