= Esmeraldas River =

River of Ecuador

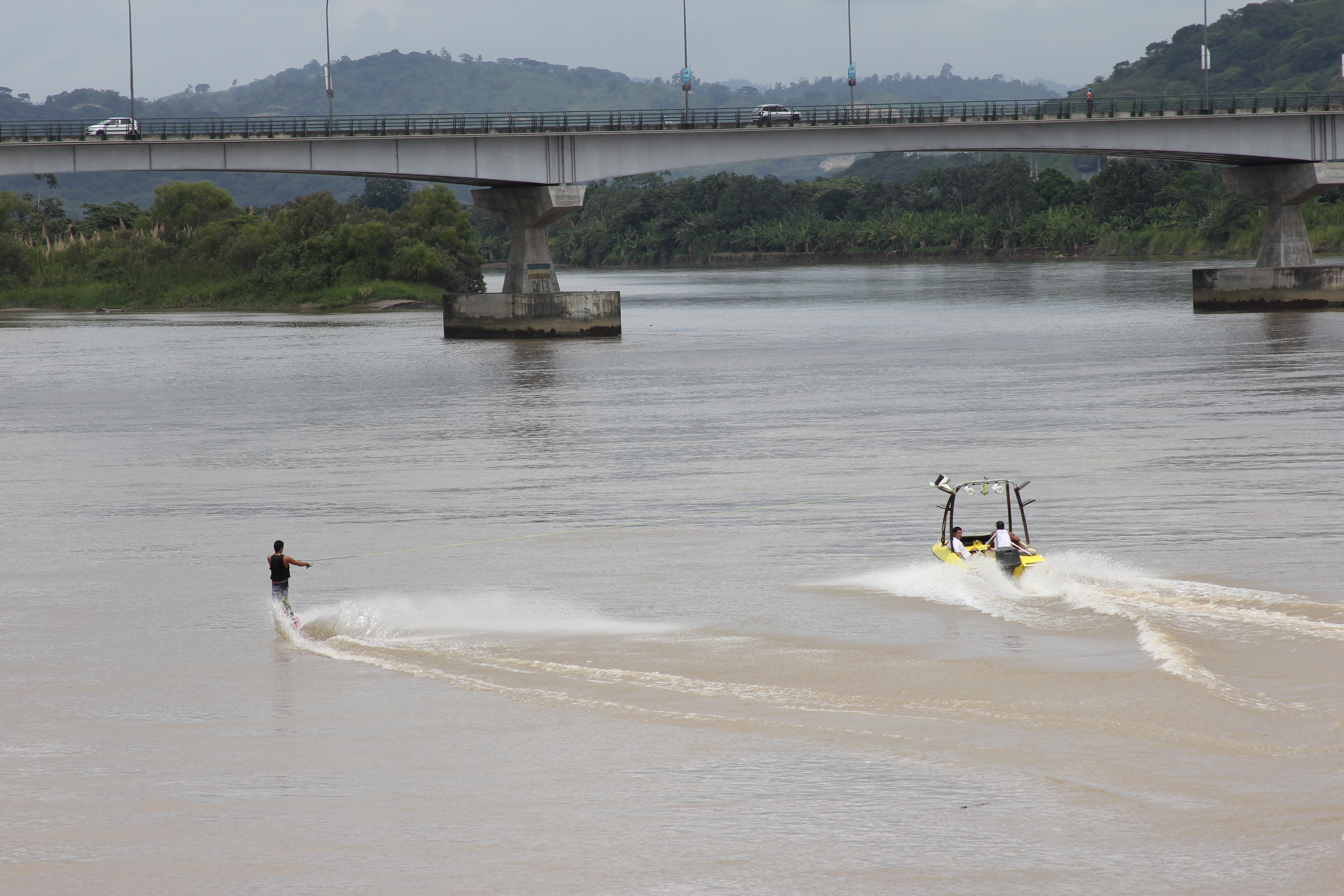

- Mouth location in Ecuador

Location
- Country: Ecuador

Physical characteristics
- Mouth
  - coordinates: 0°59′51″N 79°38′24″W
  - elevation: 0 m (0 ft)
- Length: 210 km (130 mi)

The Esmeraldas River is a 210 km (130 mi) river in northwestern Ecuador that flows into the Pacific Ocean at the city of Esmeraldas. Among its tributaries is the Guayllabamba River which drains Quito. Charles Marie de la Condamine sailed up it and then climbed the Andes Mountains when on the Ecuadorian Expedition that left France in May 1735.

The mouth of the river has extensive stands of mangroves, part of the Esmeraldas–Pacific Colombia mangroves ecoregion.

== Fauna ==
=== Fish ===
- The Green Terror Cichlid Andinoacara rivulatus (Günther, 1860)
- Andinoacara blombergi Wijkmark, S. O. Kullander & Barriga S., 2012

== Environmental issues ==
In March 2025, an environmental emergency was declared in the river after a landslide ruptured a segment of the Trans-Ecuadorian Pipeline System, spilling crude oil into a section of the river near Cube.
