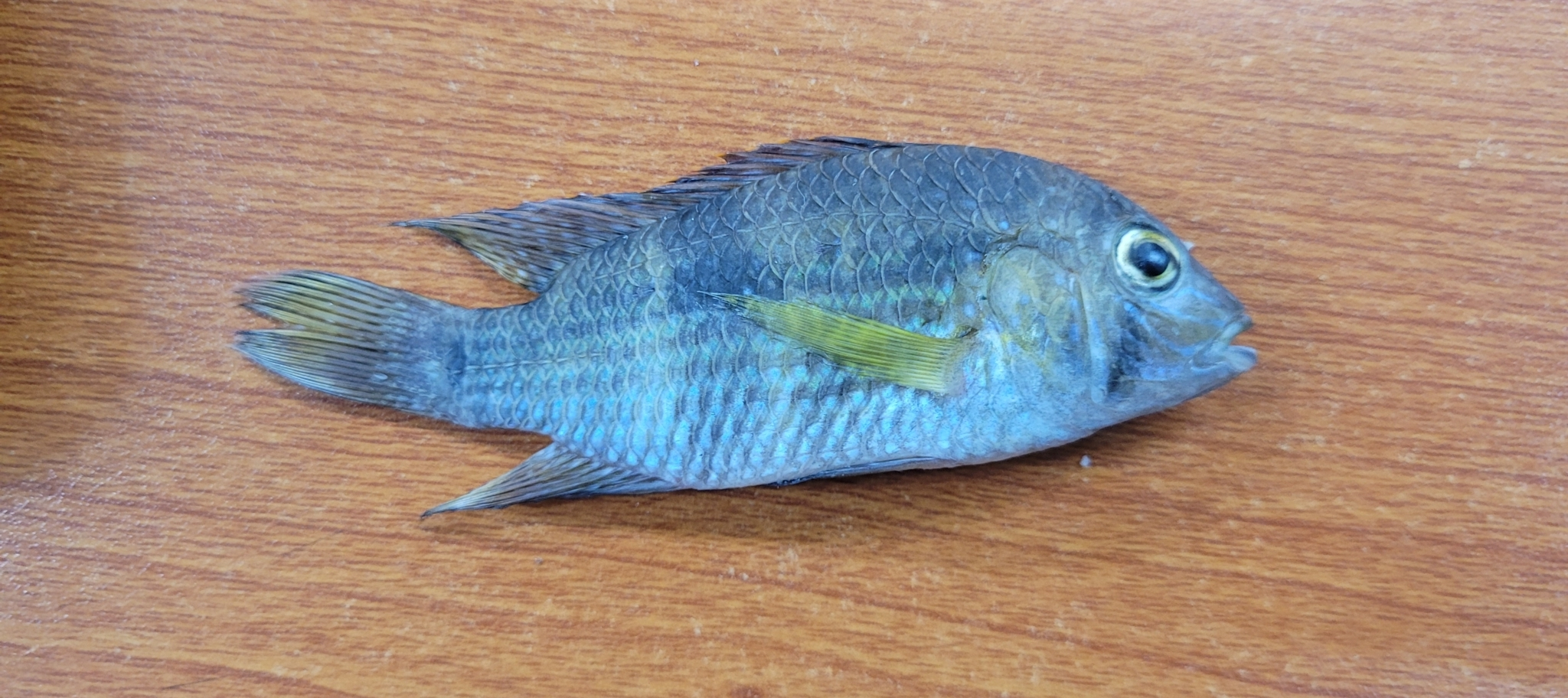

Conservation status
- Least Concern (IUCN 3.1)

Scientific classification
- Kingdom: Animalia
- Phylum: Chordata
- Class: Actinopterygii
- Division: Teleostei
- Order: Cichliformes
- Family: Cichlidae
- Genus: Andinoacara
- Species: A. coeruleopunctatus

Binomial name
- Andinoacara coeruleopunctatus (Kner, 1863)

Synonyms
- Acara coeruleopunctata Kner, 1863; Aequidens coeruleopunctatus (Kner, 1863)

= Andinoacara coeruleopunctatus =

Species of fish

Andinoacara coeruleopunctatus, also known as chogorro and blue-point flag cichlid, is a species of fish in the family Cichlidae. It is found in Central America on both the Atlantic slope of Panama and the Pacific slope of Costa Rica in the Coto River.

== Description ==
Males can reach a length of 14.5 centimetres (5.7 in) total in length.

== Spawning ==
The fish is an open bottom spawner which produces eggs by the hundreds. Both parents care for their eggs and fry until the fry are free-swimming for a week.

== Bibliography ==
- Kullander, S.O., 2003. Cichlidae (Cichlids). pp. 605–654. In R.E. Reis, S.O. Kullander and C.J. Ferraris Jr. (eds.) Checklist of the Freshwater Fishes of South and Central America. Porto Alegre: EDIPUCRS, Brasil.
