= Pantanos de Villa Wildlife Refuge =

Protected area in Lima, Peru

- Refugio de Vida Silvestre Pantanos de Villa
- IUCN category IV (habitat/species management area)
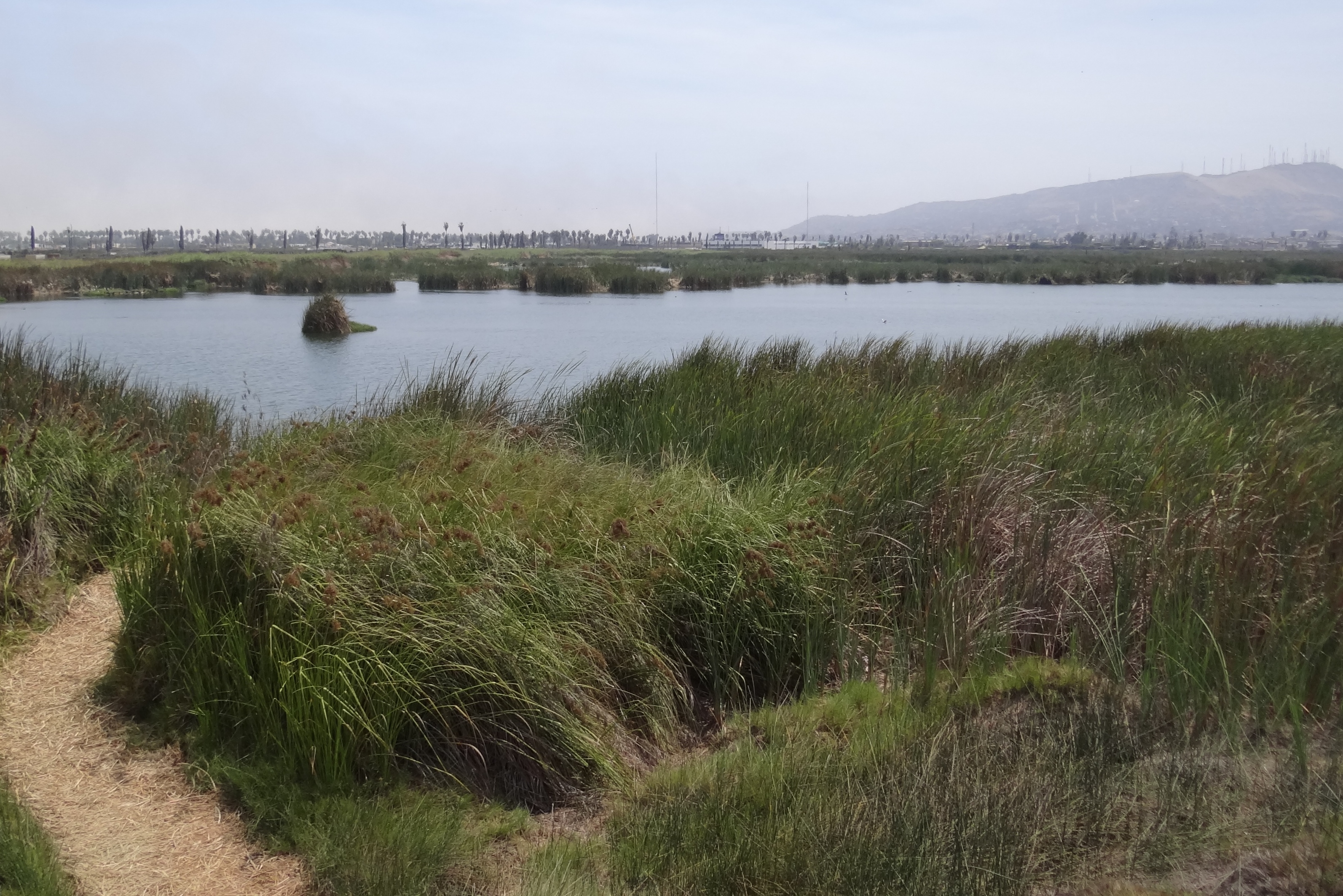
- Marshes at Pantanos de Villa Wildlife Refuge

- Location within Peru
- Location: Peru; Chorrillos, Lima
- Coordinates: 12°12′49″S 76°59′20″W
- Area: 2.63 km^{2} (1.02 sq mi)
- Established: 31 August 2006
- Governing body: SERNANP
- Website: Autoridad Municipal de los Pantanos de Villa; A.M. Pantanos de Villa; Refugio de Vida Silvestre Pantanos de Villa - SERNANP

Ramsar Wetland
- Official name: Refugio de Vida Silvestre Los Pantanos de Villa
- Designated: August 31, 2006
- Reference no.: 884

Pantanos de Villa Wildlife Refuge is a protected area of marshes located in the district of Chorrillos, within the city of Lima, Peru with an extension of 263.27 hectares (2.63 km^{2}).

== History ==
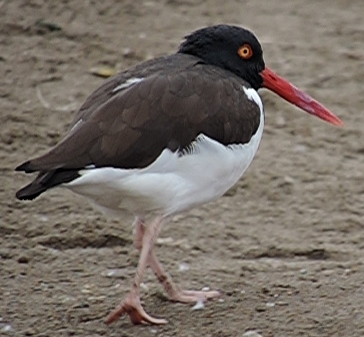
American oystercatcher at Pantanos de Villa.

Since 1977, the Municipality of Lima, through the Lima Parks Service (SERPAR), managed and protected the area.

In 1989, the Ministry of Agriculture declared the area as a wildlife reserve.

In 1993, the Municipality of Lima established the Natural Metropolitan Park of Villa; creating in 1994 a special office for the wildlife reserve with members of the military, the ministry of agriculture and members of the municipalities of Lima and Chorrillos.

In 1997, the reserve was declared a Ramsar site.

In 1998, the municipality issued decrees to strengthen the protection of the reserve, and to manage it through a special governing body named PROHVILLA.

In 2001, the area was declared a reserved zone; and in 2006 it finally reaches the present category of wildlife refuge.

== Geography ==
Pantanos de Villa Wildlife Refuge consists of a series of brackish water lagoons and marshes. These wetlands are formed by the filtration and discharge of water from the Ate-Surco-Chorrillos irrigation canal (which branches off from the Rimac River) and other underground canals. Elevational range inside the protected area goes from 0 to 5 meters above sea level.

== Climate ==
The refuge has a subtropical climate characterized by Austral winters with drizzle, called garua, and high relative humidity (85–99%). Temperatures in winter fluctuate between 14 °C and 19 °C; while in summer, between 15 ° and 26 °C. Annual average precipitation reaches 60 mm.

== Ecology ==
=== Flora ===
These wetlands are located in the Pacific subtropical desert, but are surrounded by urban areas. Some native plant species found in or around the wetlands are: Typha domingensis, Schoenoplectus americanus, Solanum pimpinellifolium, Persicaria hydropiperoides, Sarcocornia sp., Myrsine manglilla, Ludwigia peploides, Wolffia columbiana, Najas guadalupensis, Paspalum vaginatum, Solanum americanum, Ludwigia peruviana, Sagittaria montevidensis, Phyla nodiflora, Lemna minuta, Distichlis spicata, etc.

=== Fauna ===
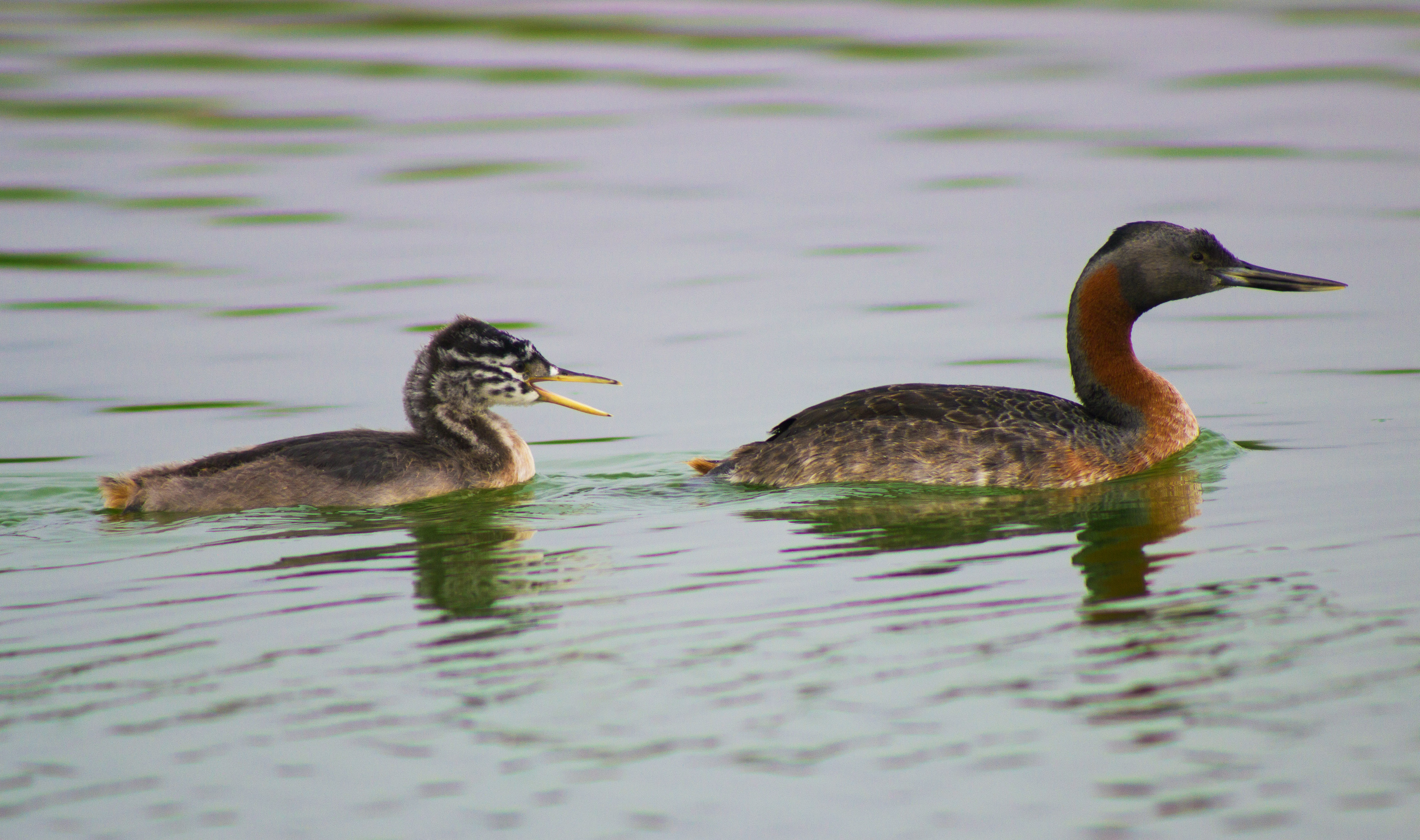
Great grebe at Pantanos de Villa.

A total of 210 bird species are reported in this protected area, but a study conducted between 2004 and 2007 reports 58 species (resident or migrant) with the possibility of finding up to 56 more. Among the birds found in the area are: the white-cheeked pintail, the great grebe, the Andean coot, the Neotropic cormorant, the Peruvian pelican, Franklin's gull, the gray-headed gull, the puna ibis, the black vulture, the Peruvian thick-knee, the black skimmer, the American oystercatcher and Wilson's phalarope.

Among the important native fish in the area are: Bryconamericus peruanus, Lebiasina bimaculata, Mugil cephalus and Andinoacara stalsbergi.

== Activities ==
Birdwatching is the main activity, especially during the summer months (December to March). PROHVILLA, the municipality division that jointly manages the refuge with the government, offers three tourist routes (2 of them of 1 hour, the other one of 45 minutes).

Research is also carried out in the area.

== Environmental issues ==
Current threats to biodiversity in the area are: invasion of lands inside the protected area, chaotic urban growth next to the area, wastewater discharge at nearby areas, industrial plants inside the buffer zone and disappearance and pollution of agricultural canals that feed the marshes (especially the Surco canal).
