= Sturisomatichthys dariensis =

Conservation status
- Endangered (IUCN 3.1)

Scientific classification
- Kingdom: Animalia
- Phylum: Chordata
- Class: Actinopterygii
- Order: Siluriformes
- Family: Loricariidae
- Genus: Sturisomatichthys
- Species: S. dariensis

Binomial name
- Sturisomatichthys dariensis (Meek & Hildebrand, 1913)

Synonyms
- Oxyloricaria dariensis Meek & Hildebrand, 1913; Sturisoma dariense (Meek & Hildebrand, 1913)

Species of fish

Sturisomatichthys dariensis is a species of freshwater ray-finned fish belonging to the family Loricariidae, the suckermouth armored catfishes, and the subfamily Loricariinae, the mailed catfishes. This catfish is endemic to Panama where it occurs in the drainage system#s of the Tuira River. This species attains a maximum length of 25.4 cm (10.0 in) and species in the genus Sturisomatichthys are known to be facultative air breathers.
