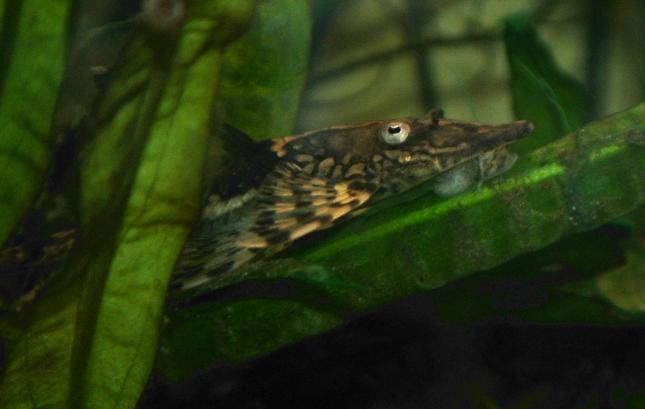
- Sturisomatichthys leightoni

Scientific classification
- Kingdom: Animalia
- Phylum: Chordata
- Class: Actinopterygii
- Order: Siluriformes
- Family: Loricariidae
- Subfamily: Loricariinae
- Genus: Sturisomatichthys; Isbrücker & Nijssen, 1979

Type species
- Oxyloricaria leightoni Regan, 1912

Species
- see text

= Sturisomatichthys =

Genus of fishes

Sturisomatichthys is a genus of freshwater ray-finned fish belonging to the family Loricariidae, the armored suckermouth armored catfishes, and the subfamily Loricariinae, the mailed catfishes. The catfishes in this genus are found in South and Central America.

== Species ==
Sturisomatichthys contains the following valid species:

- Sturisomatichthys aureus (Steindachner, 1900)
- Sturisomatichthys caquetae (Fowler, 1945)
- Sturisomatichthys citurensis (Meek & Hildebrand, 1913)
- Sturisomatichthys dariensis (Meek & Hildebrand, 1913)
- Sturisomatichthys festivus (Myers 1942)
- Sturisomatichthys frenatus (Boulenger, 1902)
- Sturisomatichthys guaitipan Londoño-Burbano & Reis, 2019
- Sturisomatichthys kneri (Ghazzi, 2005)
- Sturisomatichthys leightoni (Regan, 1912)
- Sturisomatichthys panamensis (C. H. Eigenmann & R. S. Eigenmann, 1889)
- Sturisomatichthys reinae Londoño-Burbano & Reis, 2019
- Sturisomatichthys tamanae (Regan, 1912)
- Sturisomatichthys varii Londoño-Burbano & Reis, 2019

== Distribution and habitat ==
The genus Sturisomatichthys is distributed in the northwestern part of South America, on the Pacific and Atlantic slopes of the Andes. The species appear to occupy the same ecological niche as those in Sturisoma.

== Description ==
Sexual dimorphism and reproductive biology of Sturisomatichthys similar to Sturisoma. Sturisomatichthys is distinguished from Sturisoma primarily by the absence of a rostrum. Only one species, S. citurensis, from Panama, seems to be significantly different from all congeneric species in having an abdominal plate cover consisting of small platelets without any particular organization. Other species may represent a species complex with a short snout as in the genus Farlowella with reference to the representatives of the F. curtirostra group. The weakness of this diagnostic feature could lead to the synonymy of Sturisomatichthys with Sturisoma. Sturisomatichthys species grow to about 18–25 centimetres (7.1–9.8 inches) in length.
