= Sturisomatichthys kneri =

Conservation status
- Least Concern (IUCN 3.1)

Scientific classification
- Kingdom: Animalia
- Phylum: Chordata
- Class: Actinopterygii
- Order: Siluriformes
- Family: Loricariidae
- Genus: Sturisomatichthys
- Species: S. kneri

Binomial name
- Sturisomatichthys kneri Ghazzi, 2005

Synonyms
- Sturisoma kneri (Ghazzi, 2005)

Species of armored catfish

Sturisomatichthys kneri is a species of freshwater ray-finned fishbelonging to the family Loricariidae, the suckermouth armored catfishes, and the subfamily Loricariinae, the mailed catfishes. This catfish is endemic to the drainage basin of Lake Maracaibo in Venezuela. This species attains a standard length of 23.9 cm (9.4 in) and species in the genus Sturisomatichthys are known to be facultative air breathers. S. kneri was first formallt described as Sturisoma kneri in 2005 by the Brazilian ichthyologist Miriam S. Ghazzi and its specific name homours the Austrian ichthyologist Rudolf Kner.
