= Sturisomatichthys guaitipan =

Scientific classification
- Kingdom: Animalia
- Phylum: Chordata
- Class: Actinopterygii
- Order: Siluriformes
- Family: Loricariidae
- Genus: Sturisomatichthys
- Species: S. guaitipan

Binomial name
- Sturisomatichthys guaitipan Londoño-Burbano & R. E. dos Reis, 2019

Species of catfish

Sturisomatichthys guaitipan is a species of freshwater ray-finned fish belonging to the family Loricariidae, the suckermouth armored catfishes, and the subfamily Loricariinae, the mailed catfishes. This catfish occurs in the upper and middle Magdalena River basin in Colombia. The species was described in 2019 by Alejandro Londoño-Burbano (of the Federal University of Rio de Janeiro) and Roberto E. Reis (of the Pontifical Catholic University of Rio Grande do Sul) as part of a taxonomic revision of the genus Sturisomatichthys.

== Etymology ==
The fish is named in honor of Gaitana, a cacique of the Timaná people who led resistance to the Spanish in the 16th Century.
