= Sturisomatichthys caquetae =

Conservation status
- Data Deficient (IUCN 3.1)

Scientific classification
- Kingdom: Animalia
- Phylum: Chordata
- Class: Actinopterygii
- Order: Siluriformes
- Family: Loricariidae
- Genus: Sturisomatichthys
- Species: S. caquetae

Binomial name
- Sturisomatichthys caquetae (Fowler, 1945)

Synonyms
- Harttia caquetae Fowler, 1945; Sturisoma caquetae (Fowler, 1945)

Species of fish

Sturisomatichthys caquetae is a species of freshwater ray-finned fish belonging to the family Loricariidae, the suckermouth armored catfishes, and the subfamily Loricariinae, the mailed catfishes. This catfish is endemic to Colombia where it occurs in the Caquetá River basin. This species grows to a length of 19.3 cm (7.6 in).
