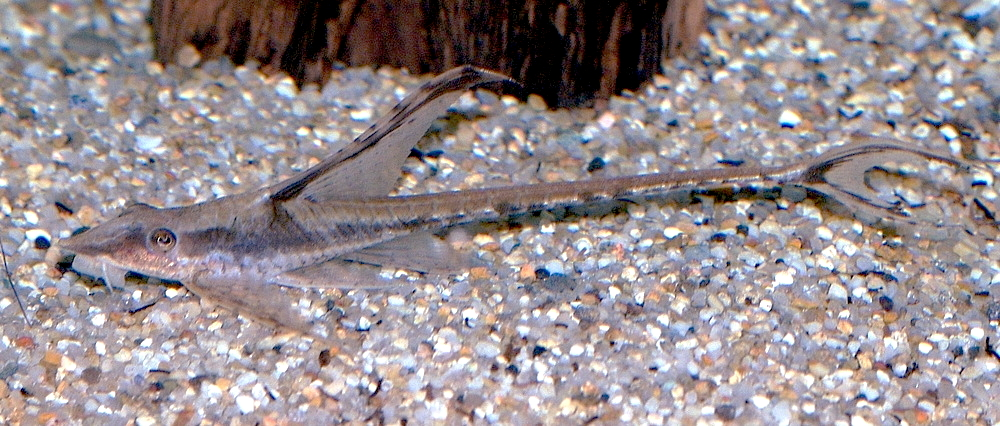

Conservation status
- Least Concern (IUCN 3.1)

Scientific classification
- Kingdom: Animalia
- Phylum: Chordata
- Class: Actinopterygii
- Order: Siluriformes
- Family: Loricariidae
- Genus: Sturisomatichthys
- Species: S. panamensis

Binomial name
- Sturisomatichthys panamensis (C. H. Eigenmann & R. S. Eigenmann, 1889)

Synonyms
- Loricaria panamensis C. H. Eigenmann & R. S. Eigenmann, 1889; Sturisoma panamense (C. H. Eigenmann & R. S. Eigenmann, 1889)

= Sturisomatichthys panamensis =

Species of fish

Sturisomatichthys panamensis is a species of freshwater ray-finned fish belonging to the family Loricariidae, the suckermouth armored catfishes, and the subfamily Loricariinae, the mailed catfishes. This catfish has a wide distribution from the Santa Maria and Tuira River drainages on the Pacific slope of Panama eastward to the Atrato, Sinú and Truando drainages on the Atlantic slope of Colombia. This species attains a standard length of 26 cm (10 in) and species in the genus Sturisomatichthys are known to be facultative air breathers.
