= Sturisomatichthys citurensis =

Conservation status
- Near Threatened (IUCN 3.1)

Scientific classification
- Kingdom: Animalia
- Phylum: Chordata
- Class: Actinopterygii
- Order: Siluriformes
- Family: Loricariidae
- Genus: Sturisomatichthys
- Species: S. citurensis

Binomial name
- Sturisomatichthys citurensis (Meek & Hildebrand, 1913)

Synonyms
- Oxyloricaria citurensis Meek & Hildebrand, 1913

Species of fish

Sturisomatichthys citurensis is a species of freshwater ray-finned fish belonging to the family Loricariidae, the suckermouth armored catfishes, and the subfamily Loricariinae, the mailed catfishes. This catfish is endemic to Panama where it occurs in the drainage systems of the Tuira and Bayano Rivers. There have been claims of this species from Colombia but these are still uncertain. This species attains a standard length of 25 cm (9.8 in) and species in the genus Sturisomatichthys are known to be facultative air breathers.
