= Víctor Andrés García-Belaúnde Velarde =

Peruvian ethicist

- Occupations: Educator, psychologist and ethicist
- Known for: Advocating for secular rationalism in Peru
- Board member of: Secular Humanist Society of Peru

Academic background
- Education: Australian National University
- Thesis: ¿Tenemos el derecho de cambiar la naturaleza humana? La objeción de 'jugar a ser dios' en ingeniería genética

Academic work
- Discipline: Psychology
- Sub-discipline: Ethics, philosophy of science, epistemology and theory of science, and deontology
- Institutions: Universidad San Ignacio de Loyola; Universidad Científica del Sur

Víctor Andrés García-Belaúnde Velarde (born 1977) is a Peruvian educator, psychologist and ethicist. He is a prominent advocate for secular rationalism in Peru, an otherwise highly traditional and religious country, and is active across various media. He currently leads the Manzana Escéptica, a program for the popularization of science in La Mula TV, and is a panelist on Guía Escéptica, Peru's first podcast on skepticism, rationality and science. He is a professor at San Ignacio de Loyola University and at Universidad Científica del Sur in Lima, Peru, where he researches and teaches in ethics, philosophy of science, epistemology and theory of science, and deontology, respectively.

== Education ==
García-Belaúnde graduated cum laude in psychology from University of Lima. He obtained two Masters, the first in History of Philosophy at the National University of San Marcos, and the second in Professional and Applied Ethics at the Australian National University, where he graduated with distinction for his thesis on the moral viability of genetic engineering in humans.

== Other notable public activities ==
García-Belaúnde is co-founder and executive director of the Secular Humanist Society of Peru. He has also published several articles on human nature and science communication from a psychological and philosophical perspective. He has been a panelist on educational programs for Radio Union, Radio Miraflores and RPP. Previously, he was a regular panelist on Radio Canto Grande 'Para-normales de la noche', the first radio program to raise awareness of skepticism in Peru.

He was awarded with the Go Harlem Brudtland Award for his work on Manzana Escéptica, which deals with the discussion of ideas considered to be true for most, but false for science.

He also has published the book Crítica de las interacciones del alma: Una aproximación aristotélica y cartesiana a partir de la ciencia normal in which criticizes the animistic explanations of Aristotelian hilmorphism and the Cartesian dualism from a naturalistic perspective. In the first chapter he explores the Aristotelian writings on the soul and the Aristotelian interactions of the soul with matter. In the second chapter he contrasts the functioning of the Aristotelian agent and patient intellect with the findings of cognitive psychology and cybernetic systems. In the third chapter he examines the Aristotelian postulates about incontinence and then addresses the problems concerning power and action in moral decisions. The fourth chapter deals with the Cartesian interactions of the soul with the body. There the validity of the relations between the soul, the passions and the animal spirits will be questioned. The fifth chapter maintains that it is not necessary to create an immaterial entity to explain the psychic phenomena. It also discusses body-body interactions, eliminating the intermediate entity (soul). Finally, he briefly recounts the evolution of material interactions (body-body) to consciousness according to normal science.
