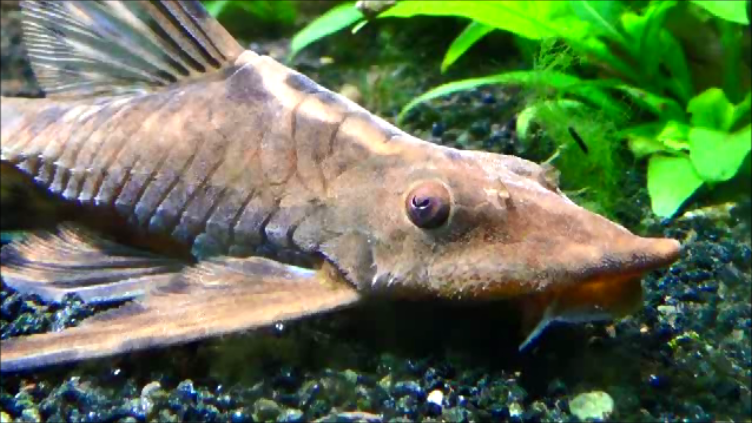

Conservation status
- Least Concern (IUCN 3.1)

Scientific classification
- Kingdom: Animalia
- Phylum: Chordata
- Class: Actinopterygii
- Order: Siluriformes
- Family: Loricariidae
- Genus: Sturisomatichthys
- Species: S. festivus

Binomial name
- Sturisomatichthys festivus (Myers, 1942)

Synonyms
- Sturisoma festivum Myers. 1942

= Sturisomatichthys festivus =

Species of fish

Sturisomatichthys festivus is a species of freshwater ray-finned fish belonging to the family Loricariidae, the suckermouth armored catfishes, and the subfamily Loricariinae, the mailed catfishes. This catfish is occurs in the drainage basin of Lake Maracaibo in Colombia and Venezuela. This species attains a standard length of 16.9 cm (6.7 in) and species in the genus Sturisomatichthys are known to be facultative air breathers.
