= Tumbes River =

River in Peru and Ecuador

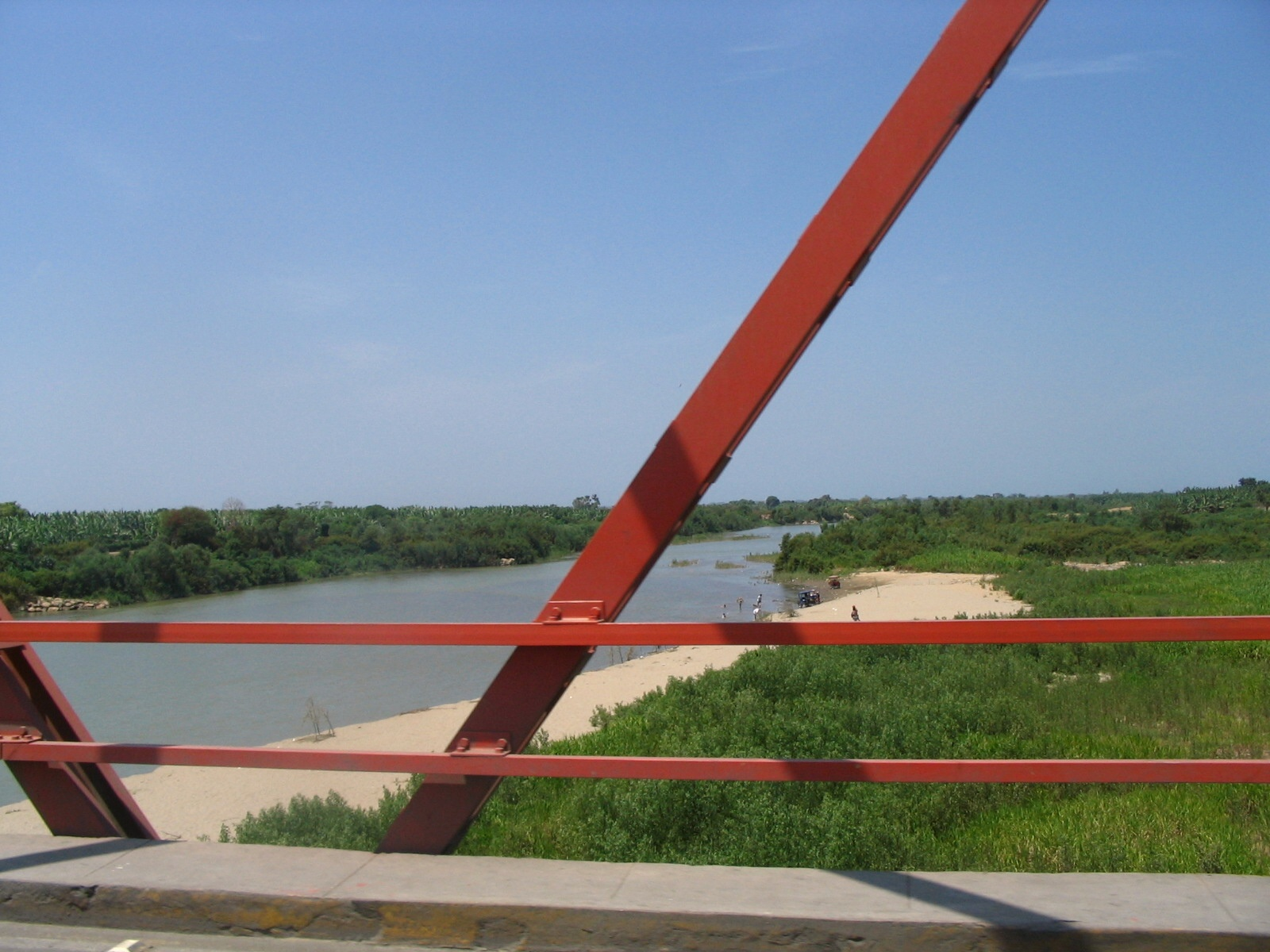
- View of the river from a bridge in Tumbes, Peru

- Location of mouth

Location
- Country: Peru, Ecuador

Physical characteristics
- Mouth
  - coordinates: 03°29′24″S 80°25′30″W

The Tumbes River (Spanish: Río Tumbes or Río Túmbez in Peru; Río Puyango in Ecuador), is a river in South America. The river's sources are located between Ecuadorian El Oro and Loja provinces. It is the border between El Oro and Loja, and afterwards the border between Loja and the Tumbes Region in Peru. At its confluence with the Cazaderos stream, it enters the northern coastal region of Peru called the Tumbes Region, and flows into the Pacific Ocean outside the Gulf of Guayaquil. The largest city on its banks is Tumbes, Peru.

== Fauna ==
=== Fish ===
- Andinoacara rivulatus - The Green Terror Cichlid.
