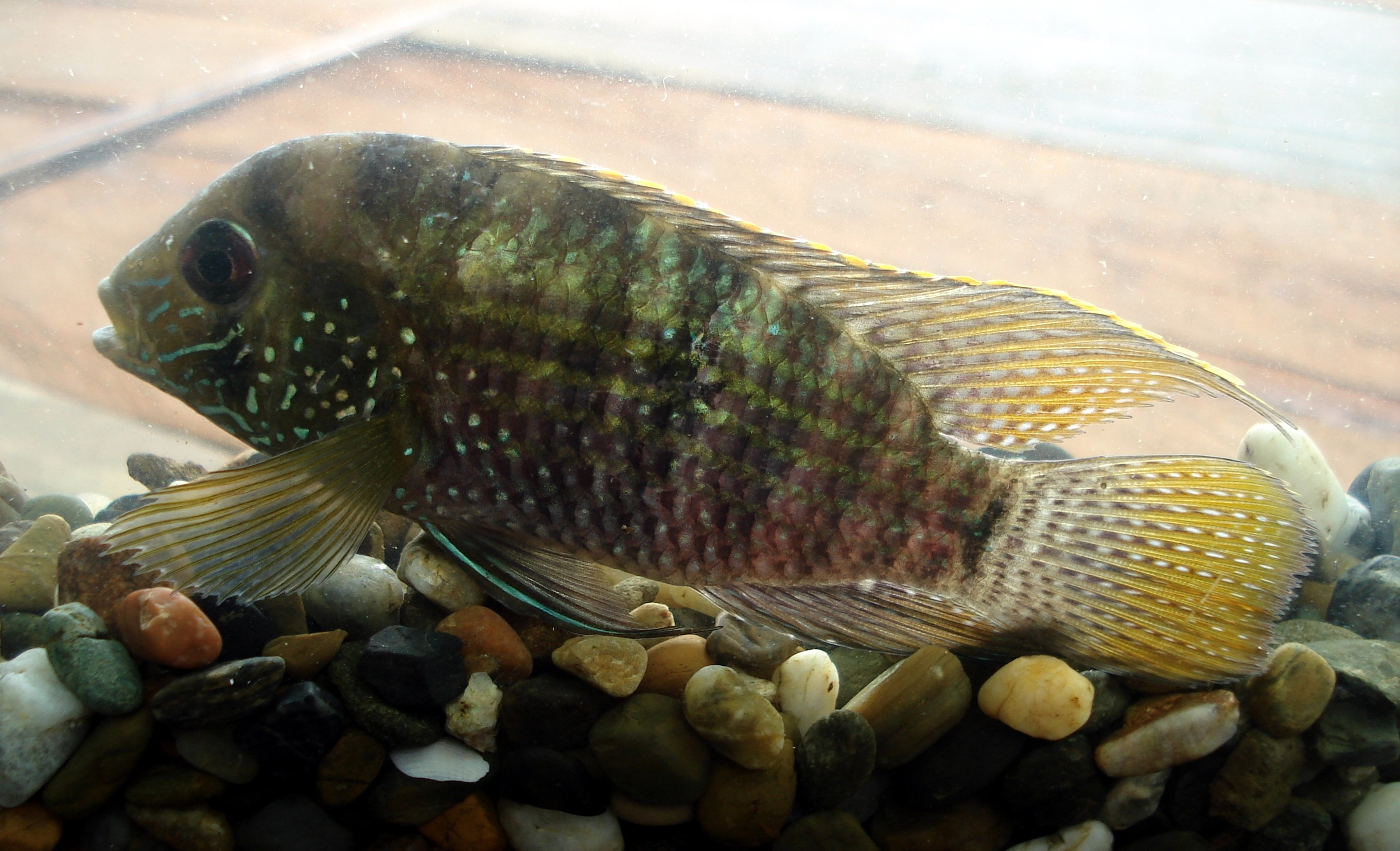

Conservation status
- Least Concern (IUCN 3.1)

Scientific classification
- Kingdom: Animalia
- Phylum: Chordata
- Class: Actinopterygii
- Order: Cichliformes
- Family: Cichlidae
- Genus: Andinoacara
- Species: A. latifrons

Binomial name
- Andinoacara latifrons (Steindachner, 1878)

Synonyms
- Acara latifrons Steindachner, 1878; Aequidens latifrons (Steindachner, 1878)

= Andinoacara latifrons =

Species of fish

Andinoacara latifrons, the platinum acara, is a species of fish in the family Cichlidae in the order Perciformes, native to the Magdalena, Atrato, Sinú, and San Juan River basins in Colombia. The scientific species name is indicative to its looks; latifrons meaning "broad forehead" or "broad front" in Latin.

== Description ==
Males can reach a length of 17 centimetres (6.7 in) total in length. It has a stocky body with a bluish-grey colouration. It has lighter speckles across the scales, with relatively long fins. It is similar in appearance to the blue acara.

== Spawning ==
The platinum acara spawns several times each year. As with most cichlids there are many frequent quarrels between partners. The female cleans a stone carefully and lays eggs on it afterward. They are attached to one another, resembling a pearl necklace. As they begin to increase in size the stone is completely covered by them. The female fans them with her body and pectoral fins. Once the fry have emerged and can swim independently they surround their parents in a great shoal.

== Bibliography ==
- Arai, R. y H. Kobayasi, 1973. A chromosome study on thirteen species of Japanese gobiid fishes. Jap. J. Ichthyol. 20(1):1–6.
- McDowall, R.M., 1988. Diadromy in fishes: migrations between freshwater and marine environments. Croom Helm, Londres.
- Riede, K., 2004. Global register of migratory species – from global to regional scales. Final Report of the R&D-Projekt 808 05 081. Federal Agency for Nature Conservation, Bonn, Alemania. 329 p.
- Vasil'ev, V.P., 1980. Chromosome numbers in fish-like vertebrates and fish. J. Ichthyol. 20(3): 1–38.
- Wu, H.L., K.-T. Shao y C.F. Lai (eds.), 1999. Latin-Chinese dictionary of fishes names. The Sueichan Press, Taiwan.
- Yamazaki, Y., S. Haramoto y T. Fukasawa, 2006. Habitat uses of freshwater fishes on the scale of reach system provided in small streams. Environ. Biol. Fish. 75:333–341.
