= Andinoacara stalsbergi =

Scientific classification
- Kingdom: Animalia
- Phylum: Chordata
- Class: Actinopterygii
- Division: Teleostei
- Order: Cichliformes
- Family: Cichlidae
- Genus: Andinoacara
- Species: A. stalsbergi

Binomial name
- Andinoacara stalsbergi Musilová, Schindler & Staeck, 2009

Species of fish

Andinoacara stalsbergi is a species of South American freshwater fish in the family Cichlidae. It was previously included in A. rivulatus, but was described as a separate species in 2009. The specific name honours the Norwegian aquarist Alf Stalsberg who collected the type of this species and who has had a "longstanding commitment to increase the knowledge about cichlid fishes".

A. stalsbergi has scales on the body with light centres and dark edges, and narrow clearly defined white edging to the tail and dorsal fins. This separates it from A. rivulatus where the scale-pattern is reversed, and the fin-edging is gold-orange or less clearly defined white. A. stalsbergi are found in rivers and other freshwater habitats in western Peru from Piura to Ica, while A. rivulatus are found in far northwestern Peru (Tumbes) and western Ecuador.

Although the largest officially measured A. stalsbergi only had a standard length of 11.3 cm (4.4 in), it is known to reach a size comparable to A. rivulatus.

== In the aquarium ==
=== Temperament ===
A. stalsbergi live up to the name aquarium trade name green terror. They are not as aggressive as the species Mesoheros festae, known in the trade as the red terror.

=== Sexing ===
As with most cichlids, venting is the most reliable method for sexing when young. The males will develop a nuchal hump from around the first year.

=== Water conditions ===
They prefer a temperature in the range 20–24 °C (68–75 °F) with a dH of 5-12 and a pH of 6.5-8.0.

=== Breeding ===
Male green terrors are sexually mature at 10 centimetres (3.9 in) and females at 8 cm (3.1 in). Although spawning below these sizes is possible, few eggs hatch.

It requires suitable breeding sites, such as flat rocks. The pair cleans the site before breeding. The female Green terror can deposit up to 300-400 eggs, while some produce more than 600 eggs.

They are protective of their eggs. For this reason, breeding should take place in a separate tank. The eggs hatch after 3–4 days. Adults continue to guard and care for the larvae, moving the fry into pits in the substrate. At this stage, the larvae can be fed crushed flakes. After 9–12 days, the fry are big enough to swim freely. They are highly sensitive to poor water conditions and succumb absent regular water changes. Free swimming fry eat brine shrimp or fine fry powder. When the fry have reached a length of 2 cm (0.8 in) they typically experience a growth spurt and rapidly grow bigger.

To increase brood sizes, once the pair start to clean a rock, separate the male and female with a divider for 3–5 days, increase the temperature by 5-7 °C (about 8-12 °F), perform a 50% water change and feed with live food (such as bloodworm).
