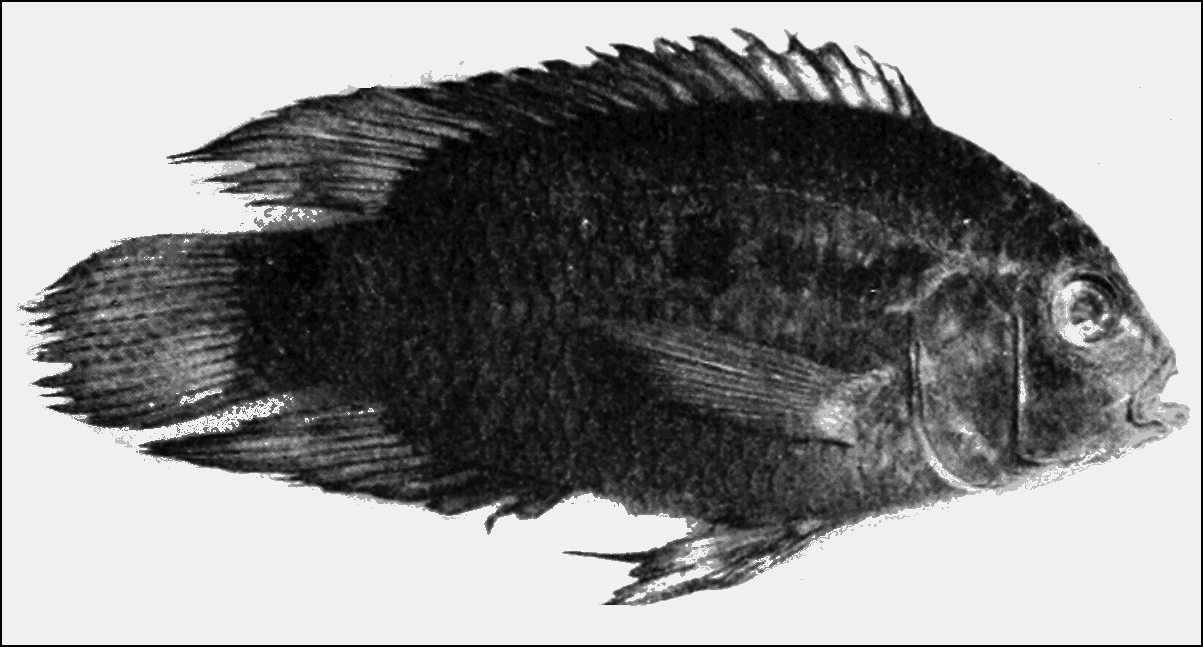
- Adult C. bimaculatum.

Scientific classification
- Kingdom: Animalia
- Phylum: Chordata
- Class: Actinopterygii
- Division: Teleostei
- Order: Cichliformes
- Family: Cichlidae
- Genus: Cichlasoma
- Species: C. bimaculatum

Binomial name
- Cichlasoma bimaculatum (Linnaeus, 1758)

Synonyms
- Labrus bimaculatus Linnaeus, 1758; Acara gronovii Heckel, 1840; Sparus filamentosus Gronow, 1854

= Cichlasoma bimaculatum =

Species of fish

The black acara (Cichlasoma bimaculatum) is an omnivorous, freshwater, tropical fish. The species originates from South America, specifically in the Caroni River in the Orinoco Basin of Venezuela, Essequibo River in Guyana, and the Branco River drainage of the Amazon Basin. However, the black acara species has been accidentally introduced to numerous other areas within Florida's southern peninsula.

The species was first described in 1758 by Swedish biologist Carl Linnaeus.

== Characteristics and behavior ==
Cichlasoma bimaculatum has distinguishable characteristics. The black acara has a dark beige to gray back with a dirty white underbelly. It has a stout forebody, more compressed posterior body, and is oval to slightly rectangular in shape. The black body is beige to gray with an asymmetrically spotted caudal fin, and four anal spines. A black to green-gray strip extends from the eye through a mid-lateral spot, and then extends to a black spot at the upper caudal fin base. A dark blotch is present below the eye, and this species has a small and terminal mouth. Black rimming along the scale edges is narrow and even, although this feature may be absent in some individuals. The black acara only show bright coloring when living or held in optimal settings, such as the wild or proper aquariums. Fish of this species held in non-desirable conditions and experiencing traumatic situations will often present a very pale coloring. Though conflicting details exist regarding the sexual dimorphism of the black acara, females are more plump than males with a visible ovipositor. Another difference is that the males have more tapering, as well as a straight belly during the spawn.

Black acara frequent shallow, stagnant, roadside ditches or similarly disturbed habitats that normally contain few other fishes. They are frequently present in larger canals and lakes. The black acara do not live individually, normally they live as a couple or can be found in groups. With survival instincts, both the parents will guard their young until they are sexually mature, which is at about four inches in size. The maximum size can reach about eight inches, which can weigh about four ounces. Each spawning event consists of an average of about 1,000 eggs. One of the major ways that the fish are analyzed is when they are deceased. During these examinations, the stomachs were focused on. Half of the stomachs showed aquatic insects, plant material, snails, and detritus.

== Diet ==
Cichlasoma bimaculatum is a generalist omnivore with scavenger like qualities, consuming small crustaceans and insect larvae in addition to small fishes. The black acara provide more competition for the native sunfish within spawning areas and have the ability to impact both invertebrate and plant communities through predation. In the wild, the black acara is not typically finicky with the food it consumes. Often, the black acara will consume crustaceans, insects, and worms present in the same habitat.

== Habitat and range ==
The first reported introduction of Cichlasoma bimaculatum to a new habitat was the introduction to Florida in 1965. Florida is the only state with a reported nonindigenous occurrence, including confirmed sightings in Big Cypress Swamp, the Everglades, and Lake Okeechobee. They are also found in creeks, lakes, canals, drainage ditches and wet prairies. Factors influential to black acara's successful establishment in Florida includes warm waters, and, in some areas slow water current. To avoid predation, the black acara desires habitats such as lakes and canals with rocky bottoms to blend in. The black acaras spread throughout the state are also successful because of its year-round breeding cycle and ability to withstand low oxygen levels as well as high fecundity.

The tropical black acara fish is a resident of equatorial South America, unlike the chanchita. Even though the two species appear remarkably identical, the subtropical chanchita doesn't inhabit waters north of southern Brazil. Researchers suggest that since the chanchita is more cold-tolerant, it may have a more widespread effect in Florida than the black acara and could endanger native plants in habitats in North Central Florida. It lives in seven different counties and five other drainages of rivers in Florida, well beyond Tampa Bay's drainage, where it was first introduced.

== Reproduction ==
The spawning location is usually a flat surface such as logs, gravel, broad-leaved, and more rigid plants, which in an aquarium setting can be the aquarium's glass. The female acara lays the eggs, and the male fertilizes them soon after. Soon after, the pair will take care of the nest oxygenating the eggs, eliminate the fungi that are not fertilized or invaded, and remove any approaching predators. For home aquariums, to reduce tension in the aquarium community, a different tank is recommended for breeding. The eggs hatch in around 24-48 hours, the fry then feed on the yolk sac in the first 3-5 days after hatching and begin swimming close to their parents at the end of this time. From this point on in the fishes growth and life, live food can be given according to the size of the young. Examples of live food include, artemia nauplii, shelled artemia larvae, infusoria, and unique oviparous fry rations. After a month after birth the young will isolate themselves from their parents. However, the young will isolate as soon as the parent and young stop and avoid showing interest in one another.

== Possible benefits and threats ==
One threat the black acara poses to the Florida habitats is that it could have negative effects on native fishes in that they had early success and increase in size and were thought to have possibly out competed and overrun the habitats. Black acaras are also known to be very territorial, reacting aggressively to any fish within their proximity and can defend nesting sites in all but the coldest months of the year. Specifically, the black acara are considered a competitor with the native sunfish in terms of spawning areas. Early success of this fish in Florida led to an erroneous conclusion that it would have significant negative effects on native fishes. However, one benefit the black acara has on the habitat is that they are not able to compete with the native fishes therefore they don't pose a threat in the use of resources or area. Often, the native fishes are larger than the black acara, therefore they can be consumed.

== Fishery ==
The black acara species is a desirable sporting fish, especially for children. Considering the species is small enough to handle and lightweight it makes it great for sport quality. When fishing, a lightweight tackle should be used with the smallest hook possible. To find the black acara, any body of water that contains large amounts of algae will be the best place to fish. With this, they often stay closer to the shallow parts of water to avoid bigger predators like catfish. To catch a black acara, bread, bloodworms, or dough can be put at the end of the hook to catch a bite. Once caught, the black acara will continuously jump and flop around until a firm grip has been placed on them. Once properly and safely gripped, the hook can be removed without worry of harming the fish and they can be placed back in the water.

== Mitigation and control ==
Mitigation and control for the invasive black acara are lacking. There are no known control programs established for the black acara. However, to document and for future population control, it is encouraged that sightings are reported to local authorities. However, it is known that the black acara cannot survive in cold water temperatures. The lethal temperature for black acara is 8.9 °C. Therefore, natural and established invasive populations are natural bound by ambient water temperature.
