= Achara Takipur =

Coordinates: 27.4451°N 79.3075°E

Achara, also rendered as Achara Takipur is a town in Farrukhabad district in the Indian State of Uttar Pradesh. Achara is connected to all the major cities of north India by roads. Kaimganj is a nearest railway station. Kaimganj Railway Station is a major station between Farrukhabad and Kasganj on Rajputana railway link of North Eastern Railway.

== Description ==
Achara is situated between Lat. 27°26'41"N and Long 79°18'35"E. The Ganges River and Ramganga River are located to the north and the Kali River to the south. It is 12 km from Kaimganj and 30 km from Farrukhabad. Achratakipur is one of the villages of block Kaimganj, in Farrukhabad district of Uttar Pradesh.
