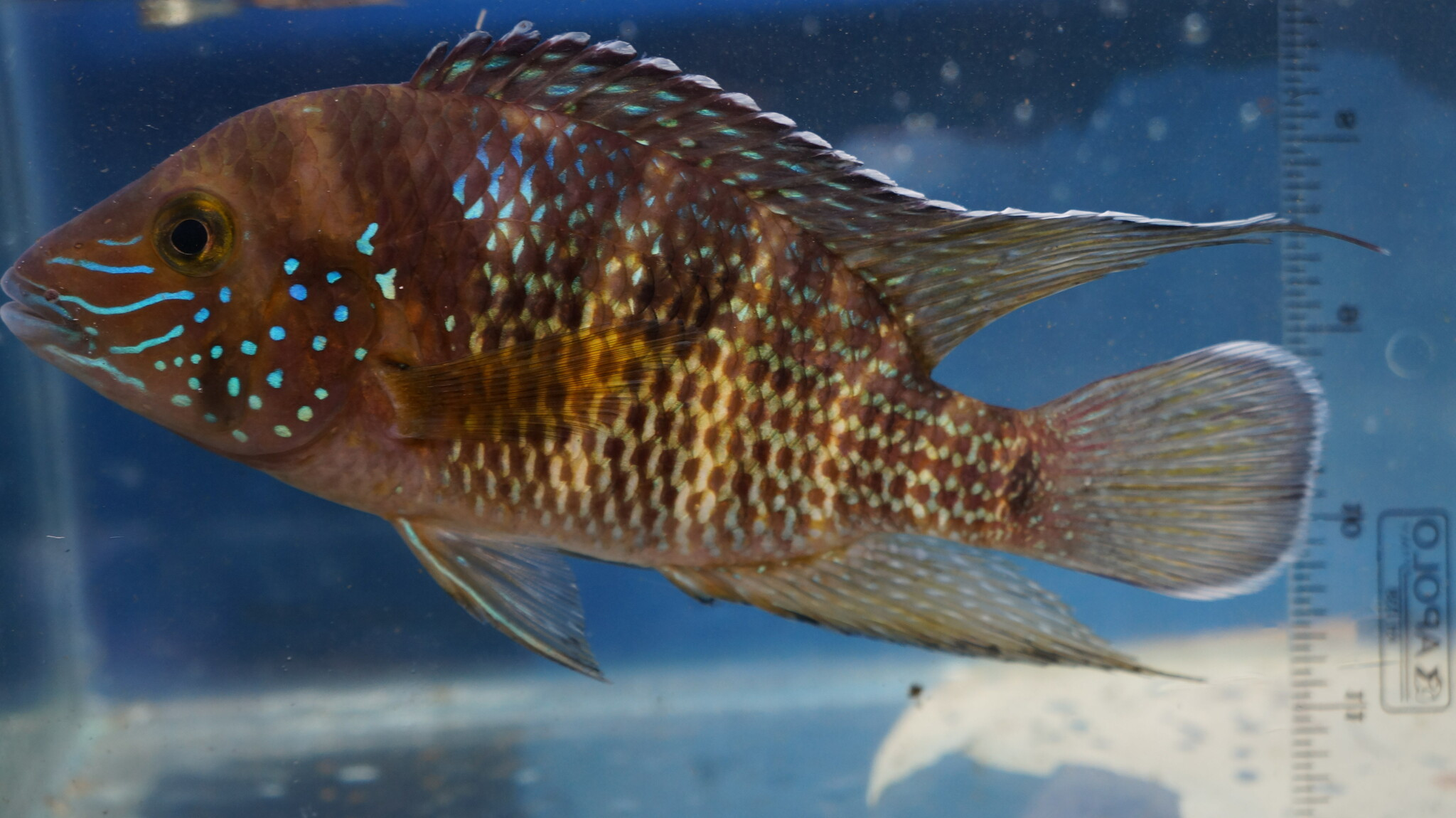

Conservation status
- Least Concern (IUCN 3.1)

Scientific classification
- Kingdom: Animalia
- Phylum: Chordata
- Class: Actinopterygii
- Division: Teleostei
- Order: Cichliformes
- Family: Cichlidae
- Genus: Andinoacara
- Species: A. blombergi

Binomial name
- Andinoacara blombergi Wijkmark, S. O. Kullander & Barriga S., 2012

= Andinoacara blombergi =

Species of fish

Andinoacara blombergi is a species of fish in the family Cichlidae. It is found on the South American Pacific slope, in the Esmeraldas River drainage in north-western Ecuador.

== Etymology ==
The fish is named for Rolf Blomberg (1912–1996) because of his expeditions in Ecuador.

== Description ==
Males can reach a length of 10.7 centimetres (4.2 in) total in length.

== Behaviour and ecology ==
The fish is an egglayer.
