= Cayapas River =

River in Ecuador

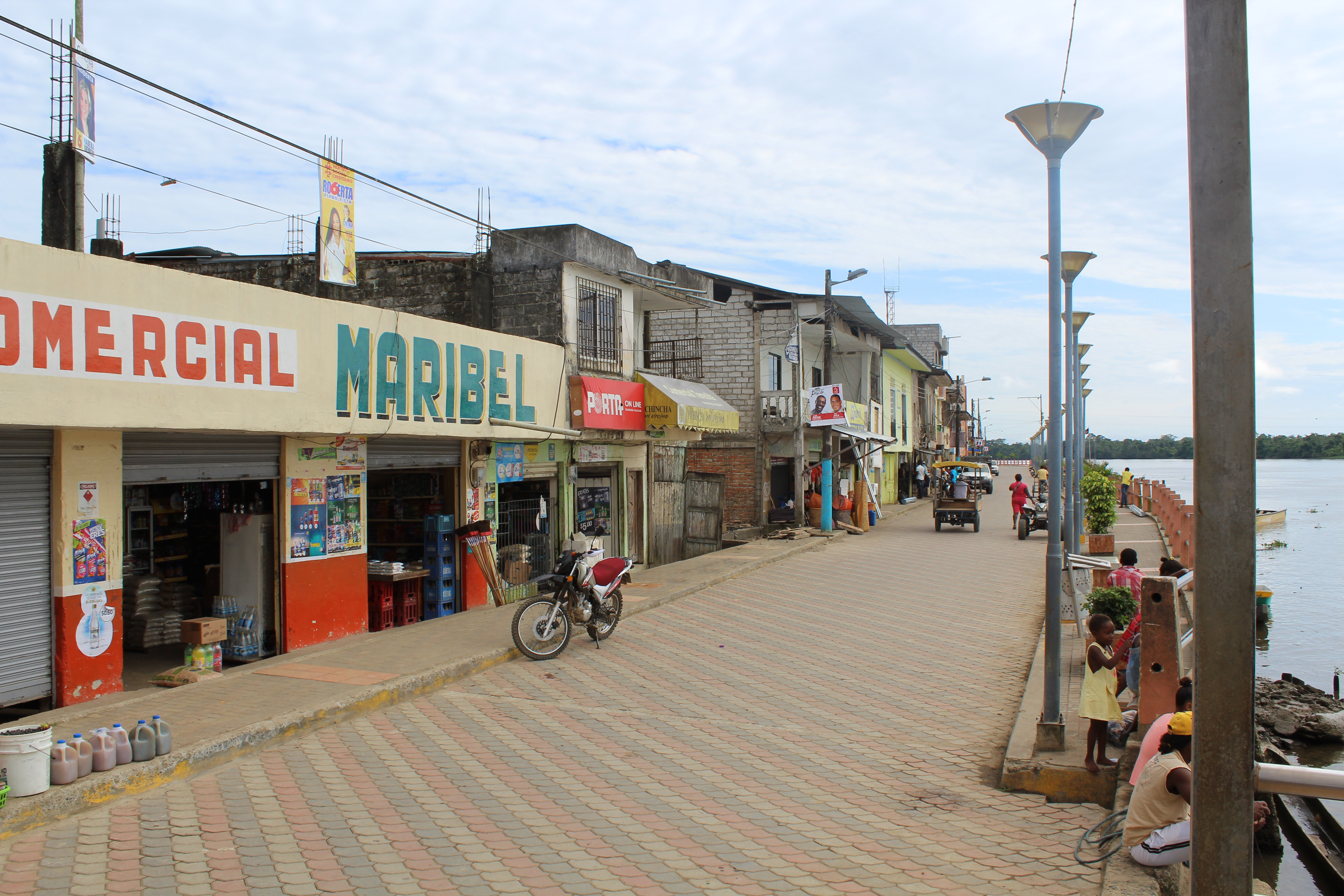
- Near the confluence with the Santiago River

- Location of mouth

Location
- Country: Ecuador

Physical characteristics
- Mouth
  - coordinates: 1°13′50″N 79°02′43″W

The Cayapas River is in northern Ecuador, flowing northward from the Andes and emptying into the Pacific Ocean near San Lorenzo. The Santiago River is a principal tributary.

== Fauna ==
=== Fish ===
- Andinoacara sapayensis - A Cichlid.

== See also ==
- List of rivers of Ecuador
