= Repent Amarillo =

American Christian activist group

Repent Amarillo, also known as "God and Country" or "Last Front Evangelist", is a small Amarillo, Texas-based group which advocated for the spiritual mapping and targeting of specific local areas and venues in order to exorcise demons from those areas. Because of the group's alleged tactics and targeting of perceivably-vulnerable minorities, the group has gained infamy from many critics who label the organization as a "hate group" or a "Christian" analogy for the Lebanese militant group Hezbollah (lit. 'Party of God').

The group was led by former Department of Energy security guard David Grisham.

== Activities ==
Among the number of notable actions and campaigns taken by the group include protests against supposed swingers, LGBT people, abortion clinics, Muslims, Buddhists, Wiccans, Episcopalians, Methodists, Greek Orthodox, Roman Catholics, and a myriad of other groups.

=== Boycott against Houston, Texas ===
In January 2010, the group launched a boycott campaign against the city of Houston, Texas, due to the election of openly gay mayor Annise Parker and the construction of an abortion clinic in the city.

== Theological controversy ==
The group is a source of debate within Christian circles whom disagree with or reject the doctrine of spiritual mapping and territorial spirits, among other doctrinal issues.

== Amarillo Citizens against Repent Amarillo ==
Amarillo Citizens against Repent Amarillo, also known by the acronym ACARA, is the counter-movement to Repent Amarillo. They are protesters made up of Christians, Muslims, Jews, Buddhists and atheists who gathered at Sam Houston Park in order to challenge Grisham's plan to burn the Quran on a grill (the book had been doused with kerosene). While Grisham was arguing with a group of women that placed their hands on the grill asking if he would burn them too, it was when Grisham lit his lighter anyway that a 23-year-old named Jacob Isom snuck up from behind him, grabbed the Quran from Grisham's hands, and ran off after saying, "Dude, you have no Quran"; afterwards, Isom handed the book to a religious leader from the Islamic Center of Amarillo. Isom was presented with a "Medal of Reasonableness" at the Rally to Restore Sanity and/or Fear for his action. He immediately threw the medal into the crowd.

Of notable mention is the wide range of classes ACARA has within its ranks. Two well-known members ran for Mayor of Amarillo, contesting Grisham every step of the way. Cory "Grady" Traves is the head of ACARA's Peace Keepers detail, responsible for keeping the peace at the David Grisham for Mayor Rally.

== Westgate Mall incident ==
In December 2016, Grisham accosted a group of children and their parents who were waiting to see Santa Claus at Westgate Mall.

== See also ==
- Spiritual warfare
