= Scientific University of the South =

Private university in Lima, Peru

Universidad Científica del Sur
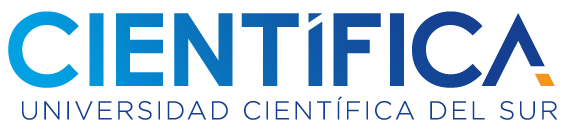
- Motto: Mejoras tú. Mejora el mundo. (Spanish)
- Motto in English: You improve. The world improves.
- Type: Private
- Established: 5 February 1997
- Founder: José Carlos Dextre Chacón
- President: Eng. José Carlos Dextre
- Rector: Dr. Manuel Efraín Rosemberg Barrón
- Students: 16,352 (2017)
- Undergraduates: 15,869
- Postgraduates: 483
- Location: Carr. Panamericana Sur km 19, Chorrillos, Lima, Peru; 12.2208°S 76.9784°W
- Campus: Urban, 10.00 hectares (24.71 acres) (Campus Villa : Antigua Panamericana Sur. Km. 19.) Urban, (Post-Graduate School: Av. Arequipa 4861, Miraflores, Lima)
- Colours: Blue; Yellow
- Website: cientifica.edu.pe

The Universidad Científica del Sur or Scientific University of the South (UCSUR) is a private institution of higher education, located at 19 km south from the city of Lima, nearby Pantanos de Villa Reserved Zone. The university was founded and recognized in 1997 by education representatives, led by José Carlos Dextre. It started activities by offering Medicine and Systems Engineering programmes. Their curriculum was characterized by personalized education and early introduction to the career.

The university had presented an important growth in population and in academic offer. Today, it has 18 bachelor and 13 master's degrees programmes, as well as several specialization courses.

== History ==
In 1996, education representatives, under the guidance of José Carlos Dextre, accorded to establish a new university. On February 5, 1998, the National Council on the Functioning of Universities (CONAFU), approved the start of activities of Universidad Científica del Sur by Resolution N° 356-98-CONAFU. The Organizing Committee had Dr. Fernando Cabieses Molina as president. Later, he would become the first Rector. Eng. José Carlos Dextre was assigned as the board president. Dr. José Chacón Polar, a distinguished Peruvian doctor, was appointed as vice-president of academics.

The opening ceremony was on March 29, 1998, at Pedro de Osma's Museum. By July 12, the admission summon began and in September the academic activities started. The first semester consisted in fifty students, which were spread in the Medical and Systems Engineering schools.

In 2007, after 10 years leading the university, Dr. Fernando Cabieses Molina resigned as rector. The former Dean of Medicine, Dr. Agustín Iza, replaced him in the post.

In 2013, Fernando Cabieses Molina Research Hall was inaugurated to honor the first rector of the university. In August, Dr. José Amiel Pérez was assigned as rector.

For 15 years, the university had experience an important growth. Today, it offers 18 undergraduate degrees to 2,000 students. In addition, the post-graduate school has 13 master's degrees and several specialization courses. Since 2011, the university has started a process to shift every school and administration office to Campus Villa, nearby Pantanos de Villa Reserved Zone.

== Organization ==
=== Authorities ===
==== Board president ====
The board president is the executive head of the university.

- Eng. José Carlos Dextre

==== Rectors ====
The rector is the academic head of the university and acts as the main representative of the institution.

- Dr. Manuel Efraín Rosemberg Barrón: Rector 2018 - Incumbent.
- Dr. Josefina Takahashi: Rector 2015 - 2018.
- Dr. José Amiel Pérez: Rector 2013 - 2015.
- Dr. Agustín Iza Stoll: Rector 2007 - 2012.
- Dr. Fernando Cabieses Molina (Rector Emeritus): Rector 1998 - 2007

=== Careers ===
==== Health sciences ====
- Medicine
- Stomatology
- Nutrition
- Psychology
- Veterinary and husbandry

==== Environmental sciences ====
- Environmental engineering and management
- Engineering in forest and agronomic business
- Marine biology and ecological business
- Architecture and environmental urbanism

==== Business ====
- Engineering in business systems
- Economic and business engineering
- International business administration
- Business administration
- Marketing and administration
- Communications and advertising
- sustainable tourism and hotel management
- Law

==== Humanities ====
- Performing arts

=== Academic year ===
The academic year has two semesters. Each semester has 18 weeks and most courses are designed to be completed in that period. An exception to this rule is applied in the school of medicine, where several courses exceed the stated period. The first semester runs between April and July. The second semester follows between August and December. Nevertheless, several courses can be taken in the summer.

== Infrastructure ==
=== Campus ===
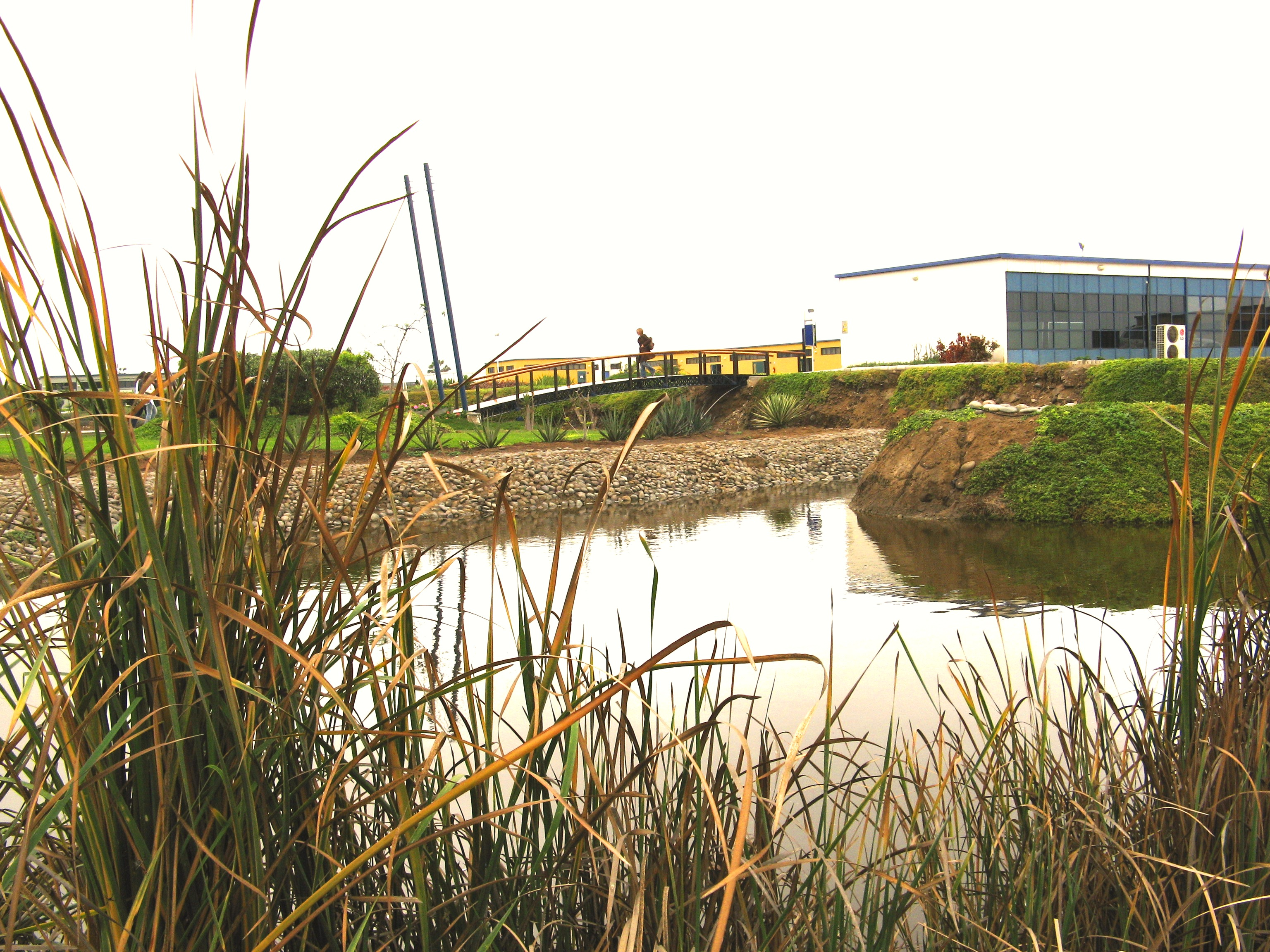
Campus Villa 1 Bridge.

Most academic and administrative activities are performed in Campus Villa. The campus is settled near Pantanos de Villa Reserved Zone and has approximately 100,000 m^{2}. It is divided in four sections: Villa 1, Villa 2, Villa 3 and Villa 6.

Campus Villa 1 construction started in 1998. For many years it was established for the use of sciences schools (Medicine, Nutrition, Stomatology, Veterinary and Husbandry). At present, Fernando Cabieses Molina Research Hall, the Main Library, administrative offices and the auditorium are based in its area.

Campus Villa 2 has its origin in a sport field inaugurated in 2008. Soon after, several halls were built in the area. Simultaneously, Campus Villa 3 was constructed. By the time the construction ended, every faculty shifted their activities to Campus Villa.

Campus Villa 6 lies nearby the coast. The husbandry unit is settled in an area of 15,000 m^{2}.

The university supplies a transport service for students and personnel from Lima to Campus Villa. For transportation of students inside the campus, the university provides bicycles.

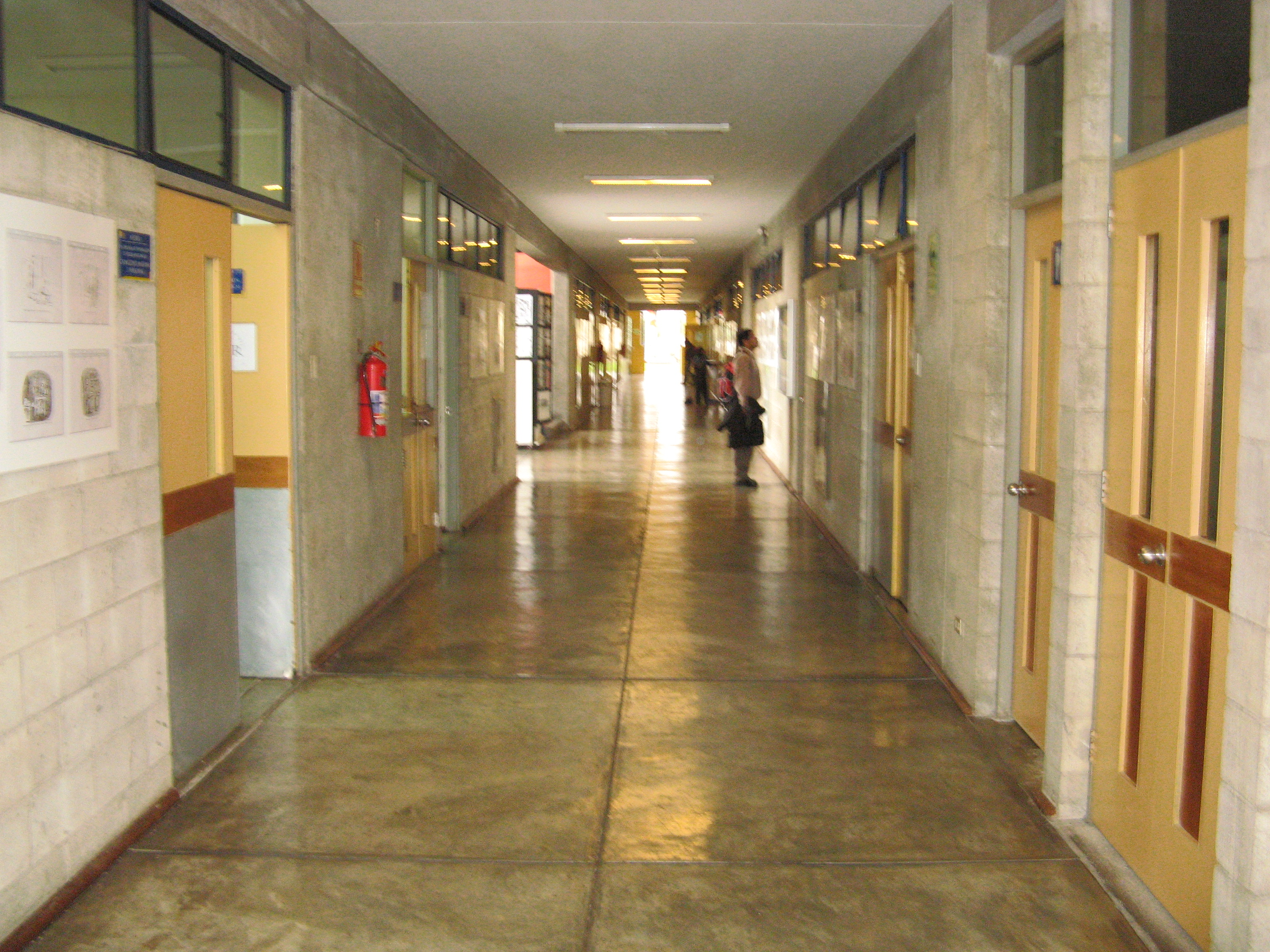
Former Hall A, 2009 - Campus Villa 1

=== Fernando Cabieses Molina Research Hall ===
The former Hall A was equipped, remodeled and re-inaugurated in 2013 as "Fernando Cabieses Molina" Research Hall. The building stands as the mainstay of scientific production in the university. Besides several research and teaching laboratories, it has an anatomy amphitheater.

=== Library ===
The library offers its services in two campuses. The Main Library, which is settled in Campus Villa 1, contains most of the collection and resources. The library settled in the “Casona“, in Miraflores District, Lima, has a smaller collection, though, it may request books and other resources to the Main Library by users' demand.

In 2005, the Main Library received the Banco Wiese Sudameris' Library Collection. This collection consists of 13,000 books about economy, finance and humanities. In addition, it contains specialized magazines, multimedia documents, national institutions’ memories and a set of domestic newspapers.

== Academic profile ==
=== Research ===
The Vice-rectory of Research directs research administration.

Recently, the university has undertaken a strategic plan to increase scientific production. The aim is to encourage activities that lead to research projects earn domestic and foreign contests and grants.

Within the strategic plan is the establishment of specialized institutes:

- Cellular and molecular biology
- Chemistry and biochemistry of natural resources
- Microbiology

Annually, the university awards several grants.

Research incentives are mainly for the following areas:

- Veterinary and husbandry
- Agrarian and forest sciences
- Medicine: Clinical trials
- Marine biology
- Environmental engineering and management research

=== Admissions ===
The university has several procedures for admissions. Prospective students must complete secondary education in Perú or an equivalent programme abroad.

==== Ordinary evaluation ====
Ordinary evaluation consists in two tests taken twice a year.

==== University Preparatory Centre ====
Prospective students receive classes of basic courses and are evaluated for several weeks. Those with appropriate qualifications are admitted.

==== Other ====
- Academic preference: Outstanding qualifications during secondary education.
- International Baccalaureate
- Distinguished athlete: Members of a national squad.
- External transfer
- Owner of an academic degree

== Student life ==
=== Cultural Centre ===
Established in 2004, the Cultural Centre is in charge of promotion and management of artistic and cultural activities within the community.

==== International Theatre Festival ====
It has been organized since 2006, becoming an important screen for scenic creation and diffusion.

=== Societies ===
- Medical Students' Scientific Society
- Talides
