= Hypostomus winzi =

Scientific classification
- Kingdom: Animalia
- Phylum: Chordata
- Class: Actinopterygii
- Division: Teleostei
- Order: Siluriformes
- Family: Loricariidae
- Genus: Hypostomus
- Species: H. winzi

Binomial name
- Hypostomus winzi (Fowler, 1945)

Synonyms
- Plecostomus winzi

Species of catfish

Hypostomus winzi is a species of catfish in the family Loricariidae. It is native to South America, where it occurs in the Magdalena River basin. The species reaches 4.2 cm (1.7 inches) SL and is believed to be a facultative air-breather.
