= New Granada sea catfish =

Conservation status
- Endangered (IUCN 2.3)

Scientific classification
- Kingdom: Animalia
- Phylum: Chordata
- Class: Actinopterygii
- Order: Siluriformes
- Family: Ariidae
- Genus: Notarius
- Species: N. bonillai

Binomial name
- Notarius bonillai (Miles, 1945)

Synonyms
- Ariopsis bonillai (Miles, 1945); Arius bonillai (Miles, 1945); Galeichthys bonillai Miles, 1945; Hexanematichthys bonillai (Miles, 1945)

Species of fish

The New Granada sea catfish, or Cazon sea catfish (Notarius bonillai) is a species of catfish in the family Ariidae. It is endemic to the Atrato and Magdalena River basins in Colombia.
