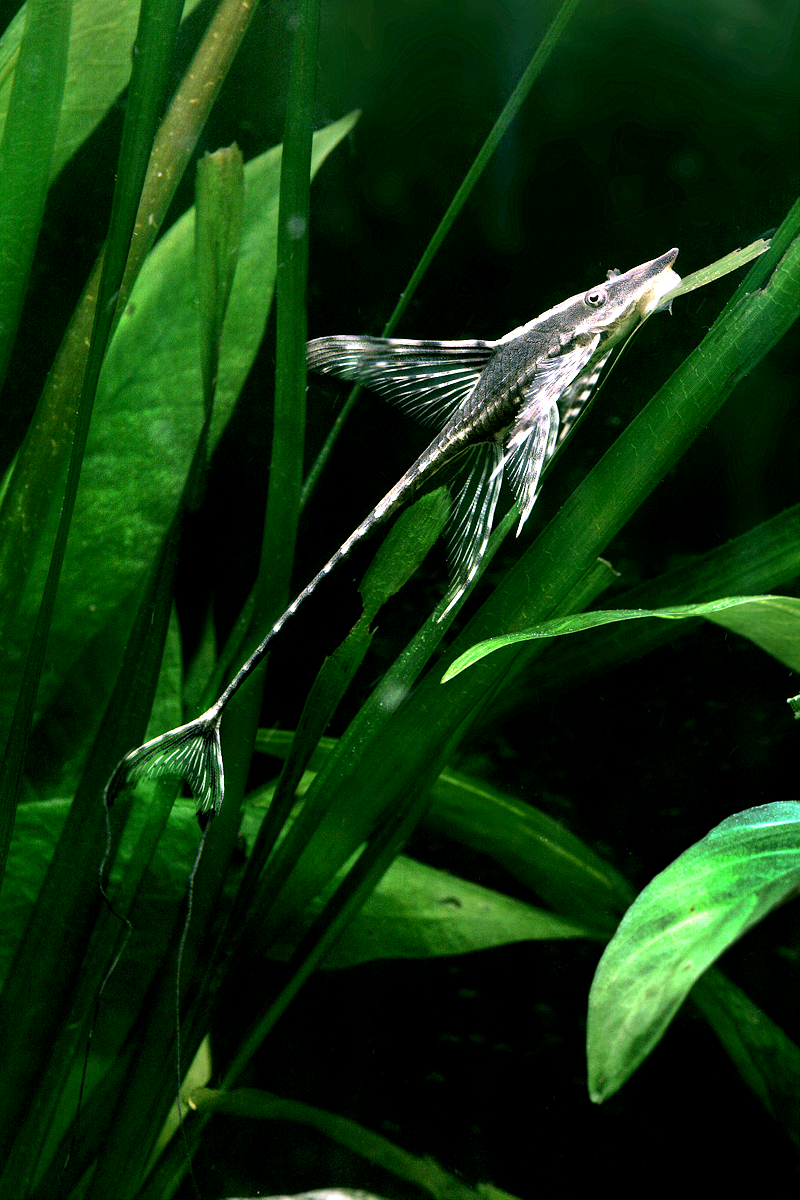

Conservation status
- Data Deficient (IUCN 3.1)

Scientific classification
- Kingdom: Animalia
- Phylum: Chordata
- Class: Actinopterygii
- Order: Siluriformes
- Family: Loricariidae
- Genus: Sturisomatichthys
- Species: S. aureus

Binomial name
- Sturisomatichthys aureus (Steindachner, 1900)

Synonyms
- Loricaria aurea Steindachner, 1900; Sturisoma aureum (Steindachner 1900)

= Sturisomatichthys aureus =

Species of fish

Sturisomatichthys aureus is a species of freshwater ray-finned fish belonging to the family Loricariidae, the suckermouth armored catfishes, and the subfamily Loricariinae, the mailed catfishes. This catfish is endemic to Colombia where it occurs in the Magdalena, San Jorge and Cesar River basins. This species reaches a standard length of 20 cm (7.9 in). This species can be found in the aquarium trade. Its specific name, aureus, refers to its coloration, which can appear golden. The specific name, aureus, is Latin for "gold", an allusion to the golden shimmer over the body of this fish.
