= Baudó River =

River in Colombia

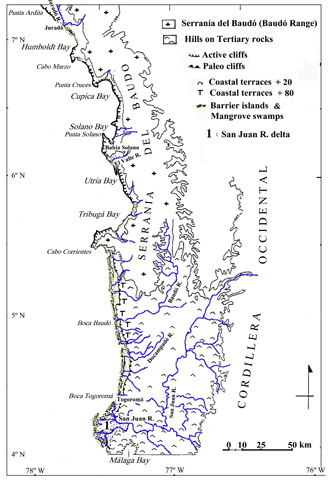
- Baudó Mountain Range in Chocó Department where the Baudó River flows to the Pacific Ocean.

- Location of mouth

Location
- Country: Colombia

Physical characteristics
- Mouth
  - coordinates: 4°58′03″N 77°20′02″W

The Baudó River (Spanish: Río Baudó, Spanish pronunciation: [ˈri.o βawˈðo];) is a river of Colombia. It drains into the Pacific Ocean.

== Fauna ==
=== Fish ===
- Andinoacara biseriatus - A Cichlid.

== See also ==
- List of rivers of Colombia
- Pacific Region, Colombia
