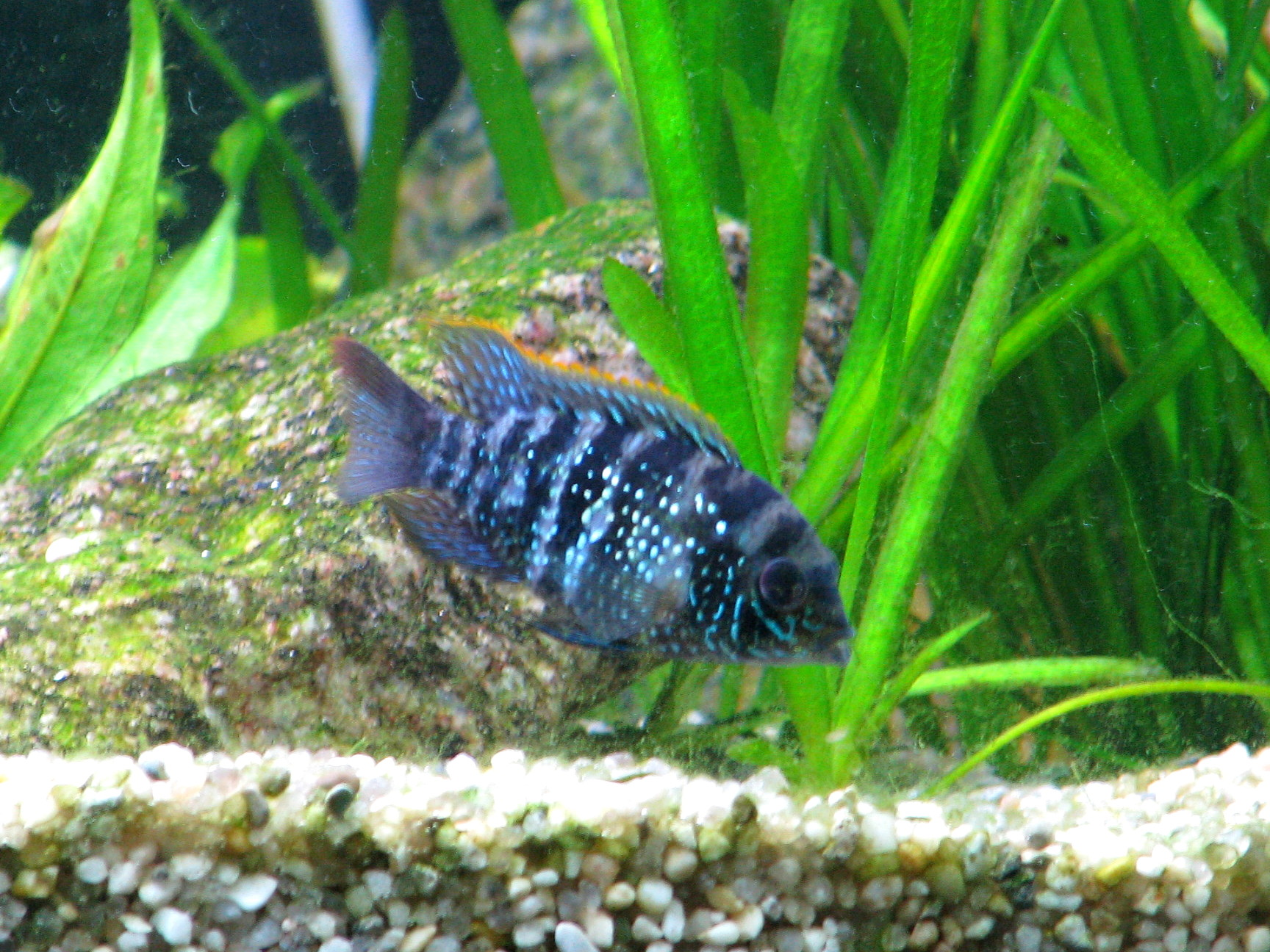

Conservation status
- Least Concern (IUCN 3.1)

Scientific classification
- Kingdom: Animalia
- Phylum: Chordata
- Class: Actinopterygii
- Order: Cichliformes
- Family: Cichlidae
- Genus: Andinoacara
- Species: A. pulcher

Binomial name
- Andinoacara pulcher (T. N. Gill, 1858)

Synonyms
- Cychlasoma pulchrum Gill, 1858; Aequidens pulcher (Gill, 1858)

= Blue acara =

Species of fish

The Blue Acara (Andinoacara pulcher) is a species of cichlid, from the family Cichlidae and order Cichliformes, that has a bright blue-grey coloration throughout the scales across its body. Andinoacaara pulcher is a freshwater species found naturally in Trinidad and Venezuela but is also found and sold for aquariums. Cichlidae is a large family of fish, with many different species housed under it and evidence suggests that there are significant levels of evolution that occurred within the family. Fish within the Cichlidae family can be found in various regions around the world, with diverse features among them.

== Description ==
Andinoacara pulcher express sexual dimporphism, through size and coloration. The males of this species are larger and have a brighter coloration, particularly during the reproductive season compared to the females. They can be differentiated between other geneses that are similar to them such as Geophagu because they have three anal spines, eight distinct bands on body, and they do not have a lobule which is unique to the Geophagu genus that is located on the first branchial arch.

Blue Acara are found in Trinidad and Venezuela, and live in tropical environments. They can reach lengths of around 16 centimeters when fully grown and look relatively similar as juveniles as they do as adults.

== Distribution ==
This species is found in streams and turbid tropical waters in Trinidad and Venezuela. They typically are found in waters with a pH range of 6.5-8.0 and temperatures of 18-23 degrees Celsius.

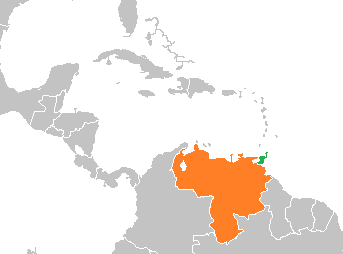
Trinidad and Tobago Venezuela

== Life History ==
When reproducing, the Blue Acara pair will choose a rock to clean and lay eggs on, then the pair will watch over the eggs before the young hatch. After hatching, Blue Acara show parental care for their young shortly after hatching from their eggs and continue these actions for a brief period as the young develop. The male in the pair will protect the young by putting them in its mouth if there are any potential dangers in the area.

Andinoacara pulcher is a predatory species, however, some evidence suggests that they may have an omnivorous diet. Evidence has been found that while a majority of the Blue Acara’s diets consisted of prey species such as insects or other small prey, there was also plant mass within their diet. This trend varied slightly depending on where the population was located, suggesting that prey availability could be a factor in whether this species follows a predatory trend rather than an omnivorous trend. Research suggests that Blue Acara follow a direct hunting strategy in which they pursue their prey directly rather than using methods of intercepting the prey as it flees.

One common order of insects that were found eaten by Blue Acara was Hymenoptera. Hymenoptera consists of a large variety of insects such as ants, wasps, and bees. This species is also known to consume destritus materials, which are waste materials from plants or other animals. These materials, or dead forms of organic matter, are not only used by Blue Acara, but also by many other animals in various ecosystems.

== Conservation Status ==
The Blue Acara is an abundant species. Blue Acara are considered “Least Concern” on the ICUN Red List. There are not fisheries distinctly created with the purpose of breeding Blue Acara, however, they are a common species found as pets and in aquariums. Although there has not been much research on this particular species, their status suggests that they are not declining.

Despite the species being found in abundance, there are growing risks in the environment. Climate change is becoming an increasing threat to many around the world, including aquatic species. One the main effects of climate change in the regions were Blue Acara naturally are found is the altering rainfall trends. These trends, however, affect not only freshwater habitats but also marine and coastal habitats with effects such as sea level rise.

== Taxonomy ==
The Blue Acara is in the genus Andioacara and the family Cichlidae.
