= San Juan River (Colombia) =

Coordinates: 4°02′42″N 77°26′29″W

Río San Juan
- Aerial view of the San Juan River and Chocó natural region of Colombia

- Rivers in Colombia. The mouth of the San Juan is near the center of the country's Pacific coast

Location
- Country: Colombia
- Region: Chocó Department

Physical characteristics
- Source
  - location: Cerro Caramanta, West Andes
- Mouth
  - location: Pacific Ocean near Buenaventura
- Length: 380 km (240 mi)
- Basin size: 16,000 km^{2} (6,200 sq mi)
- Discharge
  - average: 2,055 m^{3}/s (72,600 cu ft/s)

The San Juan River (Spanish: Río San Juan) is a Colombian river that flows into the Pacific Ocean through the Chocó Department. It is approximately 380 kilometres (240 mi) and drains a watershed of 16,000 square kilometres (6,200 sq mi). The river drains into a large delta that covers nearly 300 square kilometres (120 sq mi). The average discharge of the Rio San Juan is 2,054.67 m^{3}/s.

== Geography ==
The river begins on Cerro Caramanta in the West Andes. The delta is due north of Bahía Málaga and Buenaventura.

The mouth of the river has extensive stands of mangroves, part of the Esmeraldas-Pacific Colombia mangroves ecoregion.

== Hydrometry ==
Monthly average flow of San Juan River ( m³/second) measured at Penitas station
Data from 25 years

== Fauna ==
=== Reptiles ===
A species of snake, Dipsas sanctijoannis, is named after the San Juan River of Colombia, and is native to the watershed.

=== Fish ===
- Andinoacara biseriatus - A Cichlid.
- Nematobrycon palmeri - the emperor tetra.

== See also ==
- List of rivers of Colombia
- Pacific Region, Colombia
