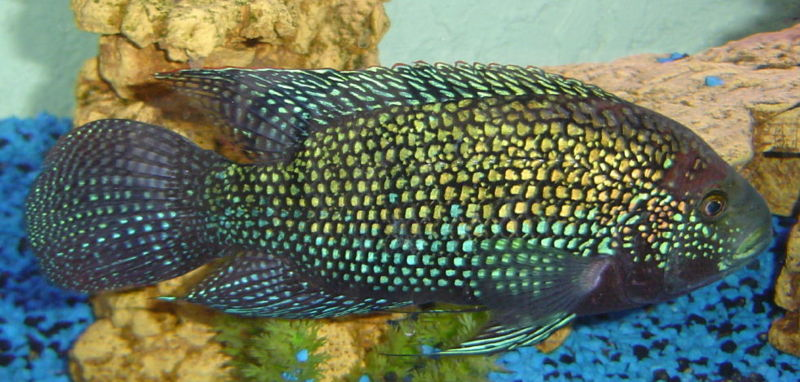
- Rocio octofasciata
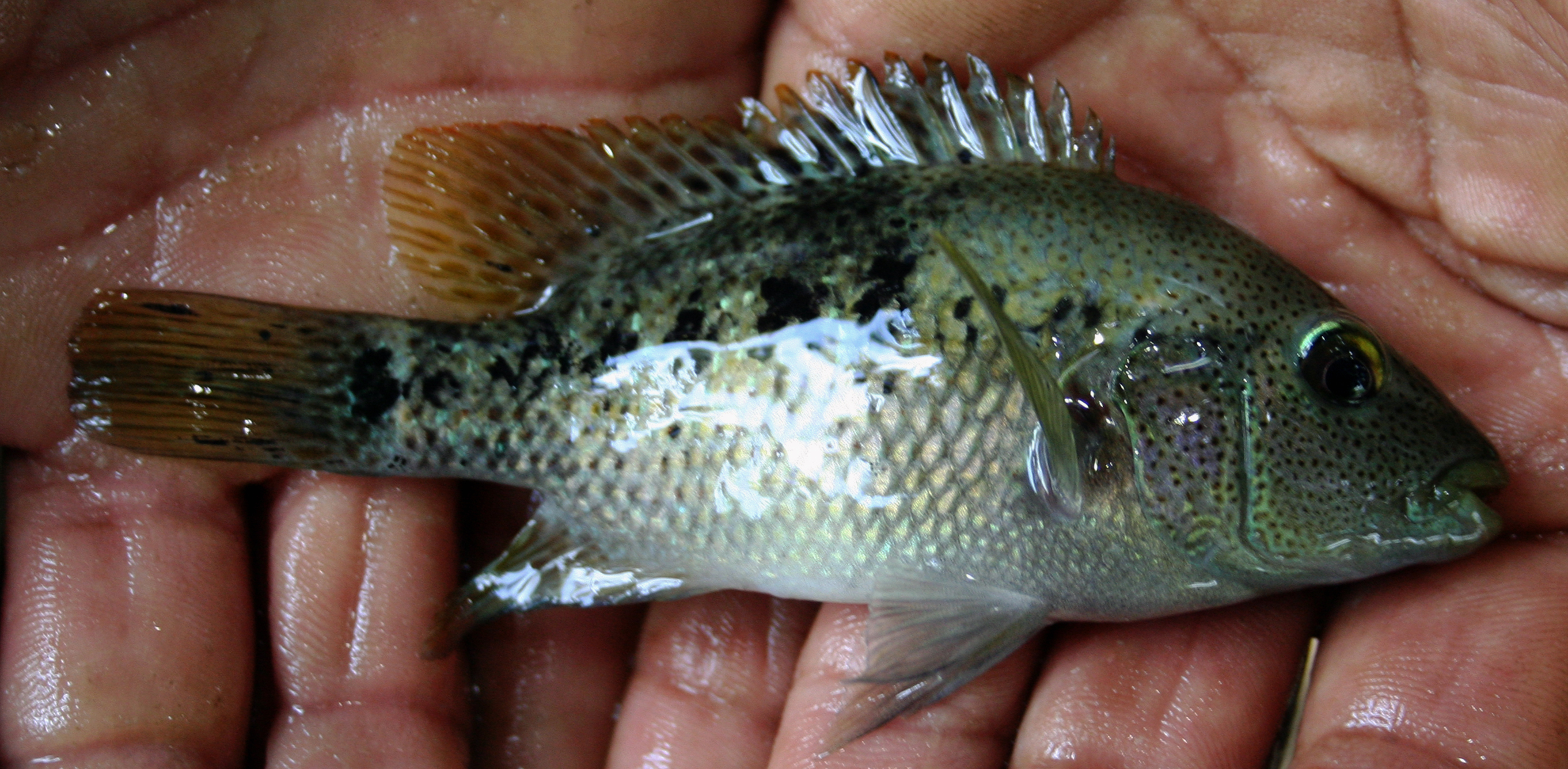
- Nosferatu pame

Scientific classification
- Kingdom: Animalia
- Phylum: Chordata
- Class: Actinopterygii
- Order: Cichliformes
- Family: Cichlidae
- Subfamily: Cichlasomatinae; S. O. Kullander, 1998

Type genus
- Cichlasoma Swainson, 1839

= Cichlasomatinae =

Subfamily of fishes

The Cichlasomatinae are a subfamily of cichlid fishes, including all cichlids native to the Greater Antilles (Cuba and Hispaniola), United States (southern Texas), Mexico and Central America, and many of the cichlids from South America (the other South American subfamilies are Astronotinae, Cichlinae, Geophaginae, and Retroculinae). The subfamily Cichlasomatinae is often divided into two tribes: Cichlasomatini and Heroini, however some authorities classify these two tribes as part of the wider Neotropical and marginally Nearctic subfamily Cichlinae.

== Genera ==
This subfamily contains about 56 genera and 260 species:

- Tribe Cichlasomatini Swainson, 1839
  - Acaronia Myers, 1940
  - Aequidens C. H. Eigenmann & W. L. Bray, 1894
  - Andinoacara Musilová, Říčan & Novák, 2009
  - Bujurquina Kullander, 1986
  - Cichlasoma Swainson, 1839
  - Cleithracara Kullander & Nijssen 1989
  - Ivanacara Römer & Hahn, 2006
  - Krobia S. O. Kullander & Nijssen, 1989
  - Laetacara Kullander, 1986
  - Nannacara Regan, 1905
  - Rondonacara Ottoni & Mattos, 2015
  - Tahuantinsuyoa Kullander, 1986
- Tribe Heroini Kullander, 1998
  - Amatitlania Schmitter-Soto, 2007
  - Amphilophus Agassiz, 1859
  - Archocentrus T.N. Gill, 1877
  - Astatheros Pellegrin, 1904
  - Australoheros Říčan & Kullander, 2006
  - Caquetaia Fowler, 1945
  - Chiapaheros McMahan & Piller, 2015
  - Chocoheros Říčan & Piálek, 2016
  - Chortiheros Říčan & Piálek, 2016
  - Cincelichthys McMahan & Piller, 2015
  - Cryptoheros Allgayer, 2001
  - Darienheros Říčan & Novák 2016
  - Herichthys Baird & Girard, 1854
  - Heroina Kullander, 1996
  - Heros Heckel, 1840
  - Herotilapia Pellegrin, 1904
  - Hoplarchus Kaup, 1860
  - Hypselecara Kullander, 1986
  - Hypsophrys Agassiz, 1859
  - Isthmoheros (Meek & Hildebrand, 1913)
  - Kihnichthys McMahan & Matamoros, 2015
  - Kronoheros Říčan & Piálek, 2016
  - Maskaheros McMahan & Piller, 2015
  - Mayaheros Říčan & Piálek, 2016
  - Mesoheros McMahan & Chakrabarty, 2015
  - Mesonauta Günther, 1867
  - Nandopsis T.N. Gill, 1862
  - Nosferatu De la Maza-Benignos, Ornelas-García, Lozano-Vilano, García-Ramírez & Doadrio, 2015
  - Oscura McMahan & Chakrabarty, 2015
  - Parachromis Agassiz, 1859
  - Paraneetroplus Regan, 1905
  - Petenia Günther, 1862
  - Pterophyllum Heckel, 1840
  - Rheoheros McMahan & Matamoros, 2015
  - Rocio Schmitter-Soto, 2007
  - Symphysodon Heckel, 1840
  - Theraps Günther, 1862
  - Thorichthys Meek, 1904
  - Tomocichla Regan, 1908
  - Trichromis McMahan & Chakrabarty, 2015
  - Uaru Heckel, 1840
  - Vieja Fernández-Yépez, 1969
  - Wajpamheros Říčan & Piálek, 2016
