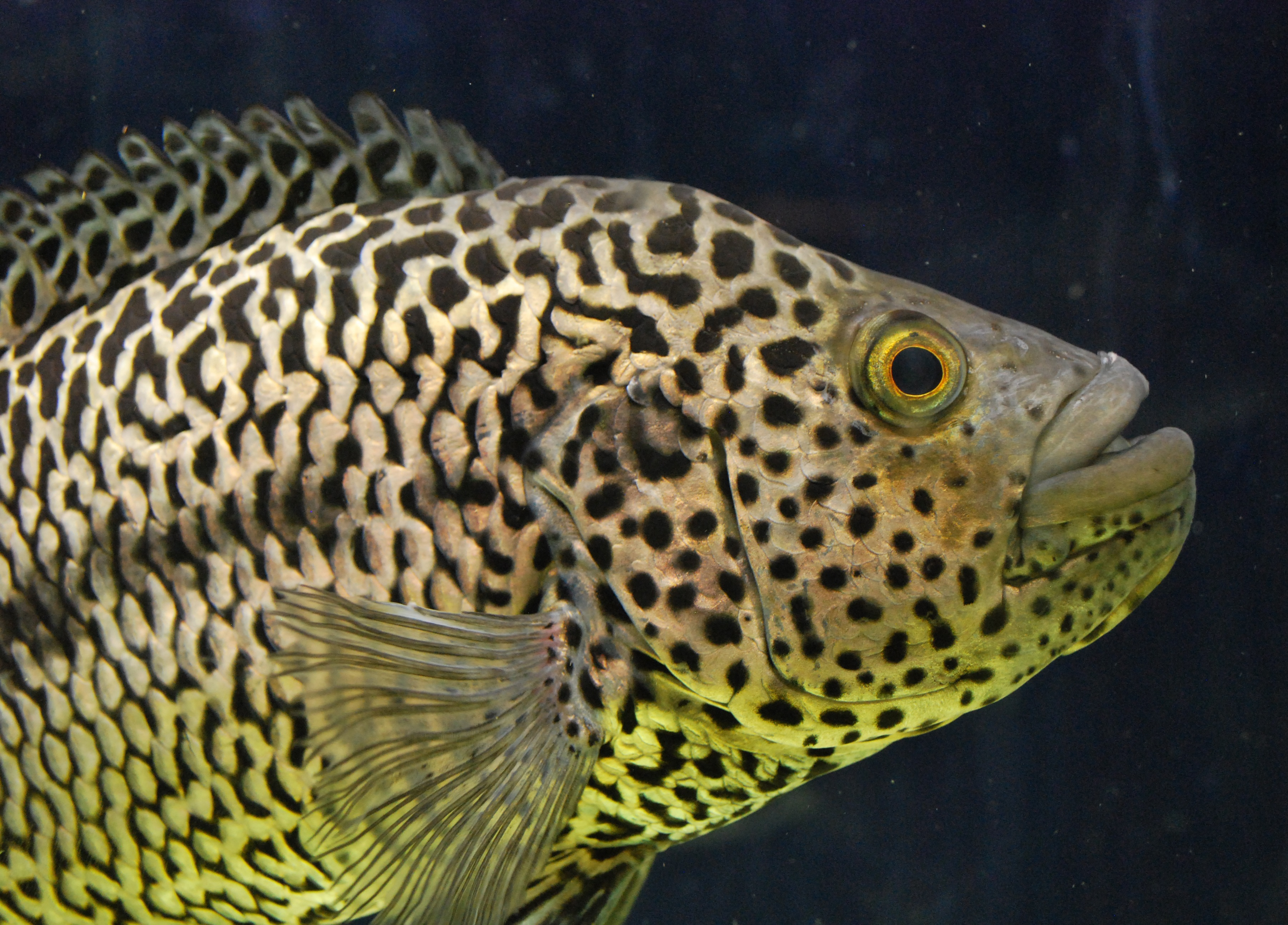
- Parachromis managuensis

Scientific classification
- Kingdom: Animalia
- Phylum: Chordata
- Class: Actinopterygii
- Division: Teleostei
- Order: Cichliformes
- Family: Cichlidae
- Subfamily: Cichlinae
- Tribe: Heroini; S. O. Kullander, 1998

= Heroini =

Heroini Temporal range: 48.6–0 Ma Early Eocene–present

Tribe of cichlid fishes

Heroini is a fish tribe from the Cichlasomatinae subfamily in the family Cichlidae (cichlids). All cichlids native to the Greater Antilles, United States (southern Texas), Mexico and northern Central America are members of this tribe. It also includes most cichlid species in southern Central America (where the only non-Heroini cichlids are Andinoacara and Geophagus) and several species from South America (where several other tribes exist). A large percentage of its species were formerly placed in the genus Cichlasoma (itself now placed in the tribe Cichlasomatini) but have since been moved to other genera.

In other classifications, the tribe Heroini is placed in the subfamily Cichlinae.

== Genera ==
As of 2024, this tribe includes 46 valid genera and approximately 184 species:

- Amatitlania (Schmitter-Soto, 2007)
- Amphilophus (Agassiz, 1859)
- Archocentrus (Gill, 1877)
- Astatheros (Pellegrin, 1904)
- Australoheros (Říčan & Kullander, 2006)
- Caquetaia (Fowler, 1945)
- Chiapaheros (McMahan & Piller, 2015)
- Chocoheros (Říčan & Piálek, 2016)
- Chortiheros (Říčan & Piálek, 2016)
- Chuco (Fernández-Yépez, 1969)
- Cincelichthys (McMahan & Piller, 2015)
- Cribroheros (Říčan & Piálek, 2016)
- Cryptoheros (Allgayer, 2001)
- Darienheros (Říčan & Novák, 2016)
- Herichthys (Baird & Girard, 1854)
- Heroina (Kullander, 1996)
- Heros (Heckel, 1840)
- Herotilapia (Pellegrin, 1904)
- Hoplarchus (Kaup, 1860)
- Hypselecara (Kullander, 1986)
- Hypsophrys (Agassiz, 1859)
- Isthmoheros (Meek & Hildebrand, 1913)
- Kronoheros (Říčan & Piálek, 2016)
- Maskaheros (McMahan & Piller, 2015)
- Mayaheros (Říčan & Piálek, 2016)
- Mesoheros (McMahan & Chakrabarty, 2015)
- Mesonauta (Günther, 1867)
- Nandopsis (Gill, 1862)
- Neetroplus (Günther, 1867)
- Oscura (McMahan & Chakrabarty, 2015)
- Panamius (Schmitter-Soto, 2007)
- Parachromis (Agassiz, 1859)
- Paraneetroplus (Regan, 1905)
- Petenia (Günther, 1862)
- Pterophyllum (Heckel, 1840)
- Rheoheros (McMahan & Matamoros, 2015)
- Rocio (Schmitter-Soto, 2007)
- Symphysodon (Heckel, 1840)
- Talamancaheros (Říčan & Novák, 2016)
- Theraps (Günther, 1862)
- Thorichthys (Meek, 1904)
- Tomocichla (Regan, 1908)
- Trichromis (McMahan & Chakrabarty, 2015)
- Uaru (Heckel, 1840)
- Vieja (Fernández-Yépez, 1969)
- Wajpamheros (Říčan & Piálek, 2016)

=== Genera of disputed validity ===
- Kihnichthys (McMahan & Matamoros, 2015) – Considered by Říčan & Piálek (2016) and Azas (2020) to be a junior synonym of Cincelichthys.
- Nosferatu (De la Maza-Benignos et al., 2015) – Considered by Říčan & Piálek (2016) and FishBase to be an invalid synonym of Herichthys.
