= Theraps =

Conservation status
- Least Concern (IUCN 3.1)

Scientific classification
- Kingdom: Animalia
- Phylum: Chordata
- Class: Actinopterygii
- Division: Teleostei
- Order: Cichliformes
- Family: Cichlidae
- Genus: Theraps; Günther, 1862
- Species: T. irregularis

Binomial name
- Theraps irregularis Günther, 1862

Genus of fish

Theraps is a genus of cichlid fish that includes only a single species, the Arroya cichlid (Theraps irregularis) from fast-flowing rivers and streams in the Usumacinta and Polochic basins of southern Mexico and Guatemala. It is a medium-sized cichlid, up to 19 cm (7.5 in) in standard length.

== Taxonomy ==
Historically, Theraps was included in Cichlasoma. Once recognized as its own genus, it sometimes included a wide range of species now known to belong in other genera, including Cincelichthys, Chortiheros, Chuco, Cryptoheros, Kihnichthys, Oscura, Paraneetroplus, Rheoheros, Talamancaheros, Tomocichla and Wajpamheros. In a major review of 2015, only five species remained in this genus, but in 2016 it was shown that four of these were not close relatives of the Theraps type species, T. irregularis, resulting in them being moved to Chuco and Wajpamheros. As a consequence, Catalog of Fishes now recognizes Theraps as only including the type species, and as of 2023 FishBase agrees.
