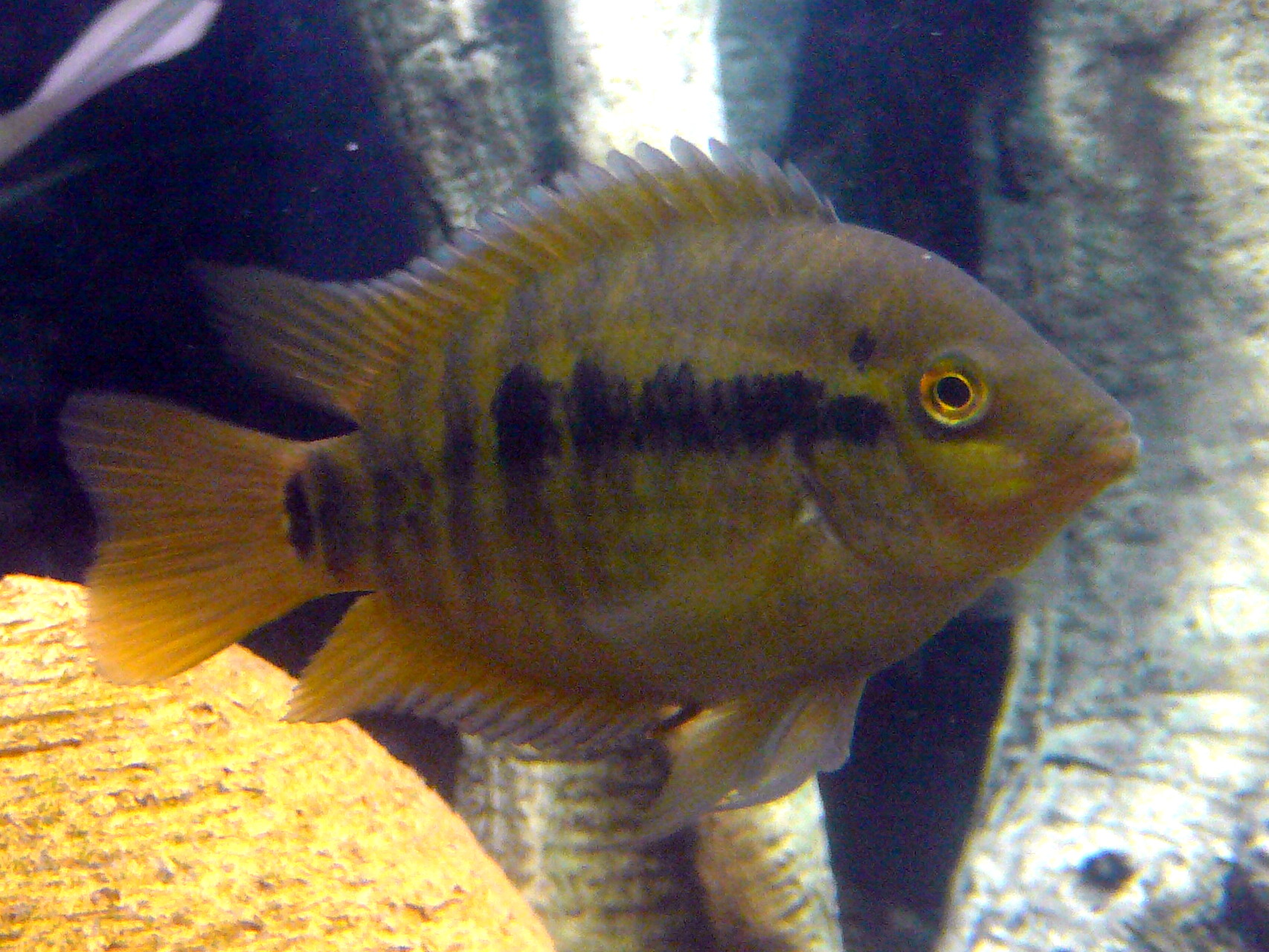

Conservation status
- Least Concern (IUCN 3.1)

Scientific classification
- Domain: Eukaryota
- Kingdom: Animalia
- Phylum: Chordata
- Class: Actinopterygii
- Order: Cichliformes
- Family: Cichlidae
- Subfamily: Cichlinae
- Tribe: Heroini
- Genus: Herotilapia; Pellegrin, 1904
- Species: H. multispinosa

Binomial name
- Herotilapia multispinosa (Günther, 1867)

Synonyms
- Archocentrus multispinosus Günther, 1867

= Rainbow cichlid =

Species of fish

Herotilapia multispinosa (previously: Archocentrus multispinosus) also known as the rainbow cichlid is a Central American freshwater fish of the cichlid family. It is found on the Atlantic slope of Honduras, Nicaragua, and Costa Rica from Patuca River (Honduras) south to Matina River (Costa Rica), and on the Pacific slope of Nicaragua and Costa Rica from Guasaule River south to Tempisque River. Specimens are also reported from the Choluteca River on the Pacific side of Honduras. This species is found in lakes and swamps with muddy bottoms, where it uses its specialized teeth and only 3.5% jaw protrusion to feed mostly on algae. It is commercially important as an aquarium fish. The rainbow cichlid prefers a pH range of 7.0–8.0, water hardness of 9-20 dGH and a temperature range of 21–36 °C.

== Taxonomy ==
The rainbow cichlid was first described in 1867 by Albert Günther and was then placed in the genus Heros, a synonym of Cichlasoma. In 1903, it was removed from the Cichlasoma and placed in its own new genus Herotilapia, solely on the basis of its unique tricuspid teeth, an adaptation to eat filamentous algae. It was then called Herotilapia multispinosa. Herotilapia had been considered to be closely related to, or even synonymous with, the genus Archocentrus but DNA analysis by Oldřich Říčan, et al. demonstrated that the two genera are not very closely related. Rather, the closest relatives to Herotilapia are Tomocichla, Rocio, Astatheros and Cribroheros, of which Rocio (including the Jack Dempsey) has the most similar morphology.

== Description ==
The rainbow cichlid can reach 12–15 cm (4.7" - 6") in length, but most adults are around 7–8 cm. The fish is generally yellow, with hints of reds and browns. A line of black central spots runs from the eye to the base of the tail. As an individual's mood and environment changes, it can change its coloration between dark brown and bright yellow, and can either connect the line of spots into a black horizontal stripe, or extend them into vertical stripes that span across the top and front of the fish. These color changes take place over the course of a few seconds, which is unusual in freshwater fish. There is no evidence that rainbow cichlids exhibit sexual dimorphism.

== Distribution and habitat ==
This cichlid is native to both the Atlantic and Pacific slopes of Central America, ranging from Costa Rica to Honduras and Nicaragua. It is most commonly found in turbid and shallow waters such as the weedy margins of lakes and streams, or small ponds that are periodically flooded by nearby rivers. An introduced population has also established itself in a hot spring at Hévíz, Hungary.

== Diet ==
The rainbow cichlid is an omnivore. In the wild, it mostly eats flocculent detritus, with a preference for filamentous algae, simple algae, and diatoms. It can also prey on smaller fish and insects. In captivity, it readily consumes commercial flakes or pellets.

== Reproduction ==
This cichlid is a pair-bonded substrate brooder, meaning the male and female mate monogamously (at least for the reproductive season) and the eggs are laid on a substrate to which they stick, rather than brooded inside the mouth.

The male and female form a pair after an initial courtship phase, then establish a territory centered on the future laying substrate, such as rocks. Territory defense is mostly by the male, which excludes all other fish, especially other rainbow males. Aggression with other territorial neighbours is intense at first, but soon settles down. A behavior called "pendeling" can then be seen at the boundaries of the territories: the two male territory owners alternate charges and retreats between them, but never go beyond the boundary, as if it were a glass wall. The males can also "parallel-run", swimming parallel to each other along the boundary. Females also engage in territorial defense, but typically less than males.

The preferred egg-laying substrate is a vertical surface, ideally as part of a cave or tunnel. Lines of eggs are deposited in multiple runs. Spawning can take two hours and produce 500-1500 eggs. The eggs are then aggressively defended, most closely by the female while the male patrols the territory borders. The male may be actively excluded from the nest by the female. The eggs are also fanned, i.e. the parent (male or female, but most often the female) swims on the spot, either broadside or facing the egg batch about 2 cm away from it, thus creating a flow of water that brings oxygen to the eggs. Fanning is also performed at night; the parent slowly swims along the egg batch, its body at a 90° angle with the surface, its snout or throat slightly touching the eggs. This peculiar way of fanning the eggs, also seen during the day sometimes, has been called "rocking" or "skim-fanning".

Eggs typically hatch two days after spawning. The young fry, commonly called "wrigglers", are immediately moved by the parents to a pit they have previously dug inside the territory. The parents suck a few wrigglers at a time into their mouths and spit them into the pit. The pit is guarded against other fish. Sometimes, the wrigglers are spit onto a vertical surface rather than a pit. The young adhere to the surface because of adhesive mucus-producing glands on the top of their heads. If they fall off, they are retaken by the parents and spit back into position. This use of vertical surfaces is most commonly seen when oxygen levels are low; the parents then spit the wrigglers onto aquatic plants, near the water surface. Proximity to the surface and to oxygen-producing photosynthesizing plants ensures that the wrigglers get more oxygen.

After a few days, wrigglers become free-swimming fry. They venture away from the pit, but remain together and are still protected by both parents. The parents retrieve them into the pit every evening. Fry care can last four weeks or more, after which the young disperse.

== Vocalizations ==
Rainbows can emit underwater sounds, probably with their swim bladders. Sounds described as "volleys" and "thumps" have been recorded during agonistic interactions. "Growls" before spawning may help synchronize the breeding pair as reported in other Cichlids. A "whoof" sound is produced as an appeasement signal between the breeding pair to minimize aggressive interactions.
