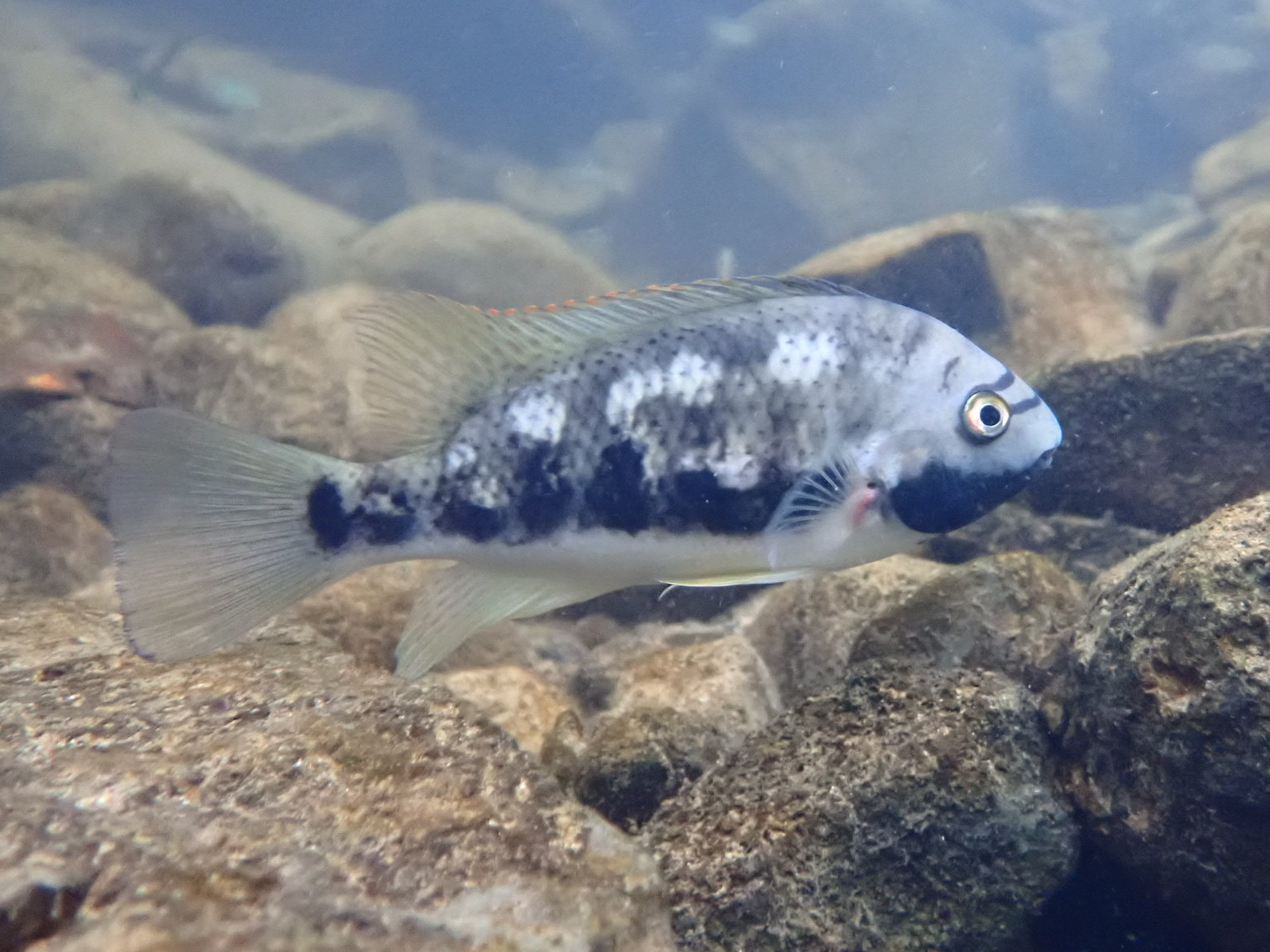
- T. sieboldii in Panama
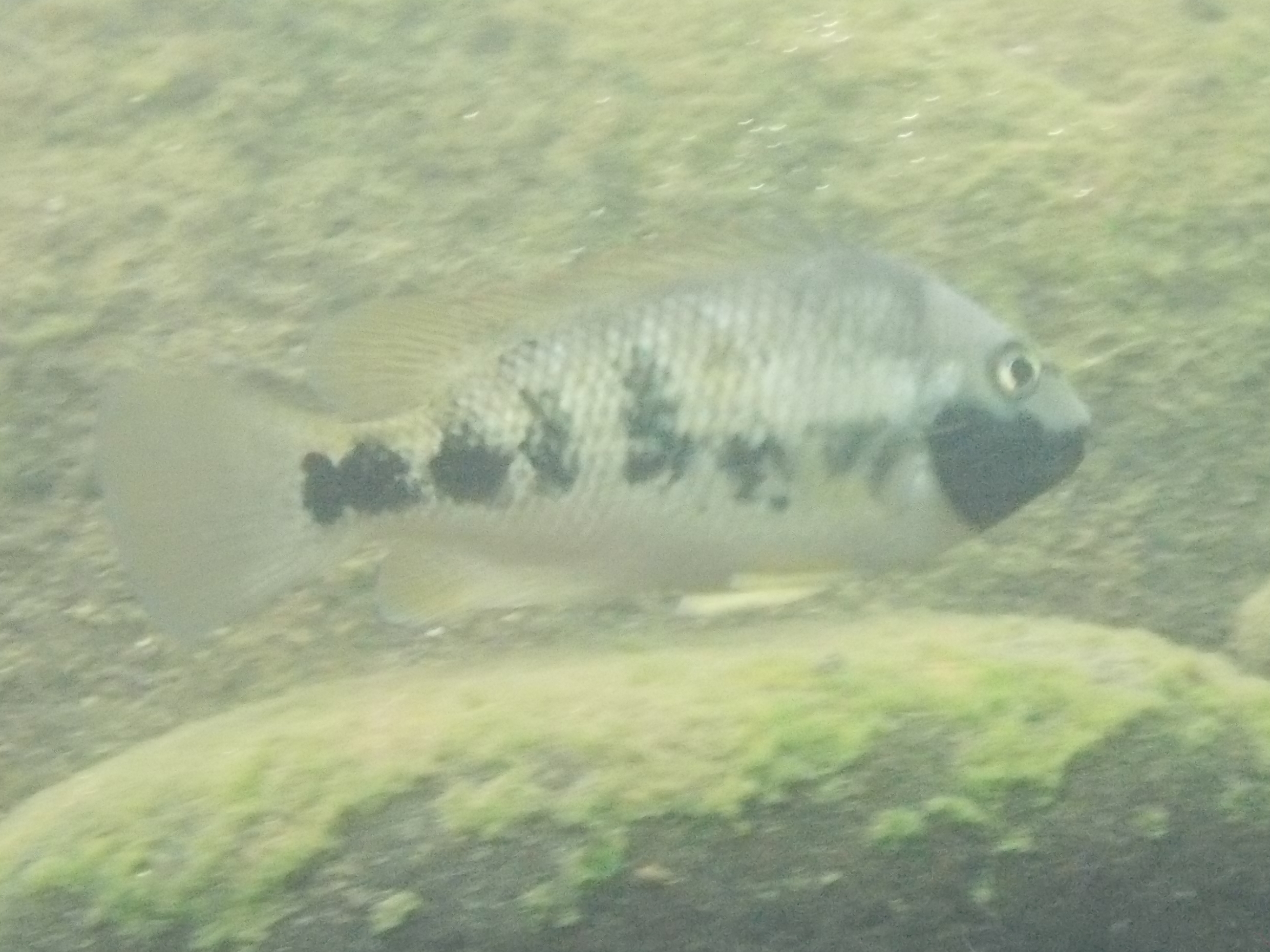
- T. underwoodi in Costa Rica

Scientific classification
- Kingdom: Animalia
- Phylum: Chordata
- Class: Actinopterygii
- Order: Cichliformes
- Family: Cichlidae
- Tribe: Heroini
- Genus: Talamancaheros; Říčan & Novák, 2016

Type species
- Heros sieboldii Kner, 1863

= Talamancaheros =

Genus of fishes

Talamancaheros is a genus of cichlid fish found in fast- and moderately-flowing rivers on the Pacific slope of the Talamanca mountains of Costa Rica and western Panama. Talamancaheros reaches up to 25 cm (10 in) in standard length.

== Species and taxonomy ==
Before the genus Talamancaheros was recognized, these species had been placed in several other genera, including Cichlasoma, Heros, Theraps, Tomocichla and others, but they are not particularly closely related to any of these. The nearest relative of Talamancaheros is Isthmoheros tuyrensis.

There are currently two recognized species in this genus:

- Talamancaheros sieboldii (Kner, 1863) (Siebold's cichlid)
- Talamancaheros underwoodi (Regan, 1906)

Until 2016, T. underwoodi was included as a population of T. sieboldii. T. sieboldii is now restricted to Panama, while T. underwoodi is restricted to Costa Rica.
