= C. pearsei =

C. pearsei may refer to:

- Chaceus pearsei, a crab in the family Pseudothelphusidae
- Cincelichthys pearsei, a fish in the family Cichlidae
- Crocosmia pearsei, a plant in the family Iridaceae
