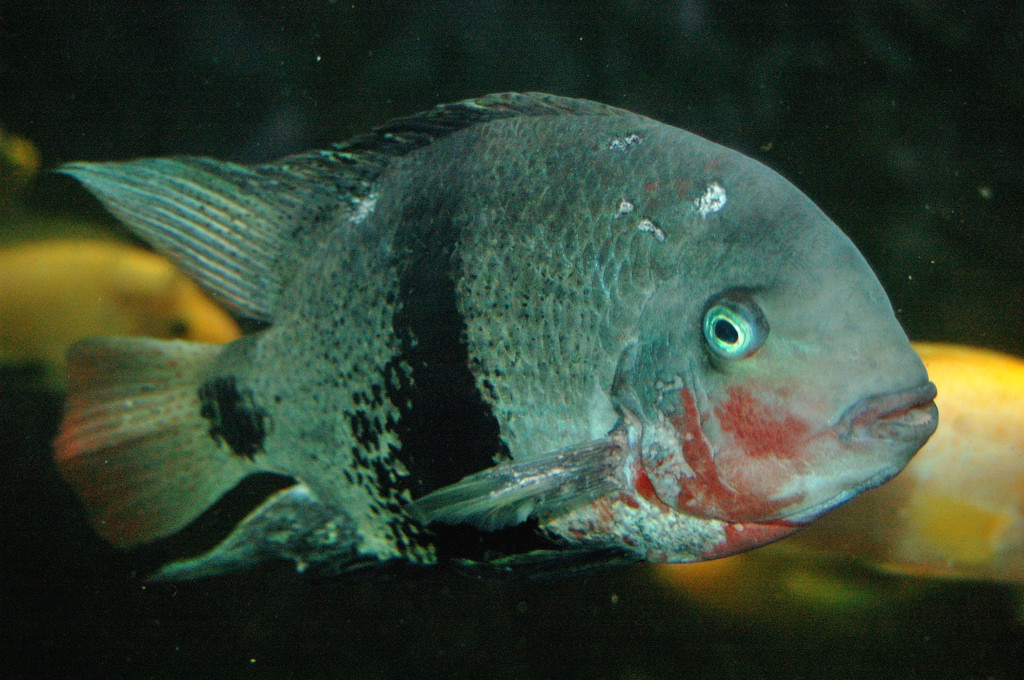
- Vieja maculicauda
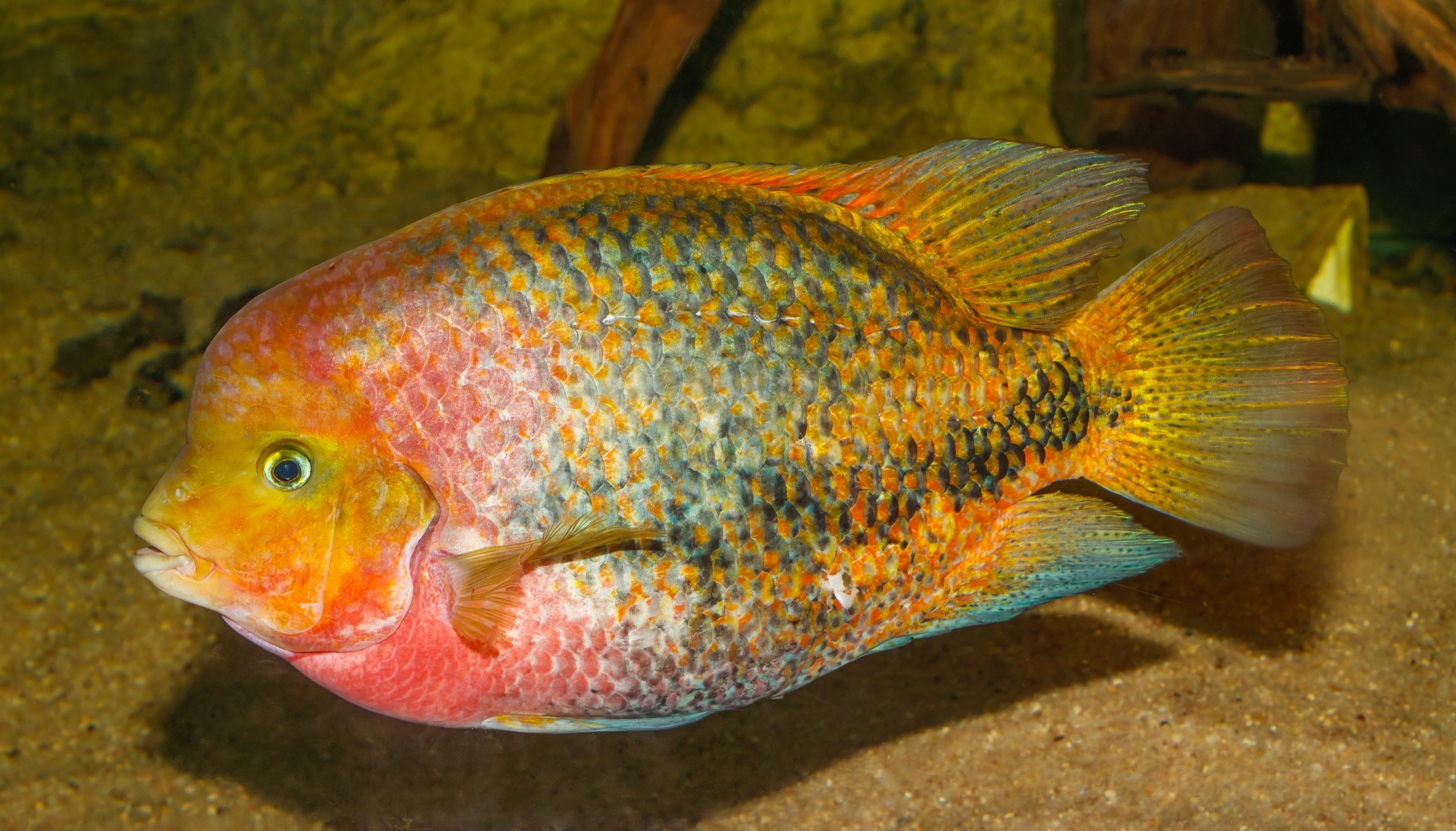
- Vieja melanurus

Scientific classification
- Kingdom: Animalia
- Phylum: Chordata
- Class: Actinopterygii
- Order: Cichliformes
- Family: Cichlidae
- Tribe: Heroini
- Genus: Vieja; Fernández-Yépez, 1969

Synonyms
- Paratheraps Werner & Stawikowski, 1987

= Vieja =

Genus of fishes

Vieja is a genus of cichlid fish from Central America and Mexico. The majority of the species are freshwater fish found in stagnant or slow-moving waters of southern Mexico to El Salvador, but V. maculicauda, which also occurs in brackish waters, ranges south to Panama. They are high-bodied cichlids that reach lengths of up to 17–35 cm (7–14 in) depending on the exact species. Vieja feed mostly on vegetable matter, but may also take small invertebrates.

== Taxonomy and species ==
Historically, Vieja was included in Cichlasoma. Once recognized as its own genus, it sometimes included most of the superficially similar, relatively large and high-bodied cichlids of Central America and southern Mexico, but several of these are now considered to belong to separate genera: Chuco, Cincelichthys, Isthmoheros, Kihnichthys, Maskaheros and Oscura (Oscuro might still be better merged with Vieja, but this remains unconfirmed). Conversely, Vieja has sometimes been included in Paraneetroplus.

There are currently 8 recognized species in the genus Vieja:

- Vieja bifasciata (Steindachner, 1864) (Twoband cichlid)
- Vieja breidohri (U. Werner & Stawikowski, 1987) (Angostura cichlid)
- Vieja fenestrata (Günther, 1860)
- Vieja guttulata (Günther, 1864) (Amatitlan cichlid)
- Vieja hartwegi (J. N. Taylor & R. R. Miller, 1980) (Tailbar cichlid)
- Vieja maculicauda (Regan, 1905) (Blackbelt cichlid)
- Vieja melanurus (Günther, 1862) (Redhead cichlid)
- Vieja zonata (Meek, 1905) (Oaxaca cichlid)

In addition to these, two further species have commonly been recognized: The first is V. coatlicue, but today it is usually considered the Atlantic slope population of V. zonata. The second is V. synspilum, in which case V. melanurus is limited to the Lake Petén system, but a review found that the supposed differences between them are invalid.

Because of individual, regional and age-related variations, definite separation of some species can be difficult. Furthermore, hybrids occur, sometimes even between a Vieja species and a species from another heroine genus. The enigmatic Amphilophus margaritifer, sometimes still recognized as a valid species, is most likely a hybrid involving Thorichthys and Vieja.
