= Rheoheros coeruleus =

Scientific classification
- Kingdom: Animalia
- Phylum: Chordata
- Class: Actinopterygii
- Order: Cichliformes
- Family: Cichlidae
- Genus: Rheoheros
- Species: R. coeruleus

Binomial name
- Rheoheros coeruleus (Stawikowski & U. Werner, 1987)

Synonyms
- Theraps coeruleus Stawikowski & Werner, 1987

Species of fish

Rheoheros coeruleus is a species of cichlid fish endemic to the Atlantic‑slope drainages of Chiapas, Mexico and adjacent Guatemala. It is a rheophilic member of the tribe Heroini and one of two currently recognized species in the genus Rheoheros. The species was originally described as Theraps coeruleus by Ranier Stawikowski and Uwe Werner in 1987, based on material from fast‑flowing tributaries of the Río Grijalva–Usumacinta system.

== Taxonomy ==
Rheoheros coeruleus was first described as Theraps coeruleus in 1987 by Stawikowski and Werner. Subsequent phylogenetic work on Middle American cichlids resulted in the resurrection and rediagnosis of the genus Rheoheros, to which the species was transferred. It is closely related to other rheophilic heroine cichlids of southern Mexico and Guatemala.

== Description ==
Rheoheros coeruleus is a moderately deep‑bodied heroine cichlid distinguished by its bluish body sheen, dark lateral bar patterning, and elongate fins in adults. Males develop more intense coloration and extended dorsal and anal fin rays. Like other rheophilic cichlids, the species shows morphological adaptations to fast‑flowing water, including a streamlined profile and strong fin musculature.

== Distribution and habitat ==
The species is native to the Río Grijalva–Usumacinta basin of Chiapas, Mexico, extending into adjacent Guatemala. It inhabits clear, fast‑moving rivers with rocky substrates, often occurring in riffles and runs. Individuals are typically found in areas with high dissolved oxygen and moderate to strong current.

== Ecology ==
Rheoheros coeruleus is omnivorous, feeding on algae, detritus, small invertebrates, and organic material scraped from submerged surfaces. Like many Middle American cichlids, it is a substrate‑spawning species that forms monogamous breeding pairs and provides biparental care to eggs and fry.

== Conservation status ==
The species has a restricted geographic range but remains locally common in suitable habitat. No major widespread threats have been identified, although localized impacts such as sedimentation, pollution, and hydrological modification may affect some populations.

== In the aquarium ==
Rheoheros coeruleus occasionally appears in the aquarium trade, where it is valued for its coloration and riverine behavior. It requires strong water movement, high oxygenation, and ample space. Captive pairs exhibit typical heroine cichlid breeding behavior.
