= Isthmoheros tuyrensis =

Scientific classification
- Kingdom: Animalia
- Phylum: Chordata
- Class: Actinopterygii
- Order: Cichliformes
- Family: Cichlidae
- Subfamily: Cichlinae
- Tribe: Heroini
- Genus: Isthmoheros; Říčan and Novák, 2016
- Species: I. tuyrensis

Binomial name
- Isthmoheros tuyrensis (Meek & Hildebrand, 1913)

Synonyms
- Cichlasoma tuyrense Meek & Hildebrand, 1913; Amphilophus tuyrensis (Meek & Hildebrand, 1913); Vieja tuyrensis (Meek & Hildebrand, 1913)

Species of fish

Isthmoheros tuyrensis, is a species of cichlid fish found in slow-moving freshwater habitats on the Pacific slope of eastern Panama. Before it was recognized as the only member of the genus Isthmoheros, it was placed in several other genera, including Cichlasoma, Vieja and others, but it is not particularly closely related to any of these. The nearest relative of I. tuyrensis is Talamancaheros. I. tuyrensis reaches up to 23.5 cm (9.3 in) in standard length and eats vegetable matter and detritus.
