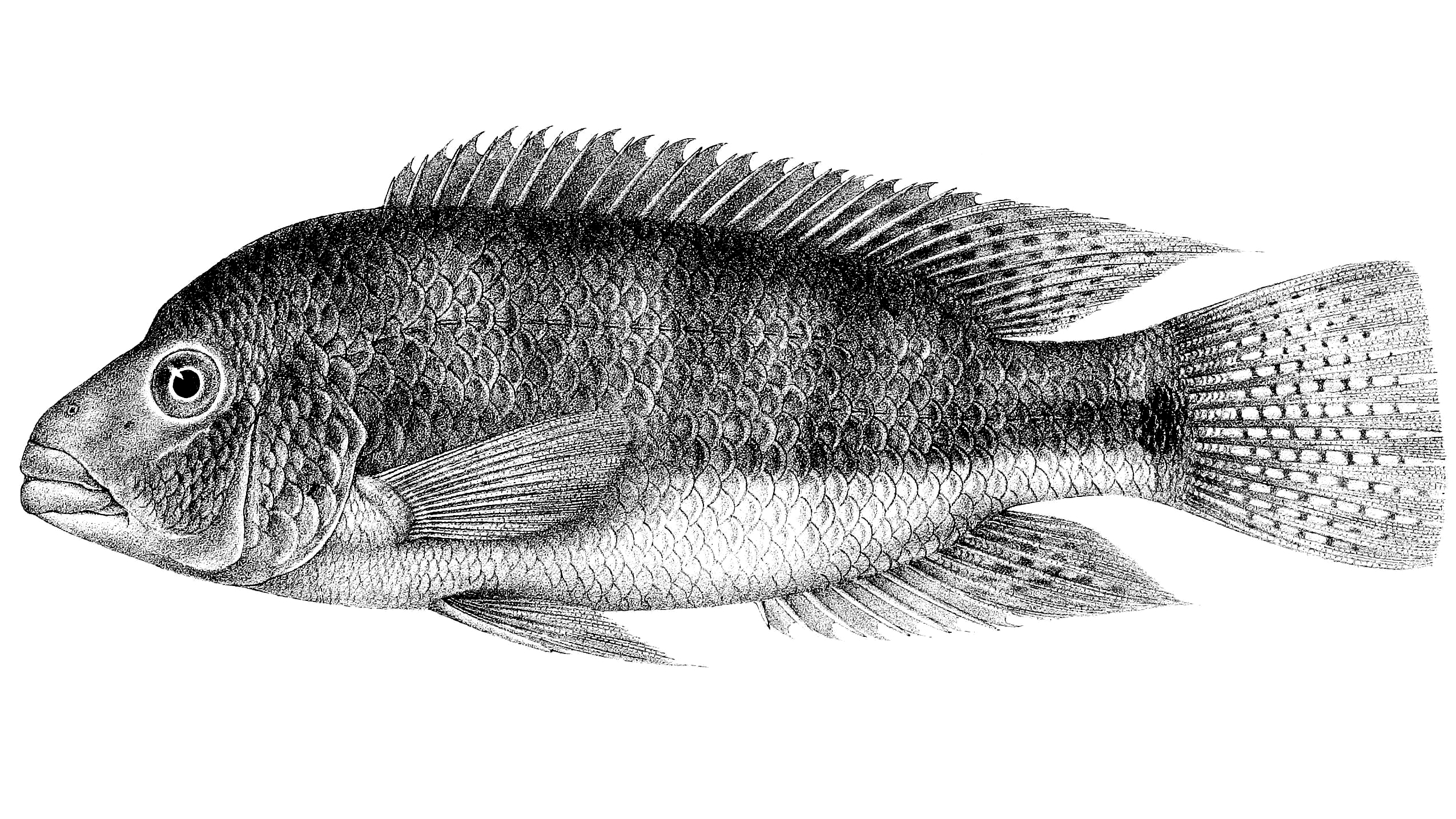
- Chuco microphthalmus

Scientific classification
- Kingdom: Animalia
- Phylum: Chordata
- Class: Actinopterygii
- Order: Cichliformes
- Family: Cichlidae
- Subfamily: Cichlinae
- Genus: Chuco; Fernández-Yépez, 1969

Type species
- Chuco microphthalmus (Günther, 1862)

= Chuco (fish) =

Genus of fishes

Chuco is a genus of medium-sized cichlid fishes from moderately to fast-flowing rivers and streams on the Atlantic slope of southern Mexico and northern Central America.

== Taxonomy and species ==
Historically, Chuco was included in Cichlasoma. Subsequently, the species were moved to Theraps, but in 2016 it was shown that they are not close relatives of the Theraps type species, T. irregularis, resulting in them being moved to Chuco (another species was moved to Wajpamheros).

There are currently three recognized species in the genus Chuco:

- Chuco godmanni (Günther, 1862) – southern checkmark cichlid
- Chuco intermedium (Günther, 1862) – northern checkmark cichlid
- Chuco microphthalmus (Günther, 1862)
