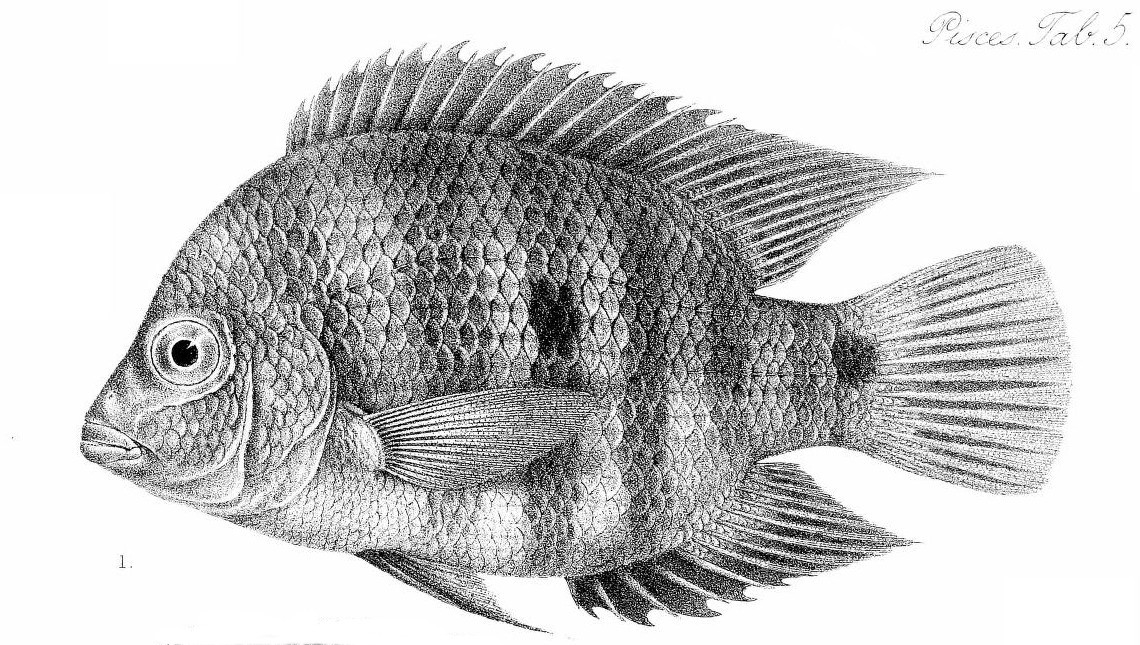
- Astatheros macracanthus

Scientific classification
- Kingdom: Animalia
- Phylum: Chordata
- Class: Actinopterygii
- Order: Cichliformes
- Family: Cichlidae
- Subfamily: Cichlinae
- Tribe: Heroini
- Genus: Astatheros; Pellegrin, 1904
- Species: A. macracanthus

Binomial name
- Astatheros macracanthus (Günther, 1864)

Synonyms
- Amphilophus macracanthus; Cichlasoma macracanthum; Heros macracanthus

= Astatheros =

Genus of fishes

Astatheros macracanthus, the blackthroat cichlid, is a species of cichlid freshwater fish from southern Mexico and northern Central America. It is the only recognized species in the genus Astatheros, but it was originally described in Heros, then for a long period included in Cichlasoma and until 2008 it was typically included in Amphilophus. Several other species have also been placed in Astatheros in the past, but they are now generally placed in Cribroheros. This blackthroat cichlid is omnivorous and reaches up to 25 cm (10 in) in standard length.
