= Darienheros =

Conservation status
- Vulnerable (IUCN 3.1)

Scientific classification
- Kingdom: Animalia
- Phylum: Chordata
- Class: Actinopterygii
- Order: Cichliformes
- Family: Cichlidae
- Subfamily: Cichlinae
- Tribe: Heroini
- Genus: Darienheros; Říčan & Novák, 2016
- Species: D. calobrensis

Binomial name
- Darienheros calobrensis (Meek & Hildebrand, 1913)

Synonyms
- Amphilophus calobrensis Meek & Hildebrand, 1913; Cichlasoma calobrense Meek & Hildebrand, 1913

Species of fish

Darienheros calobrensis, is a species of cichlid found in Middle America. It is distributed in the Darién area of eastern Panama on the Pacific slope in the Tuíra, Chucunaque and Bayano River basins. This species is the only known member of its genus. The specific name alludes to the Rio Calobre, the type locality.
