= Tomocichla tuba =

Scientific classification
- Kingdom: Animalia
- Phylum: Chordata
- Class: Actinopterygii
- Order: Cichliformes
- Family: Cichlidae
- Genus: Tomocichla
- Species: T. tuba

Binomial name
- Tomocichla tuba (Meek, 1912)

Synonyms
- Cichlasoma tuba Meek, 1912; Tomocichla underwoodi Regan, 1908; Theraps underwoodi (Regan, 1908)

Species of fish

Tomocichla tuba is a species of cichlid found in fast-moving waters on the Atlantic slope of Central America in Nicaragua, Costa Rica and Panama. This species can reach a total length of 30 cm (12 in).
