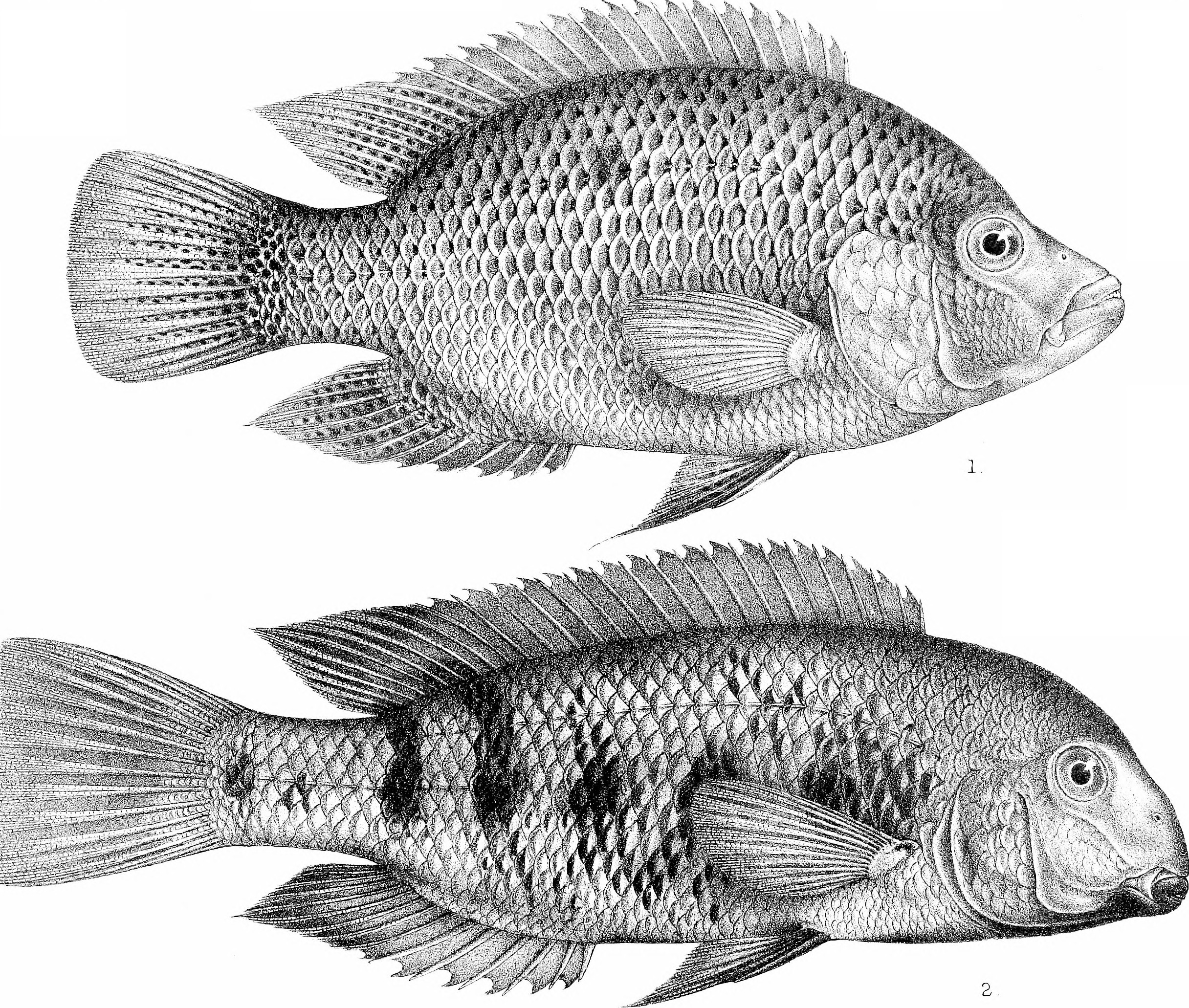
- 2. Paraneetroplus bulleri (lower image)

Scientific classification
- Kingdom: Animalia
- Phylum: Chordata
- Class: Actinopterygii
- Order: Cichliformes
- Family: Cichlidae
- Tribe: Heroini
- Genus: Paraneetroplus; Regan, 1905

Type species
- Paraneetroplus bulleri Regan, 1905

= Paraneetroplus =

Genus of fishes

Paraneetroplus is a genus of cichlid fish native to moderately to fast-flowing waters in the Coatzacoalcos, Grijalva and Papaloapan river basins in southern Mexico. They reach up to 20–25.5 cm (8–10 in) in length.

== Taxonomy and species ==
Historically, Paraneetroplus was included in the genus Cichlasoma (which is distantly related) and then in Theraps (which is relatively closely related). Once Paraneetroplus was recognized as its own genus, the members of Maskaheros and Vieja often were included within it. Today these are generally recognized as three separate but very closely related genera.

There are three or four currently recognized species in the genus Paraneetroplus:

- Paraneetroplus bulleri Regan, 1905 (Sarabia cichlid)
- Paraneetroplus gibbiceps (Steindachner, 1864) (Teapa cichlid)
- Paraneetroplus nebuliferus (Günther, 1860) (Papaloapan cichlid)
- Paraneetroplus omonti Allgayer, 1988 – recognized by Catalog of Fishes, but not by FishBase where considered a synonym of P. gibbiceps
