= Parrot cichlid =

Parrot cichlid may refer to:

- Hoplarchus psittacus, a South American cichlid
- Hypsophrys nicaraguensis, a Central American cichlid
- Blood parrot cichlid, a hybrid cichlid created in Asia

== See also ==
- Parrotfish, a group of marine species
