= Chocoheros =

Conservation status
- Near Threatened (IUCN 3.1)

Scientific classification
- Kingdom: Animalia
- Phylum: Chordata
- Class: Actinopterygii
- Order: Cichliformes
- Family: Cichlidae
- Subfamily: Cichlinae
- Tribe: Heroini
- Genus: Chocoheros; Říčan & Piálek, 2016
- Species: C. microlepis

Binomial name
- Chocoheros microlepis (Dahl, 1960)

Synonyms
- Cichlasoma microlepis Dahl, 1960

Genus of fishes

Chocoheros is a monotypic genus of cichlid. Its only known species is Chocoheros microlepis, found in South America. It is endemic to the single river basin of Rio Baudó on the Pacific side of Colombia.
