= Chiapaheros =

Conservation status
- Vulnerable (IUCN 3.1)

Scientific classification
- Kingdom: Animalia
- Phylum: Chordata
- Class: Actinopterygii
- Order: Cichliformes
- Family: Cichlidae
- Tribe: Heroini
- Genus: Chiapaheros; McMahan & K. R. Piller, 2015
- Species: C. grammodes

Binomial name
- Chiapaheros grammodes (J. N. Taylor & R. R. Miller, 1980)

Synonyms
- Cichlasoma grammodes Taylor & Miller, 1980

Genus of fishes

Chiapaheros grammodes is a species of cichlid fish found in the upper part of the Grijalva River basin in southern Mexico and far western Guatemala. Adults generally inhabit areas with moderate to strong current, but they can also be found in backwaters and juveniles generally occur in calm waters. This species is the only known member of its genus, but historically it has been placed in several other genera. It reaches up to about 20 cm (8 in) in standard length. C. grammodes is relatively aggressive and quite predatory, tending towards piscivory. Both natural and aquarium hybrids have occurred between this species and Vieja hartwegi.
