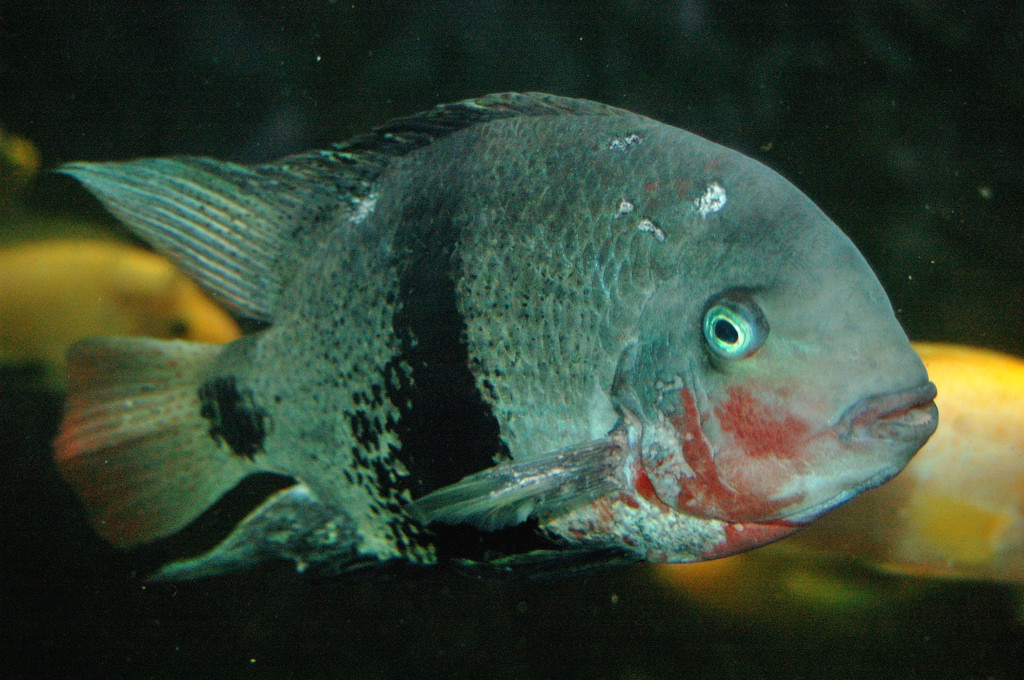

Conservation status
- Least Concern (IUCN 3.1)

Scientific classification
- Domain: Eukaryota
- Kingdom: Animalia
- Phylum: Chordata
- Class: Actinopterygii
- Order: Cichliformes
- Family: Cichlidae
- Genus: Vieja
- Species: V. maculicauda

Binomial name
- Vieja maculicauda (Regan, 1905)

Synonyms
- Paraneetroplus maculicauda Regan, 1905

= Vieja maculicauda =

Species of fish

Vieja maculicauda also known as the blackbelt cichlid, is a cichlid fish species native to Central America from Southern Mexico to Panama.
