= Vieja bifasciata =

Scientific classification
- Kingdom: Animalia
- Phylum: Chordata
- Class: Actinopterygii
- Order: Cichliformes
- Family: Cichlidae
- Genus: Vieja
- Species: V. bifasciata

Binomial name
- Vieja bifasciata (Steindachner, 1864)

Synonyms
- Heros bifasciatus Steindachner, 1864; Cichlasoma bifasciatum (Steindachner, 1864); Paraneetroplus bifasciatus (Steindachner, 1864); Theraps bifasciatum (Steindachner, 1864); Paraneetroplus bifasciata (Steindachner, 1864)

Species of fish

Vieja bifasciata, also known as the twoband cichlid or red-spotted cichlid, is a large and colorful freshwater fish native to Mexico and Guatemala. It is found from the River Grijalva and Usumacinta basins in western parts of Mexico and Guatemala. It belongs to the family Cichlidae, which includes many popular aquarium fish. Vieja bifasciata can grow up to 12 inches (30 cm) in length and has a deep-bodied shape. It has a reddish-brown base color with two black bands running along the body, and a red or yellow patch on the forehead. The fins are also edged with different colors, and the tail fin is slightly forked.

== Habitat ==
It prefers slow-moving or still waters with plenty of vegetation and algae, such as lakes, coastal lagoons, and rivers.

== Reproduction ==
Vieja bifasciata is a sexually dimorphic fish, meaning that the males and the females have different physical characteristics. Males have a prominent nuchal hump on their forehead and are larger, brighter colored. Females are smaller, duller, and have a rounded genital papilla. Vieja bifasciata is an egg-layer that forms monogamous pairs and spawns on flat rocks or in pits dug in the substrate. Both parents guard and care for the eggs and fry until they are independent.
