= Chortiheros =

Conservation status
- Vulnerable (IUCN 3.1)

Scientific classification
- Kingdom: Animalia
- Phylum: Chordata
- Class: Actinopterygii
- Division: Teleostei
- Order: Cichliformes
- Family: Cichlidae
- Subfamily: Cichlinae
- Tribe: Heroini
- Genus: Chortiheros; Říčan & Dragová, 2016
- Species: C. wesseli

Binomial name
- Chortiheros wesseli (R. R. Miller, 1996)

Synonyms
- Theraps wesseli Miller, 1996

Species of fish

Chortiheros wesseli, commonly known as the Honduran mojarra, is a species of cichlid found in Middle America. It is endemic to fast-flowing waters of the Río Papaloteca, Río Cangrejal and Río Danto in the northern Caribbean coast of Honduras. This species is the only known member of its genus.
