= Heroina isonycterina =

Conservation status
- Least Concern (IUCN 3.1)

Scientific classification
- Domain: Eukaryota
- Kingdom: Animalia
- Phylum: Chordata
- Class: Actinopterygii
- Order: Cichliformes
- Family: Cichlidae
- Tribe: Heroini
- Genus: Heroina
- Species: H. isonycterina

Binomial name
- Heroina isonycterina S. O. Kullander, 1996

Species of fish

Heroina isonycterina, also known as the bujurqui, is a species of cichlid native to tropical Amazonian rivers of Colombia, Ecuador and Peru.

This species grows to a length of 10.2 centimetres (4.0 in) SL. This species is the only known member of its genus.
