= Montecristo cichlid =

Conservation status
- Data Deficient (IUCN 3.1)

Scientific classification
- Kingdom: Animalia
- Phylum: Chordata
- Class: Actinopterygii
- Order: Cichliformes
- Family: Cichlidae
- Subfamily: Cichlinae
- Tribe: Heroini
- Genus: Oscura; McMahan & Chakrabarty, 2015
- Species: O. heterospila

Binomial name
- Oscura heterospila (C. L. Hubbs, 1936)

Synonyms
- Cichlasoma heterospilum; Cichlasoma heterospilus; Herichthys heterospilus; Theraps heterospila; Theraps heterospilum; Theraps heterospilus; Vieja heterospila; Vieja heterospilus

Species of fish

The Montecristo cichlid (Oscura heterospila) is a species of freshwater fish from the Atlantic slope of southern Mexico and Guatemala. This cichlid occurs in lagoons, creeks and rivers with slight to moderate current in the Grijalva–Usumacinta, Candelaria, Champotón and Coatzacoalcos river drainages. It is currently recognized as the only species in its genus, but it is closely related to –and possibly should be merged into– Vieja (a genus where it also has been placed in the past). The Montecristo cichlid reaches up to 24 cm (9.4 in) in standard length.
