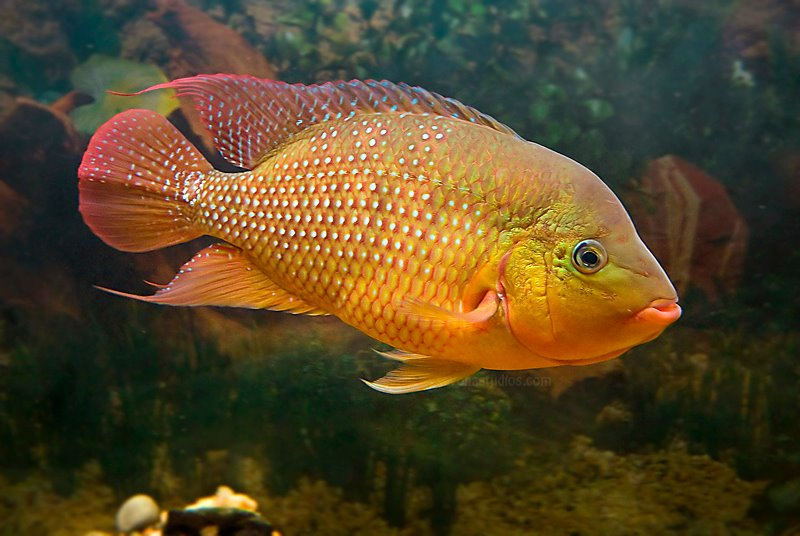
- Mesoheros festae

Scientific classification
- Kingdom: Animalia
- Phylum: Chordata
- Class: Actinopterygii
- Order: Cichliformes
- Family: Cichlidae
- Tribe: Heroini
- Genus: Mesoheros; McMahan & Chakrabarty, 2015

Type species
- Heros festae Boulenger 1899

= Mesoheros =

Genus of fishes

Mesoheros is a genus of cichlids. Species of the genus are found in Colombia, Ecuador, and Peru; Atrato River flowing into the Atlantic, San Juan, Baudó and Patia Rivers to Esmeraldas and Tumbes Rivers flowing into the Pacific.

== Species ==
There are currently 4 recognized species in this genus:

- Mesoheros atromaculatus (Regan, 1905)
- Mesoheros festae (Boulenger, 1899) (Red Terror)
- Mesoheros gephyrum
- Mesoheros ornatus (Regan, 1905)
