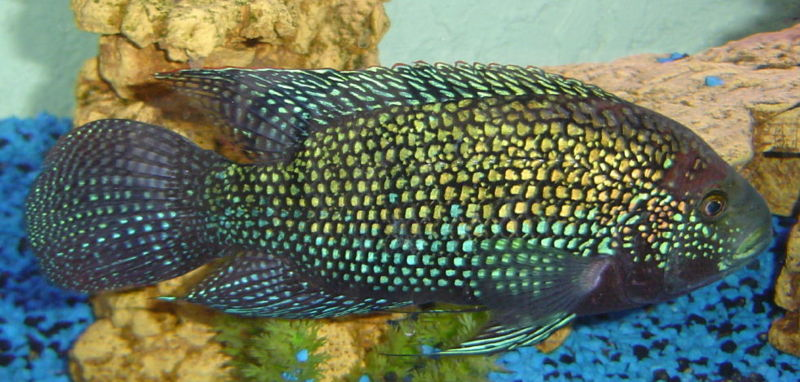
- Jack Dempsey (R. octofasciata)

Scientific classification
- Kingdom: Animalia
- Phylum: Chordata
- Class: Actinopterygii
- Order: Cichliformes
- Family: Cichlidae
- Tribe: Heroini
- Genus: Rocio; Schmitter-Soto, 2007

Type species
- Heros octofasciatus Regan, 1903

= Rocio =

Genus of cichlid fishes

Rocio is a small genus of cichlid freshwater fishes from southern Mexico and northern Central America.

== Species ==
There are currently four recognized species in this genus:

- Rocio gemmata Contreras-Balderas & Schmitter-Soto, 2007 – from the Yucatan Peninsula, Mexico
- Rocio ocotal Schmitter-Soto, 2007 – from Lake Ocotal, Mexico
- Rocio octofasciata (Regan, 1903) (Jack Dempsey) – from Honduras to southern Mexico
- Rocio spinosissima (Vaillant & Pellegrin, 1902) – Lake Izabal basin, Guatemala

These have historically been placed in the genera Cichlasoma or Heros, but they are quite distinct. R. gemmata and R. ocotal were typically regarded as populations of the closely related R. octofasciata until 2007; a review in 2018 recommended that R. gemmata should be considered a synonym of R. octofasciata, whereas a review in 2021 argued that they should be recognized as separate.

== Etymology ==
The genus name is derived from name of J. J. Schmitter-Soto's wife. Meaning dew of the morning in Spanish, this ties in with the colorful spotting that is found in members of this genus.
