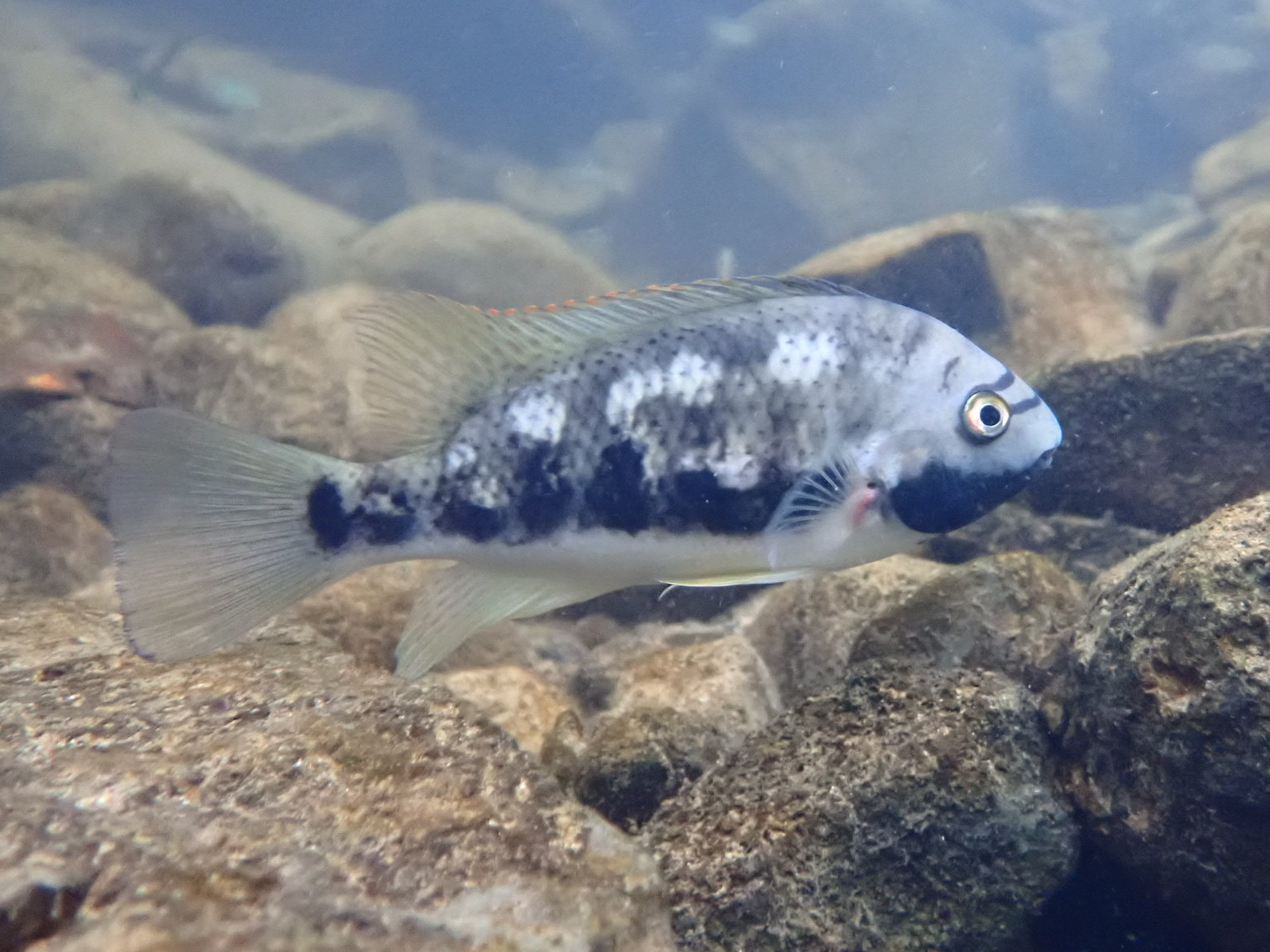
- In Panama

Scientific classification
- Kingdom: Animalia
- Phylum: Chordata
- Class: Actinopterygii
- Order: Cichliformes
- Family: Cichlidae
- Genus: Talamancaheros
- Species: T. sieboldii

Binomial name
- Talamancaheros sieboldii (Kner, 1863)

Synonyms
- Heros sieboldii Kner, 1863; Cichlasoma sieboldii Kner, 1863; Tomocichla sieboldii Kner, 1863

= Talamancaheros sieboldii =

Species of fish

Talamancaheros sieboldii, the Siebold's cichlid, is a species of cichlid fish found in fast- and moderately-flowing rivers on the Pacific slope of western Panama. The population in Costa Rica, which formerly was included in this species, is now recognized as T. underwoodi. T. sieboldii reaches up to 25 cm (10 in) in standard length and eats vegetable matter and detritus.
