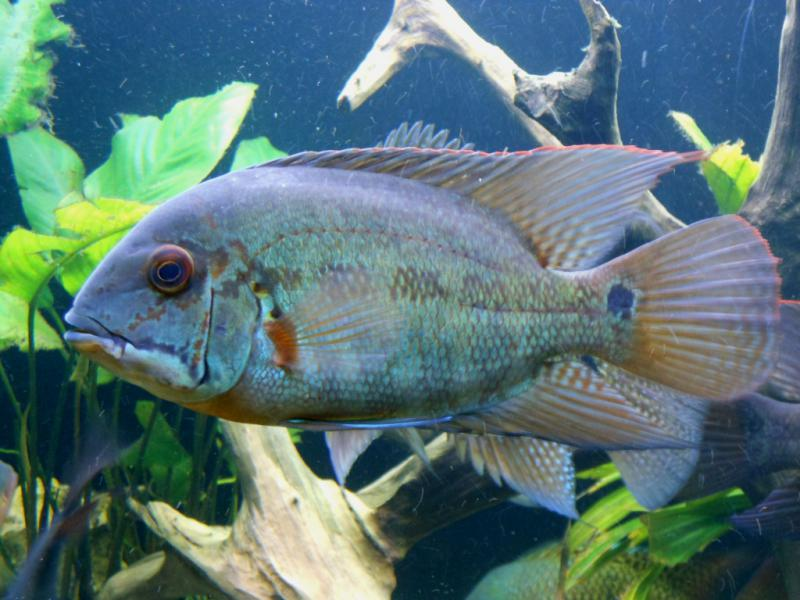

Scientific classification
- Kingdom: Animalia
- Phylum: Chordata
- Class: Actinopterygii
- Order: Cichliformes
- Family: Cichlidae
- Tribe: Heroini
- Genus: Hoplarchus; Kaup, 1860
- Species: H. psittacus

Binomial name
- Hoplarchus psittacus (Heckel, 1840)

Synonyms
- Heros psittacus Heckel, 1840; Aequidens psittacus (Heckel, 1840); Centrarchus cychla Jardine, 1843; Hoplarchus pentacanthus Kaup, 1860

= Hoplarchus =

Genus of fishes

Hoplarchus is a genus of cichlid in the tribe Heroini. It contains the single species Hoplarchus psittacus, which is endemic to the blackwater rivers in Brazil, Colombia and Venezuela, including the Rio Negro, Jamari, Preto da Eva, Urubu rivers and upper Orinoco drainages. This fish can reach a length of 35 centimetres (14 in) TL and is important as a food fish to local indigenous peoples. This species is occasionally kept as an aquarium fish and is traded under the common name "parrot cichlid" (a name also used for one other species and a hybrid fish).
