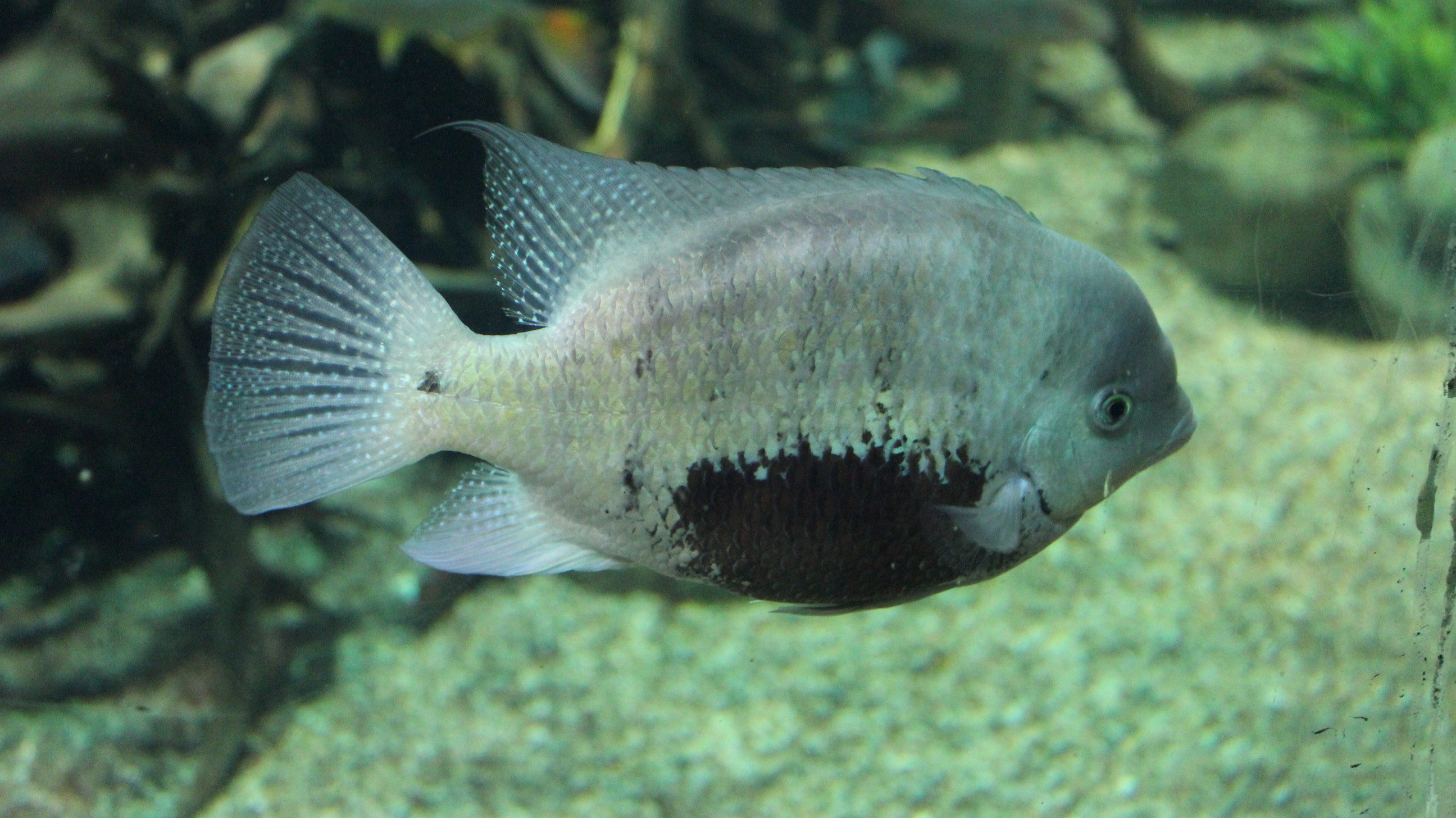

Conservation status
- Least Concern (IUCN 3.1)

Scientific classification
- Kingdom: Animalia
- Phylum: Chordata
- Class: Actinopterygii
- Order: Cichliformes
- Family: Cichlidae
- Genus: Cincelichthys
- Species: C. pearsei

Binomial name
- Cincelichthys pearsei (C. L. Hubbs, 1936)

Synonyms
- Cichlasoma pearsei; Herichthys pearsei

= Cincelichthys pearsei =

Species of fish

Cincelichthys pearsei, the Pantano cichlid, is a species of fish in the family Cichlidae from the Usumacinta River basin in southern Mexico and northern Guatemala.

== Size ==
Males can reach up to 42 cm (17 in) in length while females are smaller at around 35 cm (14 in).

== Habitat ==
It inhabits lakes and river basins where aquatic plant life is abundant. It has also been recorded in brackish water but it remains unknown whether it can tolerate such conditions for longer periods of time. It is a herbivorous fish that feeds on both aquatic and land plants and also algae.

== Etymology ==
The fish is named in honor of animal ecologist Arthur Sperry Pearse (1877–1956), the leader of the Yucatán expedition during which the type was collected, he was known as an "explorer of many lands and of many fields of science".
