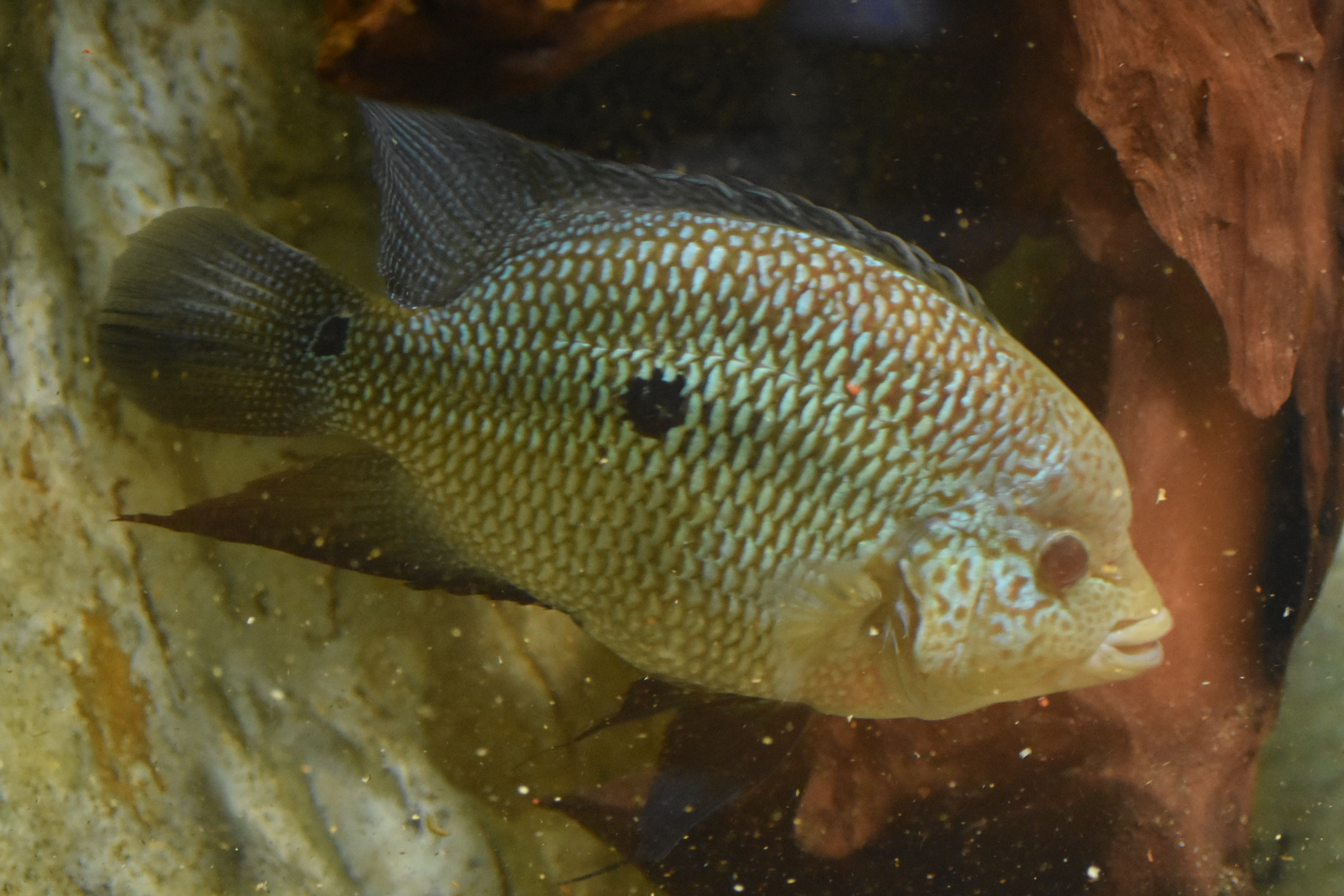

Conservation status
- Least Concern (IUCN 3.1)

Scientific classification
- Kingdom: Animalia
- Phylum: Chordata
- Class: Actinopterygii
- Order: Cichliformes
- Family: Cichlidae
- Genus: Kronoheros; Říčan & Piálek, 2016
- Species: K. umbriferus

Binomial name
- Kronoheros umbriferus (Meek & Hildebrand, 1913)

Synonyms
- Caquetaia umbrifera Meek & Hildebrand, 1913; Cichlasoma umbriferum Meek & Hildebrand, 1913

= Turquoise cichlid =

Species of fish

The turquoise cichlid (Kronoheros umbriferus), also known as the umbee cichlid, is a species of cichlid fish found in freshwater habitats of eastern Panama and central and western Colombia. It is commonly caught as a food fish, and sometimes kept in aquariums. This robust fish is the largest cichlid native to its range, up to 12 kg (26 lb) in weight and 80 cm (2.6 ft) long, and in the Americas only certain peacock bass and the wolf cichlid may reach a greater size. Females of the turquoise cichlid remain significantly smaller than males. It is strongly predatory, typically feeding on fish and other small animals, but it may also take fruits and seeds.

== Taxonomy and appearance ==
This cichlid was first scientifically described in 1913 based on specimens from the Cupe River, which is a part of the Tuira River basin in Panama. It was placed in Cichlasoma, which at the time was a wastebasket genus. As the species clearly belonged elsewhere, it was subsequently moved to Heros or Caquetaia, until finally being moved to its own genus Kronoheros in 2016.

It is currently the only recognized species in the genus Kronoheros, but it is likely it will be split into at least two separate species, as there are significant variations in the appearance and genetic studies have shown clear differences between those from the Tuira River of Panama and the Atrato River of Colombia (genetic data is lacking for other populations).

Adults have an iridescent light-spotted pattern, but the extent and color hue varies. It can roughly be divided into three main groups, each with some minor subgroups. Their differences are most obvious in adult males and less so in adult females, whereas young are similar. The first group includes those from Panama and is sometimes known as the Panama green umbee. These have silvery spotting on the body and are quite yellowish overall, especially on the face and operculum, which lack silvery, turquoise or dark red spotting/speckling. The second group includes Colombian individuals from the Chocó region, the northwest (including Atrato River) and locally near San Rafael (where possibly introduced; this region is part of the Magdalena basin that otherwise is inhabited by the third group), and is sometimes known as the black umbee or black gorillus. These are quite dark overall with a body covered in turquoise-blue spots, and dark reddish speckles on the head and operculum. The third group is found widely in the Magdalena basin of Colombia and is the type best known in the aquarium trade. It is the "true" turquoise cichlid (although if split, the scientific name Kronoheros umbriferus belongs to the Panama population) and it is also known as the blue umbee. As suggested by the names, they are densely covered in turquoise-blue spots, including some on the face and operculum.
