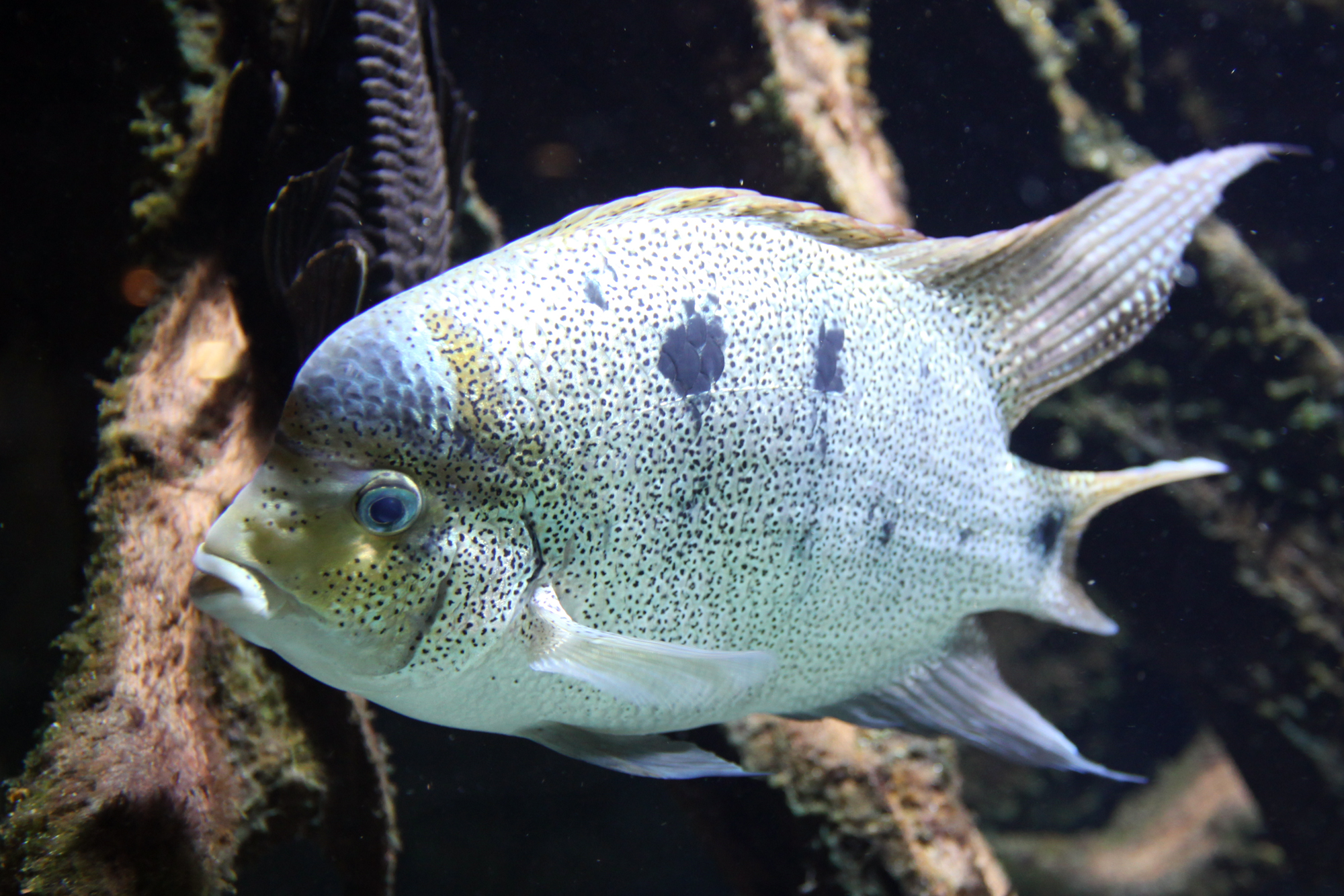
- Maskaheros argenteus

Scientific classification
- Domain: Eukaryota
- Kingdom: Animalia
- Phylum: Chordata
- Class: Actinopterygii
- Order: Cichliformes
- Family: Cichlidae
- Tribe: Heroini
- Genus: Maskaheros; McMahan & K. R. Piller, 2015

Type species
- Viela argentea Allgayer, 1991

= Maskaheros =

Genus of fishes

Maskaheros is a genus of cichlids fish found on Atlantic slope of southern Mexico and Guatemala in the Coatzacoalcos and Usumacinta River drainages. They are relatively large, high-bodied cichlids and were formerly included in the genus Paraneetroplus or Vieja.

== Species ==
There are currently 2 recognized species in this genus:

- Maskaheros argenteus (Allgayer, 1991) (White cichlid)
- Maskaheros regani (R. R. Miller, 1974) (Almoloya cichlid)
