= Tomocichla =

Scientific classification
- Domain: Eukaryota
- Kingdom: Animalia
- Phylum: Chordata
- Class: Actinopterygii
- Order: Cichliformes
- Family: Cichlidae
- Tribe: Heroini
- Genus: Tomocichla; Regan, 1908

Type species
- Tomocichla underwoodi Regan, 1908

Genus of fishes

Tomocichla is a genus of cichlid fish native to moderately and fast-flowing rivers along the Atlantic slope of Central America, ranging from the Escondido drainage in Nicaragua to Bocas del Toro in Panama. Tomocichla was formerly included in Theraps (and even earlier in Cichlasoma) and until 2015 Talamancaheros sieboldii was commonly included in Tomocichla. They are fairly large cichlids, up to 25–30 cm (10–12 in) in length.

== Species ==
There are currently 2 recognized species in this genus:

- Tomocichla asfraci Allgayer, 2002
- Tomocichla tuba (Meek, 1912) (Tuba cichlid)
