= Bluemouth cichlid =

Conservation status
- Least Concern (IUCN 3.1)

Scientific classification
- Kingdom: Animalia
- Phylum: Chordata
- Class: Actinopterygii
- Order: Cichliformes
- Family: Cichlidae
- Subfamily: Cichlinae
- Tribe: Heroini
- Genus: Wajpamheros
- Species: W. nourissati

Binomial name
- Wajpamheros nourissati (Allgayer, 1989)

Synonyms
- Theraps nourissati Allgayer, 1989; Amphilophus nourissati (Allgayer, 1989); Cichlasoma nourissati (Allgayer, 1989)

Species of fish

The bluemouth cichlid (Wajpamheros nourissati) is a species of cichlid fish that is endemic to the Usumacinta River basin in southern Mexico and Guatemala, where it is widely distributed in rivers, creeks and lakes. This species is the only known member of its genus. The specific name honours the French cichlid specialist Jean Claude Nourissat (1942-2003), who collected type of this species. It reaches up to 22 cm (8.7 in) in total length.
