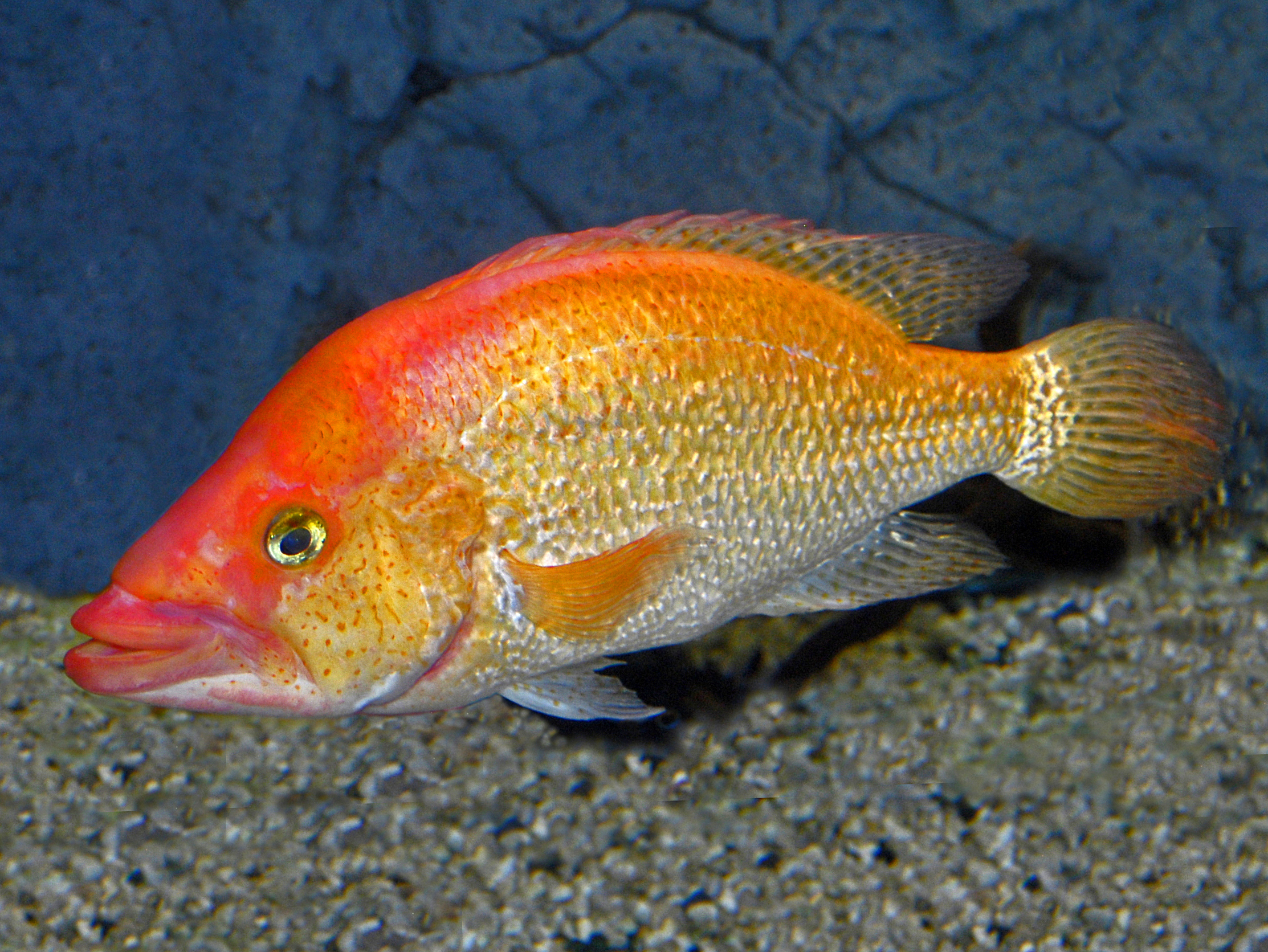
- Petenia splendida

Conservation status
- Least Concern (IUCN 3.1)

Scientific classification
- Kingdom: Animalia
- Phylum: Chordata
- Class: Actinopterygii
- Division: Teleostei
- Order: Cichliformes
- Family: Cichlidae
- Genus: Petenia; Günther, 1862
- Species: P. splendida

Binomial name
- Petenia splendida Günther, 1862

= Petenia splendida =

Species of fish

Petenia splendida, the bay snook, is a species of cichlid from Guatemala and northern Central America. It is important to local commercial fisheries.

== Description ==
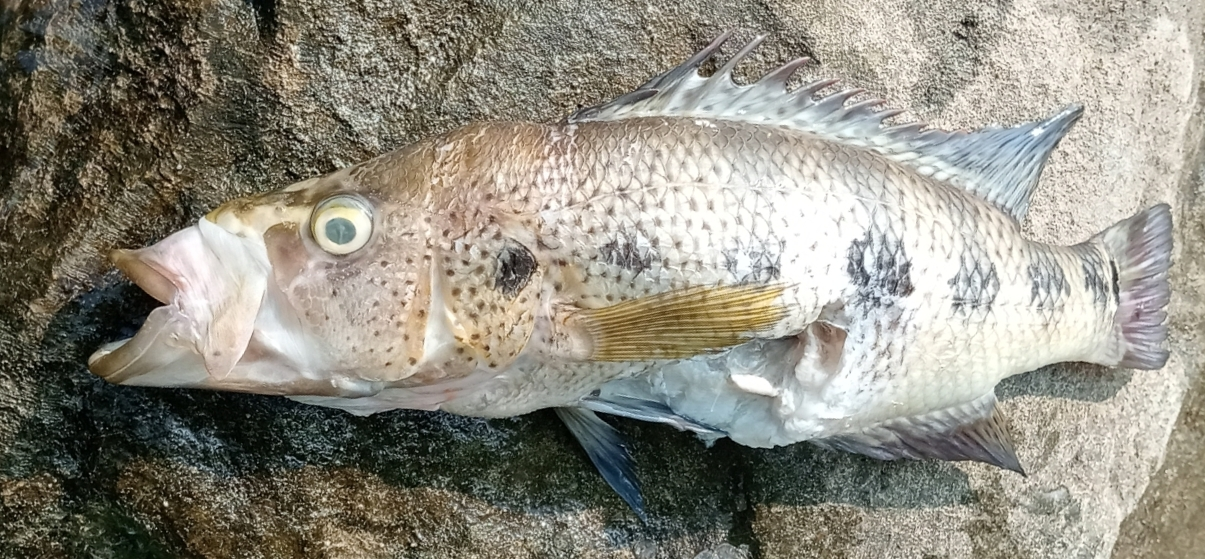
Showing jaw protrusion

This piscivorous species can reach a length of 50 centimetres (20 in) SL. These fishes have a laterally compressed body, with an elongated head and a prominent jaw. The fins are large and rounded. The basic coloration varies from pale pink to deep red to gold. Males are a bit larger than females, with a more accentuated red coloration. Females are usually rounder. The special feature of this species is in the jaws that are extensible to more than 1/4 of the length of the entire body, which allows to prey fishes of considerable size but also to suck small fishes directly into the mouth.

== Distribution and habitat ==
This species is native to the Atlantic slope of tropical Mexico, Guatemala and Belize. It prefers slower-moving areas of rivers and lakes.

== Bibliography ==
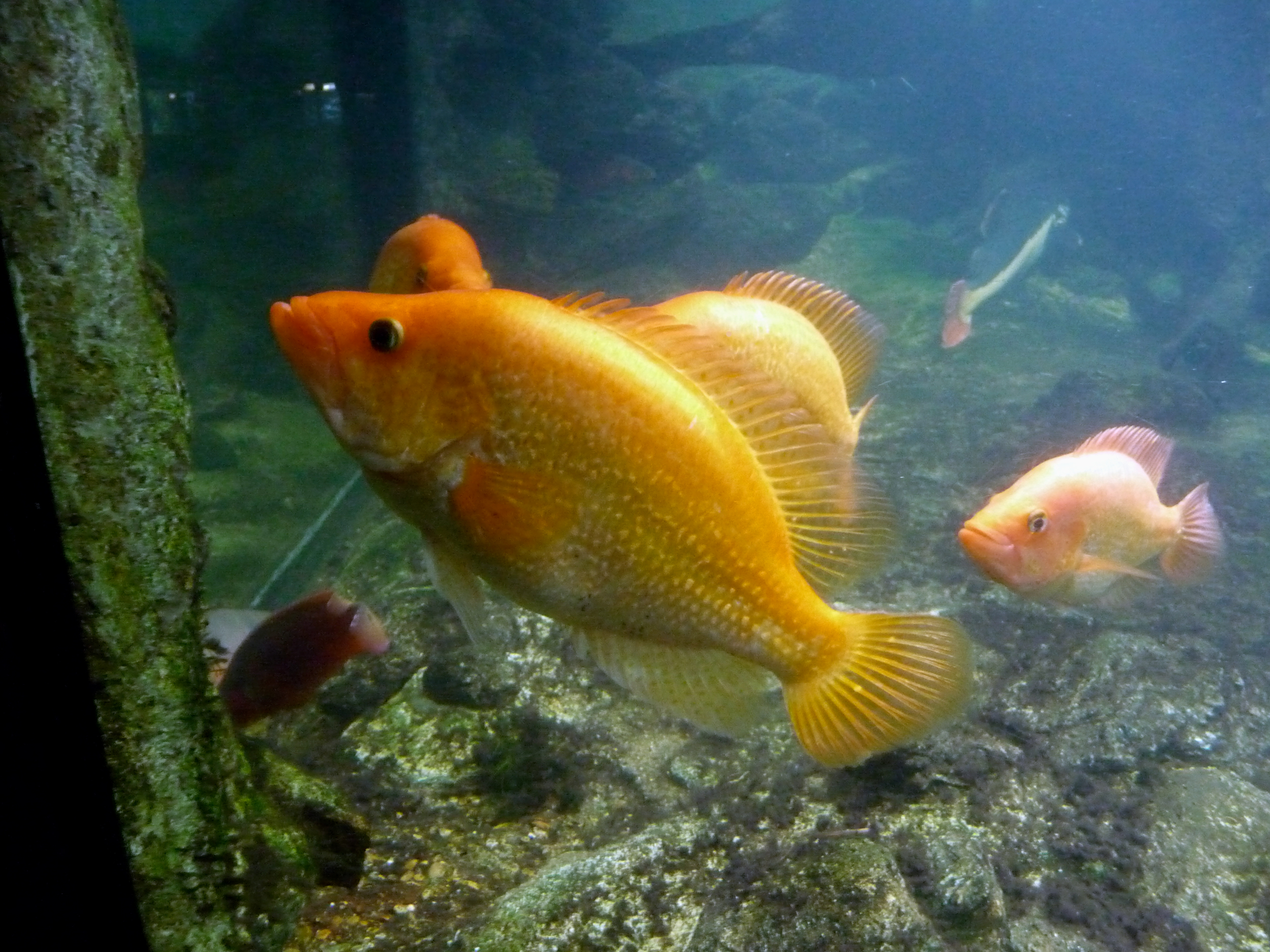
Petenia splendida

- Eschmeyer, William N., ed. 1998. Catalog of Fishes. Special Publication of the Center for Biodiversity Research and Information, núm. 1, vol. 1–3. California Academy of Sciences. San Francisco, California, USA. 2905. ISBN 0-940228-47-5.
- Fenner, Robert M.: The Conscientious Marine Aquarist. Neptune City, New Jersey, USA : T.F.H. Publications, 2001.
- Helfman, G., B. Collette y D. Facey: The diversity of fishes. Blackwell Science, Malden, Massachusetts, USA, 1997.
- Hoese, D.F. 1986: . A M.M. Smith y P.C. Heemstra (eds.) Smiths' sea fishes. Springer-Verlag, Berlin, Germany.
- Maugé, L.A. 1986. A J. Daget, J.-P. Gosse y D.F.E. Thys van den Audenaerde (eds.) Check-list of the freshwater fishes of Africa (CLOFFA). ISNB, Brussels; MRAC, Tervuren; y ORSTOM, Paris, France. Vol. 2.
- Moyle, P. y J. Cech.: Fishes: An Introduction to Ichthyology, 4th. Ed., Upper Saddle River, New Jersey, USA: Prentice-Hall.
- Nelson, J.: Fishes of the World, 3rd ed. New York, USA: John Wiley and Sons.
- Wheeler, A.: The World Encyclopedia of Fishes, 2nd. Ed., London: Macdonald.
