= Rheoheros =

Scientific classification
- Kingdom: Animalia
- Phylum: Chordata
- Class: Actinopterygii
- Order: Cichliformes
- Family: Cichlidae
- Tribe: Heroini
- Genus: Rheoheros; McMahan & Matamoros, 2015

Type species
- Heros lentiginosus Steindachner, 1864

Genus of fishes

Rheoheros is a genus of cichlids. These freshwater fish are found in the Atlantic slope of Mexico and Guatemala in moderately to fast-flowing waters of the Grijalva-Usumacinta River system. Depending on species, they reach up to 12–25 cm (4.5–10 in) in length.

== Species ==
There are currently 2 recognized species in this genus:

- Rheoheros coeruleus (Stawikowski & U. Werner, 1987)
- Rheoheros lentiginosus (Steindachner, 1864) (Freckled cichlid)
