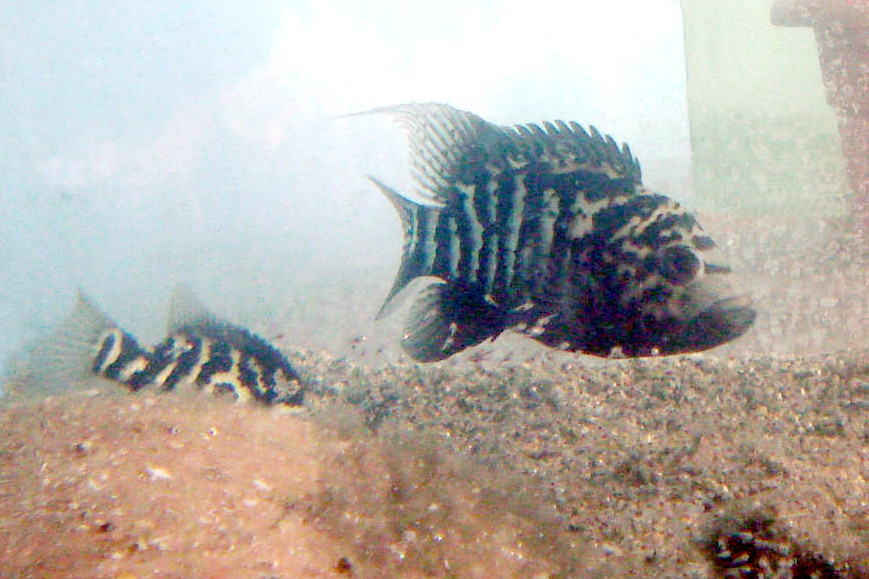
- Biajaca (N. tetracantus)

Scientific classification
- Kingdom: Animalia
- Phylum: Chordata
- Class: Actinopterygii
- Order: Cichliformes
- Family: Cichlidae
- Tribe: Heroini
- Genus: Nandopsis; T. N. Gill, 1862

Type species
- Centrarchus tetracanthus Valenciennes, 1831

= Nandopsis =

Nandopsis Temporal range: 24.7–0 Ma Late Oligocene–present

Genus of fishes

Nandopsis is a small genus of cichlid fishes found in lakes, streams and rivers in Cuba and Hispaniola. Nandopsis are the only cichlids native to the Antilles.

== Species ==
The genus currently contains three extant species, as well as one fossil species from the late Oligocene epoch. An additional species, N. vombergae is recognized by some, but considered a synonym of N. haitiensis by FishBase.

- Nandopsis haitiensis (Tee-Van, 1935) (Haitian cichlid) - Hispaniola (Dominican Republic and Haiti)
- Nandopsis ramsdeni (Fowler, 1938) (Joturo) - Cuba
- Nandopsis tetracanthus (Valenciennes, 1831) (Biajaca) - Cuba
- † Nandopsis woodringi Graham, 1990 (Haiti)
