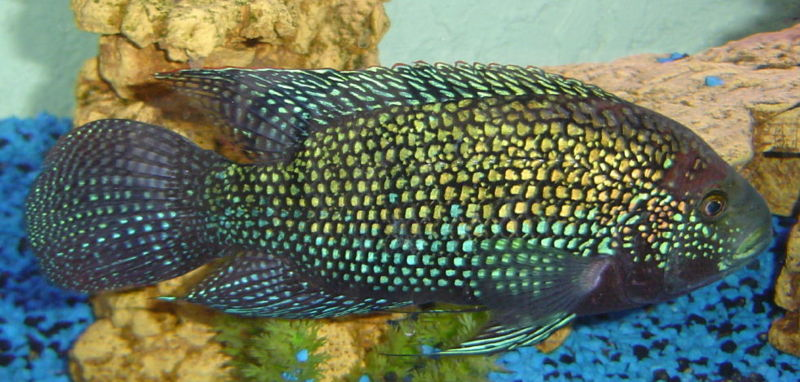
- Male

Conservation status
- Least Concern (IUCN 3.1)

Scientific classification
- Kingdom: Animalia
- Phylum: Chordata
- Class: Actinopterygii
- Order: Cichliformes
- Family: Cichlidae
- Genus: Rocio
- Species: R. octofasciata

Binomial name
- Rocio octofasciata (Regan, 1903)

Synonyms
- List: Heros octofasciatus Regan, 1903; Archocentrus octofasciatus (Regan, 1903); Cichlasoma octofasciatum (Regan, 1903); Cichlasoma octofasciatus (Regan, 1903); Nandopsis octofasciata (Regan, 1903); Parapetenia octofasciata (Regan, 1903); Cichlasoma hedricki Meek, 1904; Cichlosoma biocellatum Regan, 1909; Cichlasoma biocellatum Regan, 1909

= Jack Dempsey (fish) =

Species of fish

The Jack Dempsey (Rocio octofasciata) is a species of cichlid fish that is native to freshwater habitats from southern Mexico to Honduras, but also introduced elsewhere. Its common name refers to its aggressive nature and strong facial features, likened to that of the famous 1920s boxer Jack Dempsey.

== Distribution ==
The fish is native to freshwater habitats from southern Mexico to Honduras, where it is found in slow-moving waters, such as swampy areas with warm, murky water, weedy, mud- and sand-bottomed canals, drainage ditches, and rivers. It is also established as an introduced species in Australia, the United States and Thailand (presumably as an aquarium escapee) These are locally known as the Mexican Blue Frontosa.

== Ecology ==
The Jack Dempsey natively lives in a tropical climate and prefers water with a pH of 6–7, a water hardness of 9–20 dGH, and a temperature range of 22–30 °C (72–86 °F). Males can reach up to 10 inches (25 cm) in length. It is carnivorous, eating worms, crustaceans, insects and other fish. In the wild they are found in warm murky water including mangroves and the lower reaches of rivers and streams.

=== Impacts ===
The features that make cichlids popular pets are also those that contribute to their invasive potential: 'they are hardy, adaptable and breed prolifically'.

Cichlids have the potential to dominate native fish populations through their aggressive behaviour and competition for food and space. They eat almost anything smaller than themselves, including fish, invertebrates and frogs . As relatively large and aggressive carnivores they could have devastating impacts on native fish populations if they spread to other waterways, such as the nearby Clarence River.

Cichlids also have the potential to introduce disease into wild fish populations. Many pathogens and parasites have been recorded in imported ornamental fish in quarantine and post-quarantine in Australia.

Social and economic impacts include the costs of control, impacts on recreationally valued fish, including the spread of disease.

== Reproduction ==
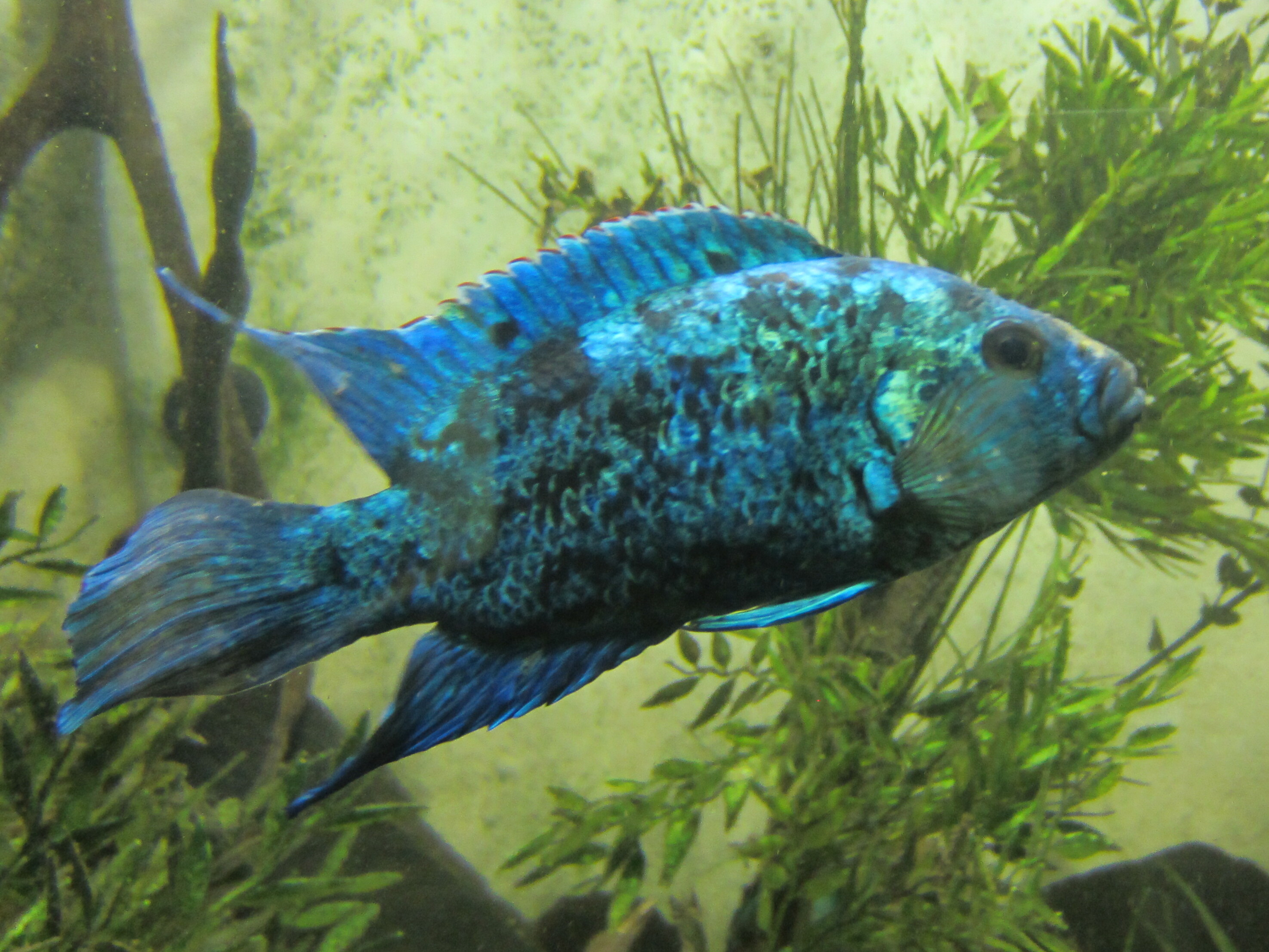
"Electric Blue" morph

Jack Dempseys lay their eggs on a flat hard surface within their territory, such as rocks, logs, or the glass bottom of an aquarium. Like most cichlids, they show substantial parental care: both parents help incubate the eggs and guard the fry when they hatch. Jack Dempseys are known to be attentive parents, pre-chewing food to feed to their offspring. However, it is not uncommon for them to eat their fry when the breeding pair are overly disturbed or something in their environment is wrong.

Females lay approximately 500–800 eggs per clutch. The eggs are protected by both parents, which are extremely aggressive towards other fish during the spawning season.

== Morphology ==
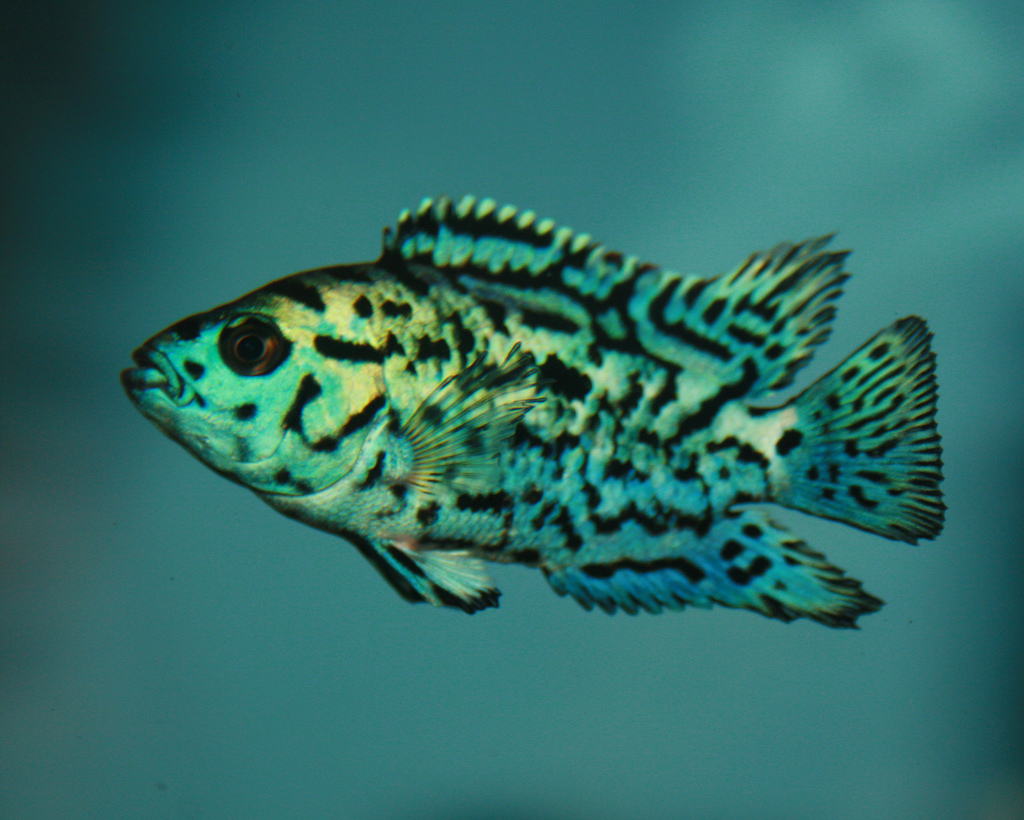
Juvenile "Electric Blue" morph

The coloration changes as the fish matures from a light gray or tan with faint turquoise flecks to a dark purple-gray with very bright, iridescent blue, green, and gold flecks. Their colors change under stress. The dorsal and anal fins of mature males have long, pointed tips. Females lack these exaggerated tips. During breeding both genders considerably darken in color, appearing almost black with little to no metallic coloration.

Different variations of color are also available on the aquarium market. Color variants include Gold, Electric Blue, and pink (a fish that displays both gold & blue traits).

Jack Dempsey cichlids are a medium-sized fish which can be distinguished from other cichlids by the presence of two grey-black bars on the top of their head which extend forward between their eyes. Their background colour is dark blue and they have a series of white to iridescent blue spots on their fins, head and body, and a series of dark bars along their sides.

== In the aquarium ==
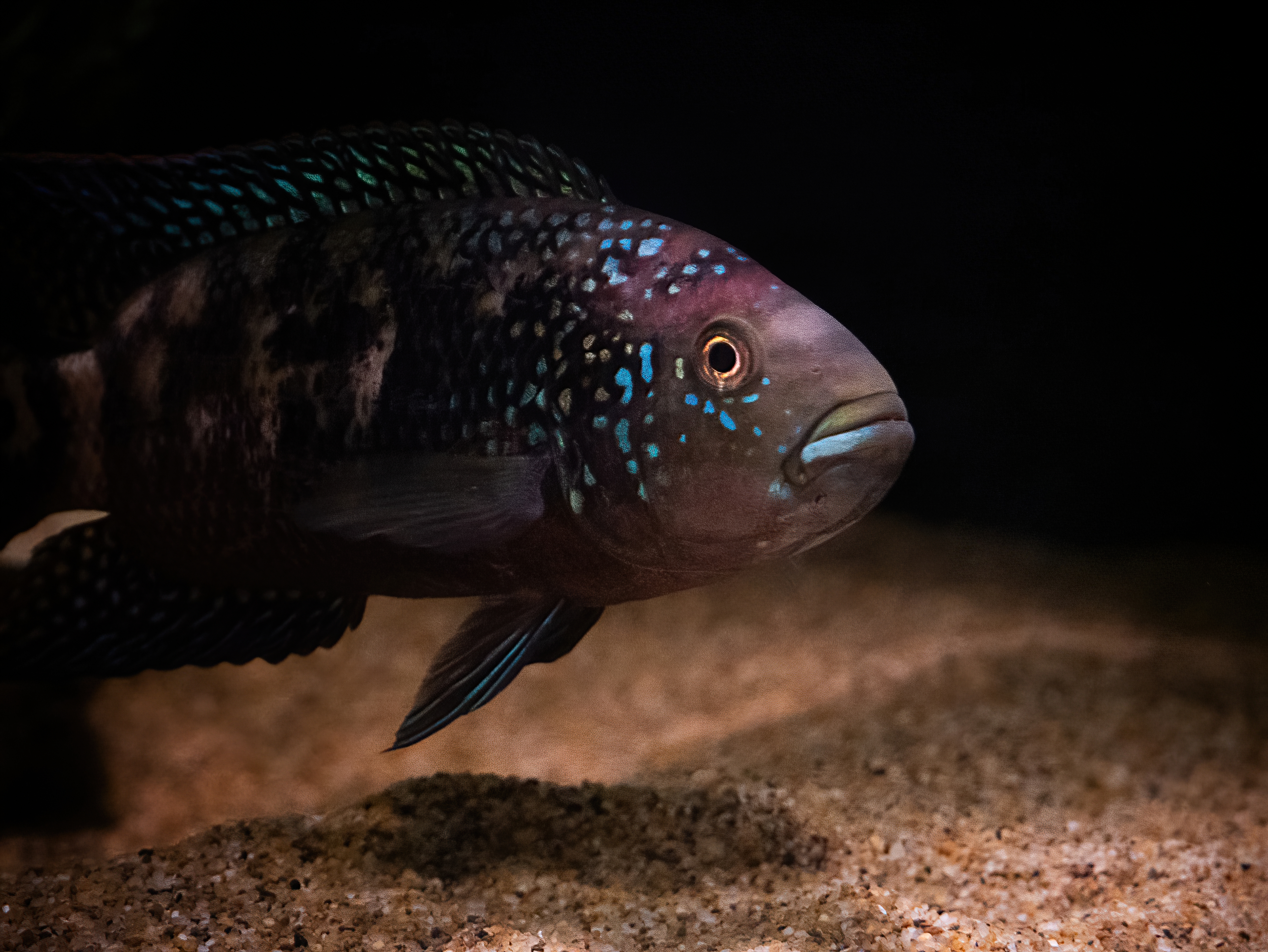
A dim light and dark substrate will bring out the colors of the Jack Dempsey.

The fish is a popular aquarium fish, due to its striking appearance and personable mannerisms. It, like most cichlids, is considered "aggressive", but can get along in a well-populated tank, tending to be more territorial if kept with only a few other fish, therefore allowed to easily establish and defend a "territory" in the tank. Jack Dempsey cichlids can often appear shy, hiding away in cave work. It is recommended that the Jack Dempsey cichlid is provided with plenty of places to hide. They will often claim a cave first and be very aggressive to other tank mates that swim near its home.

There is also a blue variant of this fish which commonly known as the blue Jack Dempsey or electric blue Jack Dempsey. This is a natural genetic mutation. The blue counterpart is less aggressive, smaller in size and more delicate.

== In Australia ==
Jack Dempsey cichlids were discovered in a flooded quarry in New South Wales (NSW) Australia in 2004 in the Angourie area, near Yamba on the NSW north coast. Although efforts were made to eradicate them in 2004 and 2005, the fish remain. Jack Dempsey cichlids are one of about 30 aquarium fish species that have become established in Australian waterways, and have been shown to have a significant impact on Australian aquatic ecosystems. They highlight the importance of preventing the importation of invasive fish species because they are extremely difficult or impossible to eradicate once they become established in the wild.

In Australia, they are a popular aquarium fish typically sold to tropical freshwater tanks, although their aggressive nature means they 'are not suitable for community tanks'. Because Jack Dempsey cichlids are popular pets there is little doubt that this population established from illegally released aquarium fish. They can live more than 10 years and can reach 25 cm in length. They prefer temperatures of between 22 and 30 °C, but can survive in temperatures as low as 8–10 °C.

=== Eradication attempts ===
When Jack Dempseys were first discovered in the Green Pool, Angourie the NSW Department of Primary Industries (DPI) considered them to be a good target for eradication because the pool was relatively small, confined, and contained few native fish. Three eradication attempts were carried out between September 2004 and June 2005 using explosives. Large Australian bass were then released into the pool to prey on any remaining larvae or juveniles that were not killed by the blasts.

Follow up monitoring by the NSW DPI has found Jack Dempsey cichlids remain in the pool. It is possible that some fish survived eradication attempts or that they were deliberately re-introduced. According to the NSW DPI, no further eradication work is planned.

=== Biosecurity ===
There are growing concerns about the ongoing importation of aquarium fish such as Jack Dempsey cichlids into Australia. More than two-thirds of naturalised non-native fish in Australia are thought to have come from the aquarium trade, and non-native fish species are 'implicated in the decline of 42 per cent of Australian native fish and several frog species'. On the basis of significant potential impacts on biodiversity, the Australian Government's Threatened Species Scientific Committee determined that the process of introducing fish outside their natural geographic distribution met the criteria for listing as a key threatening process (KTP). However, the process has not yet been listed as a KTP, and several hundred aquarium fish species continue to be permitted for import into Australia, including more than 250 freshwater species. In 2004–05 alone, 15 million fish were imported.

According to experts, a large part of the problem stems from inadequate import assessments and controls. For example, an extensive review of introduced aquarium fish in Australia concluded that assessments are 'based on information obtained overseas and are likely to be of limited value in predicting the likelihood of environmental impacts in Australian waters'. In assessing the case for revised import controls – particularly in the context of introduced diseases, scientists recommended that 'the number of species traded and the number of sources permitted need to be dramatically reduced to facilitate hazard identification, risk assessment and import quarantine controls.'

== See also ==
- List of freshwater aquarium fish species
