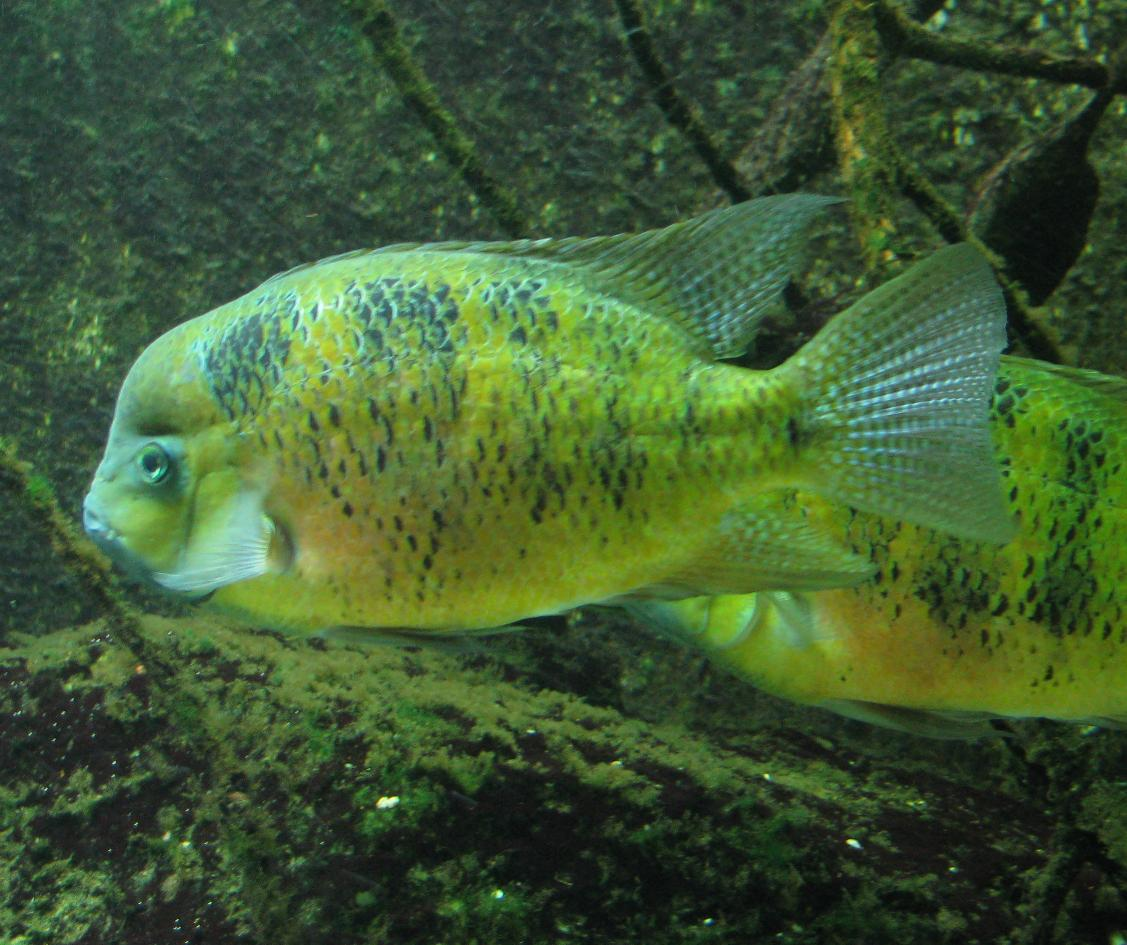
- Cincelichthys bocourti

Scientific classification
- Kingdom: Animalia
- Phylum: Chordata
- Class: Actinopterygii
- Order: Cichliformes
- Family: Cichlidae
- Subfamily: Cichlinae
- Tribe: Heroini
- Genus: Cincelichthys; McMahan & K. R. Piller, 2015

Type species
- Neetroplus bocourti Vaillant & Pellegrin, 1902

Synonyms
- Kihnichthys

= Cincelichthys =

Genus of fishes

Cincelichthys is a genus of high-bodied cichlids found in southern Mexico to Guatemala, where they inhabit lakes, rivers (typically sluggish) and other freshwater habitats. They are large cichlids, up to 35–42.5 cm (14–17 in) long depending on species, with females reaching smaller sizes than males.

They feed on vegetable matter, like fruits, parts of aquatic and land plants, and algae. They share their chisel-like teeth with Kihnichthys and whether they should be merged into a single genus is not yet fully resolved. A review in 2020 recommended that Kihnichthys should be moved into Cincelichthys.

== Species ==
There are currently 2 recognized species in this genus:

- Cincelichthys bocourti (Vaillant & Pellegrin, 1902) (Chisel-tooth cichlid)
- Cincelichthys pearsei (C. L. Hubbs, 1936) (Pantano cichlid)
