= Kihnichthys =

Conservation status
- Data Deficient (IUCN 3.1)

Scientific classification
- Kingdom: Animalia
- Phylum: Chordata
- Class: Actinopterygii
- Order: Cichliformes
- Family: Cichlidae
- Genus: Kihnichthys; McMahan & Matamoros, 2015
- Species: K. ufermanni

Binomial name
- Kihnichthys ufermanni (Allgayer, 2002)

Synonyms
- Cichlasoma ufermanni Allgayer, 2002; Theraps ufermanni Allgayer, 2002

Genus of fishes

Kihnichthys ufermanni, the Usumacinta cichlid, is a species of cichlid found in a few rivers in the Usumacinta River basin in Guatemala and southern Mexico. It typically occurs in rivers that are about 10–50 m (33–164 ft) wide, fairly deep, have few or no aquatic plants, and a variable water current. This species is the only known member of its genus, but several of its features, including the chisel-like teeth, are shared with Cincelichthys and whether they should be merged into a single genus is not yet fully resolved; a review in 2020 recommended that the Usumacinta cichlid should be moved into Cincelichthys. The Usumacinta cichlid reaches a standard length of 25 cm (10 in).

The generic name honours the Guatemalan ichthyologist Herman A. Kihn while the specific name honours the German aquarist, and friend of Robert Allgayer's, Alfred Ufermann who died in 2000.
