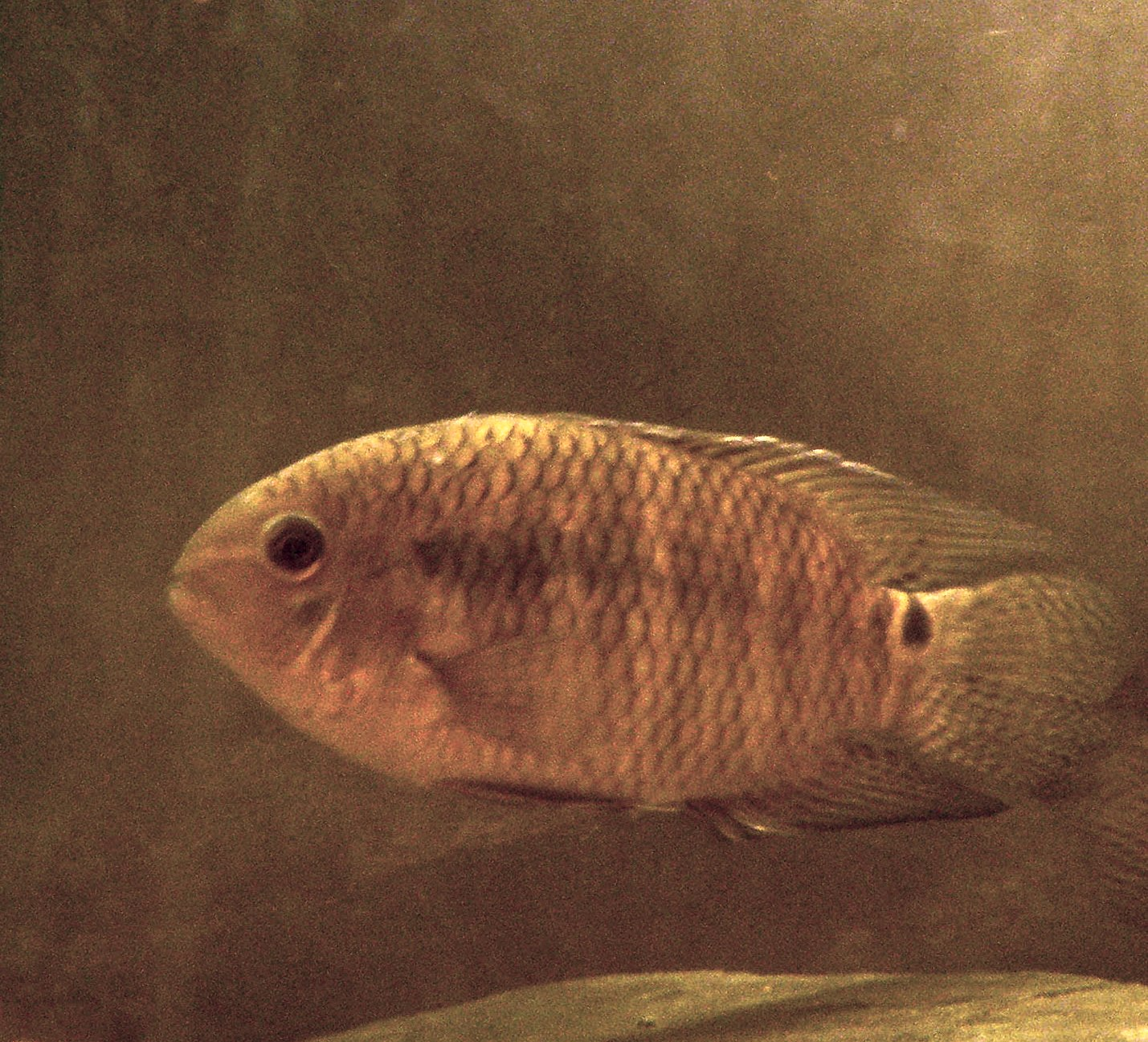
- Cichlasoma dimerus

Scientific classification
- Kingdom: Animalia
- Phylum: Chordata
- Class: Actinopterygii
- Order: Cichliformes
- Family: Cichlidae
- Tribe: Cichlasomatini
- Genus: Cichlasoma; Swainson, 1839

Type species
- Labrus bimaculatus Linnaeus, 1758

= Cichlasoma =

Genus of fishes

Cichlasoma is a genus of freshwater fish in the cichlid family. The genus was previously very large (a wastebasket taxon), including cichlids from North America, including Central America, and South America.

Reclassification and subsequent splitting of the genus by Sven O. Kullander and other ichthyologists has resulted in removing many of the former species from Cichlasoma to genera such as Amphilophus, Archocentrus, Herichthys, Heros, Nandopsis, Parachromis, Thorichthys, Vieja and others in the tribe Heroini.

== Species ==
According to FishBase, there are currently sixteen recognized species in this genus, but three very different Middle American taxa ("C." geddesi a synonym of Herichthys deppii, and "C." istlanum and "C." trimaculatum placed in Amphilophus) are not included by Catalog of Fishes, effectively limiting Cichlasoma to a group of rather similar, medium-small cichlids of South America.

- Cichlasoma amazonarum S. O. Kullander, 1983
- Cichlasoma araguaiense S. O. Kullander, 1983
- Cichlasoma bimaculatum (Linnaeus, 1758) (Black acara)
- Cichlasoma boliviense S. O. Kullander, 1983
- Cichlasoma dimerus (Heckel, 1840)
- Cichlasoma geddesi (Regan, 1905)
- Cichlasoma istlanum (D. S. Jordan & Snyder, 1899)
- Cichlasoma orientale S. O. Kullander, 1983
- Cichlasoma orinocense S. O. Kullander, 1983
- Cichlasoma paranaense S. O. Kullander, 1983
- Cichlasoma portalegrense (R. F. Hensel, 1870)
- Cichlasoma pusillum S. O. Kullander, 1983
- Cichlasoma santifranciscense S. O. Kullander, 1983
- Cichlasoma taenia (E. T. Bennett, 1831) (Brown coscarob)
- Cichlasoma zarskei Ottoni, 2011
