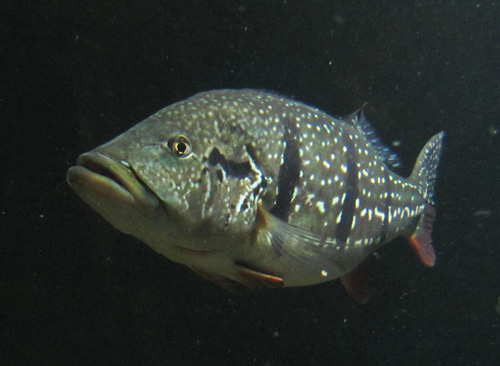

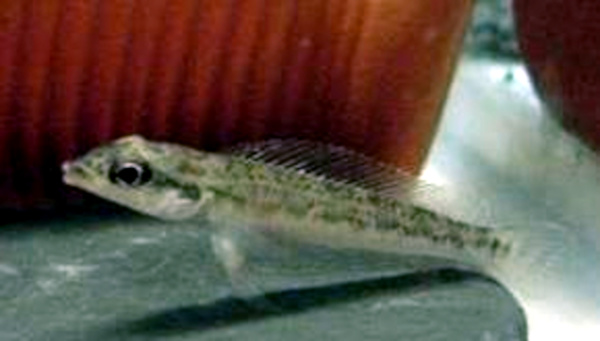
- Two extremes from the subfamily: one of the largest cichlids Cichla temensis above, and the tiny Teleocichla cinderella below

Scientific classification
- Kingdom: Animalia
- Phylum: Chordata
- Class: Actinopterygii
- Order: Cichliformes
- Family: Cichlidae
- Subfamily: Cichlinae; Bonaparte 1835

Tribes
- see text

= Cichlinae =

Cichlinae Temporal range: 48.6–0 Ma

Subfamily of fishes

The Cichlinae are a subfamily of fishes in the cichlid family, native to Central and South America.

This subfamily consists of approximately 117 described species as of July 2017. Some authors have suggested that the Cichlinae encompasses all of the Neotropical Cichlids and found the taxon to be monophyletic and to be divided into seven tribes: Astronotini, Chaetobranchini, Cichlasomatini, Cichlini, Geophagini, Heroini, and Retroculini. In this system the Geophaginae plus the Chaetobranchini were recovered as the sister taxon to the clade consisting of the Heroini plus the Cichlatsomatini, these latter two being referred to as the subfamily Cichlasomatinae in some classifications, while the monogeneric Astronotini was a sister taxon to these four, while the Cichlini and Retroculini made up a sister clade of the other five.

== Tribes ==
The following tribes make up the subfamily Cichlinae:

- Cichlini
- Retroculini
- Astronotini
- Chaetobranchini
- Geophagini
- Cichlasomatini
- Heroini

== See also ==
- Cichlid fish by location
