= Barton's cichlid =

Conservation status
- Endangered (IUCN 3.1)

Scientific classification
- Kingdom: Animalia
- Phylum: Chordata
- Class: Actinopterygii
- Division: Teleostei
- Order: Cichliformes
- Family: Cichlidae
- Genus: Herichthys
- Species: H. bartoni

Binomial name
- Herichthys bartoni (T. H. Bean, 1892)

Synonyms
- Acara bartoni T.H. Bean, 1892; Cichlasoma bartoni (T.H. Bean, 1892); Nosferatu bartoni De la Maza-Benignos et al., 2015

Species of cichlid fish

Barton's cichlid (Herichthys bartoni) is a species of cichlid endemic to freshwater springs in the upper Panuco River basin of San Luis Potosí, Mexico.

== Taxonomy ==
=== Etymology and naming history ===
Barton's cichlid was originally discovered in 1890 by Mexican biologist Alfredo Dugès while he was traveling in Rioverde, San Luis Potosí. Four specimens were then collected and sent to ichthyologist Tarleton Hoffman Bean, who would go on to describe the species as Acara bartoni in 1802. The specific name, bartoni, is a patronym honoring Bean's brother, Barton Appler Bean, who was the assistant curator of ichthyology at the U.S. National Museum.

In May 2014, Mauricio De la Maza-Benignos released a phylogeographic analysis of the genus Herichthys, which argued that the H. bartoni group (consisting of itself, H. labridens, H. molango, H. pame, H. pantostictus, H. pratinus, and H. steindachneri), along with the then-newly described H. pame, should be moved from Hericthys to a new genus, Nosferatu, on the basis of their shared monophyly and tooth morphology. This assertion was refuted by a morphometric and phylogenetic review of the H. bartoni group conducted by Mejía et al. in March 2015, which showed that the diagnostic characteristics of Nosferatu were plesiomorphic with some Herichthys species outside of the H. bartoni group, and therefore would make Nosferatu a paraphyletic group congeneric with Herichthys. This was later upheld by Oldřich Říčan's 2016 revision of the molecular phylogeny of the tribe Heroini. Nosferatu is now considered to be an invalid synonym of Hericthys by Eschmeyer's Catalog of Fishes and FishBase, and Barton's cichlid is once again considered a member of Herichthys.

In its native Mexico, it is commonly known as the "mojarra caracolera" (transl. "snail mojarra") or the Media Luna cichlid.

=== Evolutionary history ===
Herichthys bartoni forms a species complex with the subpopulation of Herichthys labridens found in the laguna (Note: In Latin America, the term "laguna" is typically used to refer to small freshwater lakes rather than the coastal bodies of water the term "lagoon" refers to in English. La Media Luna is ~230 km (140 mi) inland, and does not border the ocean.) of La Media Luna, with the two having a genetic distance of only 0.2%. Their last common ancestor is believed to have diverged from the rest of Herichthys approximately ~3 million years ago (Mya), during the Pliocene (Note: Maza-Benignos et al. state this divergence happened during the Miocene. However, this would be impossible with the figures they give: their 95% HPD interval of 1.5–4.7 Mya does not overlap with the commonly-accepted 23.03–5.333 Mya span of the Miocene at any point. Take their estimates with a grain of salt.) era, and their speciation is believed to have only happened within the past ~1 million years. Mitochondrial DNA analysis further suggests that the two species hybridized relatively recently.

== Description ==
Herichthys bartoni can readily be distinguished from other members of the genus Herichthys by its black-and-white to light grey coloration in adulthood. However, this species is polymorphic, and yellow and blue color morphs occur in nature as well. This species is sexually dimorphic: males have darker body coloration than females, which darkens to a deep black during breeding season, causing them to resemble a tuxedo.

== Distribution and habitat ==
The distribution of Herichthys bartoni is restricted to the upper Panuco River basin, particularly the upper Rio Verde, La Media Luna, and its surrounding river systems.

== Ecology and behavior ==
Barton's cichlid is sympatric with its close relative Herichthys labridens, and is known to occur alongside several other species of fish, including the banded astynax (Psalidodon fasciatus), the blackstripe minnow (Tampichthys rasconis), the Rio Verde catfish (Ictalurus mexicanus), the striped goodeid (Ataeniobius toweri), and the invasive tilapia (Oreochromis sp.).

== Conservation status ==
Due to its decreasing population size, narrow geographic distribution, and the ongoing deterioration of its natural habitat, the IUCN Red List considers Barton's cichlid to be an endangered species. It is protected by federal Mexican law as a "species at risk" under Regulatory Annex III of NOM-059-SEMARNAT-2010. On June 7, 2003, La Media Luna was declared a protected natural area of San Luis Potosí, administered by the Secretariat of Environment and Natural Resources (SEMARNAT); the IUCN estimates that somewhere between 71 and 80% of its total population lives within this protected area.

In June 1956, surveying conducted by Louisiana State University indicated that it was one of the most abundant species of fish in La Media Luna at the time, comprising roughly 40% of the fish collected in the area. By 2006, however, its abundance in the area had plummeted to just 3.6%, and in 2017, it was determined to be one of the least abundant species in the laguna's nearby streams, creeks, and rivers.
