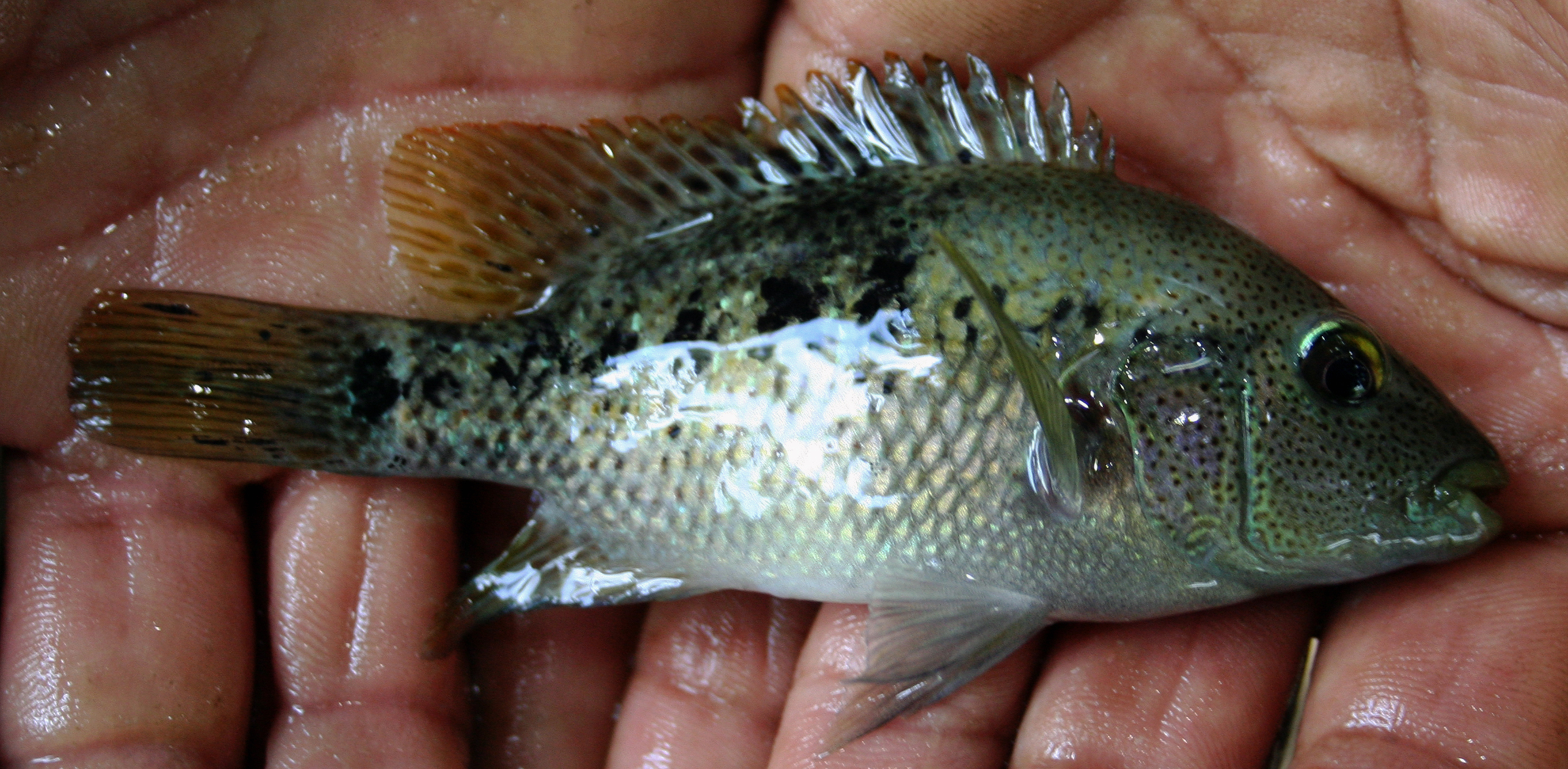
- Nosferatu pame

Scientific classification
- Kingdom: Animalia
- Phylum: Chordata
- Class: Actinopterygii
- Division: Teleostei
- Order: Cichliformes
- Family: Cichlidae
- Tribe: Heroini
- Genus: Nosferatu; De la Maza-Benignos, Ornelas-García, Lozano-Vilano, García-Ramírez & Doadrio, 2015

Type species
- Herichthys pame De la Maza-Benignos & Lozano-Vilano, 2013

= Nosferatu (fish) =

Proposed genus of fishes

Nosferatu is a proposed genus of cichlid fishes endemic to the Río Pánuco Basin and the tributaries of the adjacent Tamiahua Lagoon (to the South) and San Andrés Lagoon (to the North) in the states of Veracruz, Hidalgo, San Luis Potosí, Tamaulipas and Querétaro, Mexico. The genus is characterized by a prolongation in the size of the symphysial pair of teeth relative to that of the other teeth in the outer row of the upper jaw (nosferatuform teeth); breeding pigmentation that consists of darkening of ventral area extending over nostrils, opercular series, and pectoral fins; depressed dorsal fin rarely expands beyond anterior third of caudal fin; and an elongated, elastic, smooth caecum adhered to a saccular stomach.

All species in Nosferatu had previously belonged to genus Herichthys.

== Species ==
There were 7 species proposed for this genus:

- Nosferatu bartoni (T. H. Bean, 1892) (Barton's cichlid)
- Nosferatu labridens (Pellegrin, 1903) (Curve-bar cichlid)
- Nosferatu molango (De la Maza-Benignos & Lozano-Vilano, 2013) (Aztec cichlid)
- Nosferatu pame (De la Maza-Benignos & Lozano-Vilano, 2013)
- Nosferatu pantostictus (J. N. Taylor & R. R. Miller, 1983) (Chairel cichlid)
- Nosferatu pratinus (De la Maza-Benignos & Lozano-Vilano, 2013)
- Nosferatu steindachneri (D. S. Jordan & Snyder, 1899) (Steindachner's cichlid)

These species are currently placed in genus Herichthys.

== Phylogenetics ==
Separate analysis of the mitochondrial gene Cox1 by León-Romero et al. and by De la Maza-Benignos, et al. confirmed the monophyly of the genus group, and revealed the existence of three clades within: The paraphyletic bartoni clade, conformed by sympatric N. labridens and N. bartoni; the paraphyletic (in their study León-Romero et al. did not consider N. pame nor included N. pratinus and consequently report monophyly) steindachneri clade, conformed of the allopatric N. pratinus, and sympatric N. pame and N. steindachneri; and the monophyletic pantostictus clade (in the study by León-Romero et al. some of the lineages of N. pantostictus are misidentified as N. labridens; consequently they report polyphyly) composed of the nominal species N. pantostictus. In comparison to Herichthys, high levels of intrageneric divergence and structure within Nosferatu were revealed.

== Evolution ==
Divergence time for the split between Herichthys and Nosferatu has been estimated in ~5 Mya. During these times (i.e. Miocene-Pliocene), intense regional vulcanism led to the formation of the graben structure that conforms the sedimentary Rio Verde Basin; and the drain-less depression was filled by a number of endorheic shallow lakes, where Nosferatu evolved into the bartoni (~3 Mya), steindacheri (~2 Mya) and pantostictus (~2 Mya) clades. Later on (~1.8 Mya), as regional faulting rejoined the Rio Verde with the Pánuco Basin during the course of the Pleistocene, the genus re-invaded the Pánuco, this time with the evolved mechanisms of reproductive isolation that allows its sympatry with Herichthys.

== Name ==
The name of this genus, Nosferatu, was given because of the pair of well-developed recurved fangs in the upper jaw present possessed by all species of the genus; these were said to be reminiscent of those of Count Orlok in F. W. Murnau's Nosferatu.
