= Pame =

Pame or PAME may refer to:

- All-Workers Militant Front (PAME), a coordination centre within the Greek trade union movement
- All People Front (PAME), a political party in Greece
- Armstrong Pame, politician
- Nosferatu pame, a fish
- Pame language
- Pame people
- Primary amoebic meningoencephalitis
- Protection of the Arctic Marine Environment
