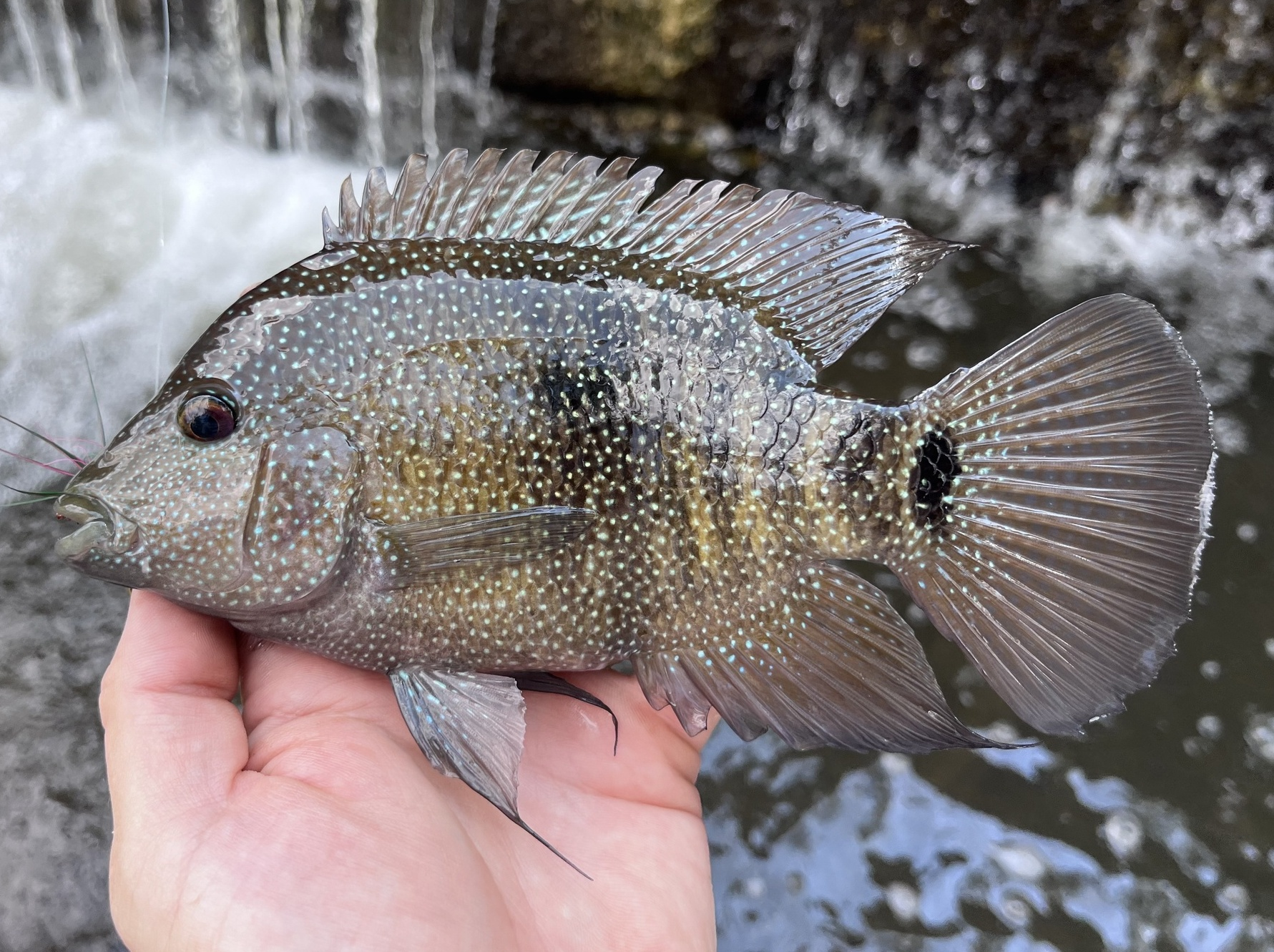
- In Texas
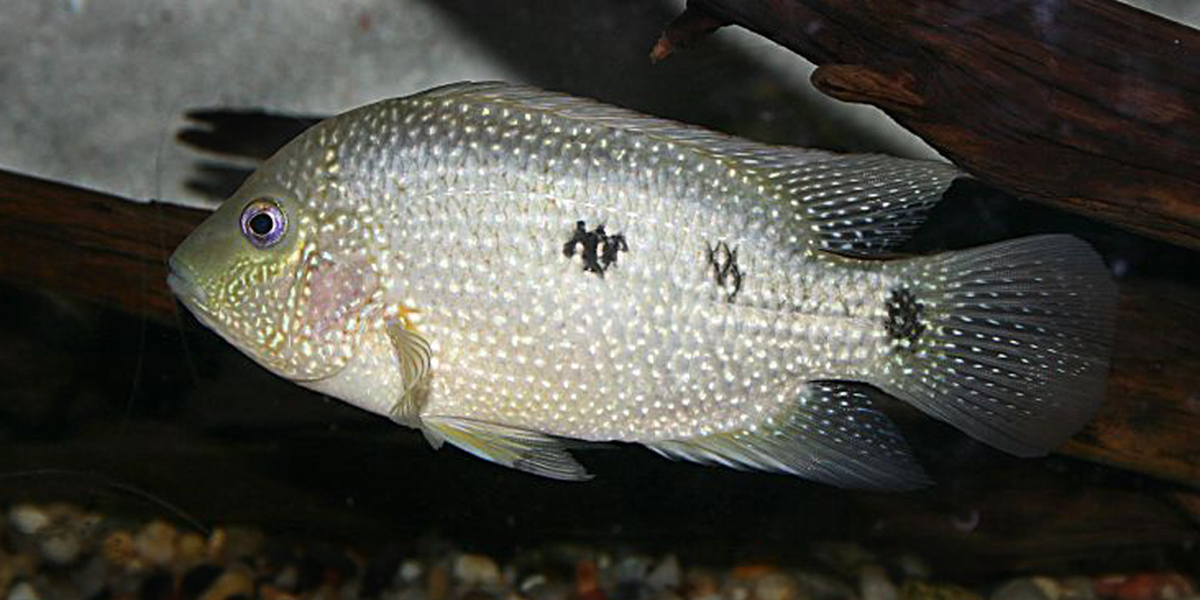

Conservation status
- Least Concern (IUCN 3.1)

- Secure (NatureServe)

Scientific classification
- Kingdom: Animalia
- Phylum: Chordata
- Class: Actinopterygii
- Division: Teleostei
- Order: Cichliformes
- Family: Cichlidae
- Genus: Herichthys
- Species: H. cyanoguttatus

Binomial name
- Herichthys cyanoguttatus (S. F. Baird & Girard, 1854)

Synonyms
- Cichlasoma cyanoguttatum (Baird & Girard, 1854); Herichthys cyanoguttatum Baird & Girard, 1854; Heros pavonaceus Garman, 1881; Cichlasoma pavonaceum (Garman, 1881); Parapetenia cyanostigma Hernandez-Rolon, 1990

= Texas cichlid =

Species of fish

The Texas cichlid (Herichthys cyanoguttatus), also known as the Rio Grande cichlid, is a freshwater fish of the cichlid family and the only cichlid species native to the United States. It is found in the lower Rio Grande drainage in Texas near Brownsville and northeastern Mexico, but some populations have been established in river drainages of Central Texas' Edwards Plateau, including the San Marcos, Guadalupe, San Antonio, and Colorado Rivers.

== Description ==
Herichthys cyanoguttatus can grow to be over 13 in (33 cm) and is differentiated by its distinctive characteristics and specific habitat needs. This cichlid is recognized by its cream and turquoise spots. Adult males also develop a nuchal hump on their heads. This cichlid also prefers the water temperature to be between 68 and 82 °F (20–28 °C) and are negatively affected by rapid changes in temperature.

== Taxonomy ==
The Texas cichlid was originally part of the genus Cichlasoma until that group was restricted to South American cichlids. The species has been transferred to the genus Herichthys, which is described as cichlids that

"share a color pattern of short vertical bars and black spots posteriorly from the middle of the side, and a unique breeding color pattern in which the dorsal half of the entire head and anterior flank region turns a pale grayish color in contrast to black or dark gray adjacent areas, or the entire body turns pale."

== Mating and parental habits ==
This cichlid is known for its complex reproductive behavior with a long parental care period. Its mating habits are tied to the monogamous nature of the fish. The competitive pairs always consist of a larger male and a smaller female. These pairs travel long distances between March and August to mate and aggressively defend their mating sites against other pairs of cichlids.

Prior to spawning, a site, generally consisting of rocks in water less than 30 cm deep, is chosen by both parents and cleaned by nipping the surface. No individual cichlid appears to maintain territory prior to mating. After a territory is selected and cleaned, the eggs are deposited.

Females release one to five eggs at a time; males then go to the eggs and excrete a seminal fluid onto the eggs. This process is repeated until around 2,000 eggs have been distributed. During the egg stage, both parents alternate in the parental tasks, though males spend more time patrolling territory and females spend more time actively attending to the offspring by fanning the eggs. At certain intervals, the female cichlid stops fanning the eggs and begins nipping at them. The eggs then hatch into wrigglers with yolk sacks, which are absorbed after one week and the wrigglers become free-swimming fry.

The fry form a small group that slowly moves around the territory with the parents stationed in the middle. Both parents defend this small territory against intruders. At all stages, the female violently chases the intruders more often and faster than the male parent. Typically, their roles are exchanged, but this becomes less frequent during the fry stage, as both parents tend to stay with the young.

== Diet ==
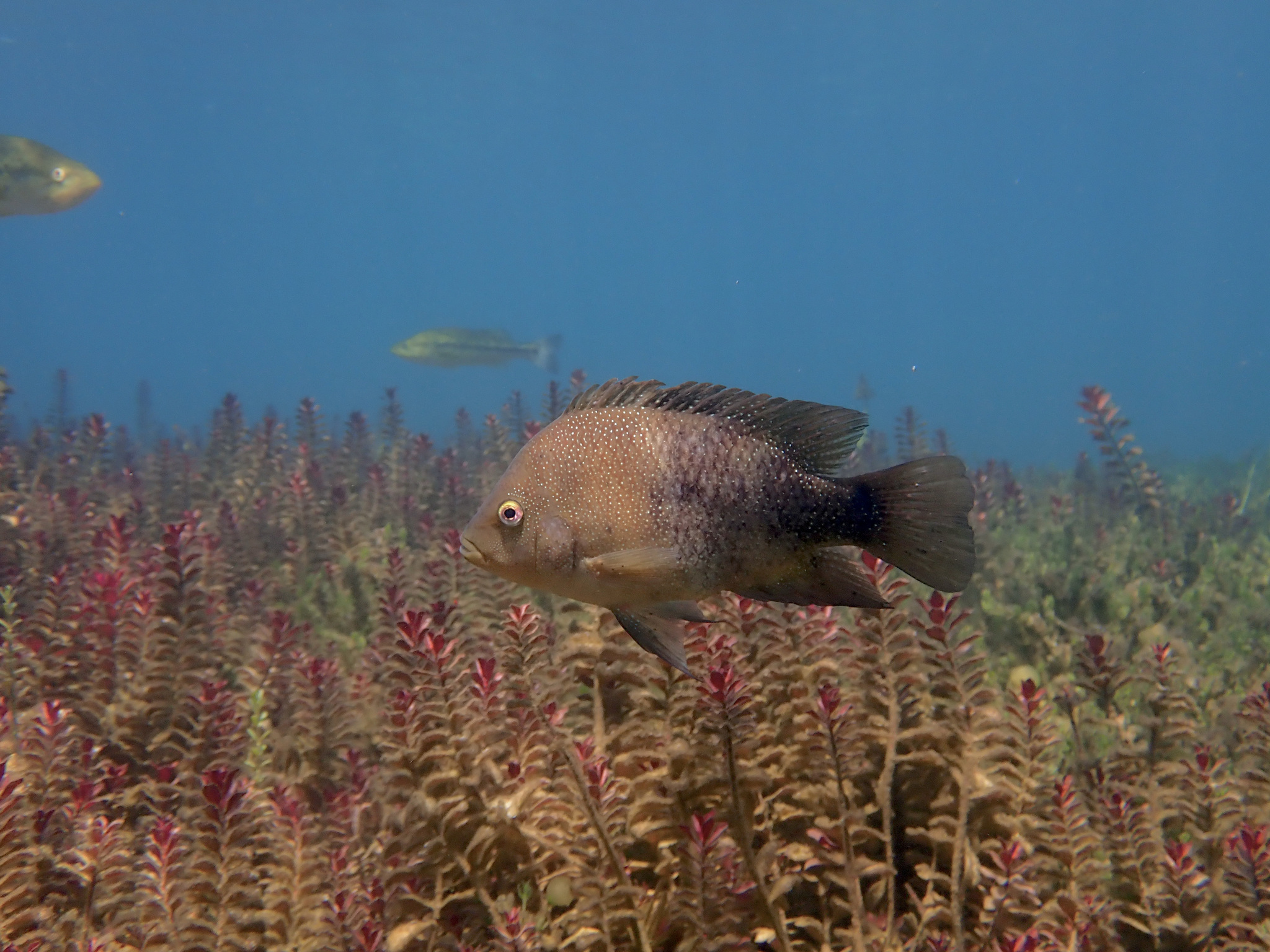
H. cyanoguttatus

The cichlid's omnivorous diet consists of vegetable matter or detritus, often feeding on plants, insects, and smaller fish, as well as fish eggs. The cichlid, in certain situations, can also be described as an "opportunistic carnivore", feeding on small vertebrates and invertebrates, including small frogs and water snakes. The cichlid is a "deliberate hunter", and it depends on the camouflage of its skin to sneak up on its prey.

== As an invasive fish ==
The Texas cichlid has several qualities that contribute to its success as an invasive species; it is not greatly affected by high-energy wave events, nor pollution from outfall canals. These cichlids also have very high tolerance for salt water and high salinities that would normally act as barriers to the entrance of invasive fish.

These cichlids can disrupt the food web with their flexible diet, which can shift depending on what fish are around them. They are aggressive whether they are holding territory or not, which can inhibit growth and reproduction of native species and the effects can be far-reaching. They also drive other fish into open areas, which lowers the population of the other species through incidental predation. The cichlid is a pioneer species that paves the way for other fish to invade, which has occurred in Six Mile Creek, Florida, and in the upper San Antonio River, Texas. The actual effects of the cichlid on the environment as yet are unknown.

=== Florida ===
In Florida, the success of the fish has been limited to artificial canals. How the fish first got into Florida is unknown, but the fish may have been introduced in Florida from Texas stocks in 1941 by a private individual. Other theories are that fish farms were flooded and the result was that this fish escaped.

=== Louisiana ===
In Louisiana, the fish has slowly taken over the waters of New Orleans. The fish has a high salinity tolerance (up to 8 ppt), but this likely is caused by the interbreeding of this fish and the related lowland cichlid (Herichthys carpintis), which makes it an ideal invader for the brackish conditions of southern Louisiana. This species is thought to have entered into the New Orleans area through multiple aquarium releases in central Jefferson Parish in 1989. Since it has a short mating cycle, the fish quickly made its way through the canal system and into Lake Pontchartrain. Pump stations and Lake Pontchartrain aided the spread of the fish into other canals.

H. cyanoguttatus has been present in natural and degraded habitats of the greater New Orleans metropolitan area for at least 20 years. The first time the cichlid was reported to have been caught in New Orleans was on 17 June 1996. In May 1998, 23 fish were caught in a Jefferson Parish canal. Between 2006 and 2007, the number of cichlids increased significantly in sites such as Pontchartrain Lagoon, Bayou Metairie, and Marconi Lagoon. The effect of the invasive fish in the area is as of now, uncertain, but many studies have been done to determine their effect on the ecosystem.

Some of these studies have shown that this cichlid has spread into Bayou St. John and City Park. The cichlid acts aggressively toward native largemouth bass, western mosquitofish, sailfin mollies, and blue crabs. This aggressiveness can occur in the form of tail beating and mouth wrestling. The fish also appears to cause reproductive failure of sheepshead minnows.

The Texas cichlid was largely unaffected by abiotic events such as Hurricanes Katrina and Rita because of its high tolerance for saltwater intake. In fact, these hurricanes actually helped the fish to take over the bayous of New Orleans.The park's flooding during Katrina helped the cichlid to spread.

In Bayou St. John, the cichlid threatens to overwhelm native species and ruin the efforts of the Louisiana Department of Wildlife and Fisheries to restore the historical fishery of the bayou. The fish competes with native fish for shallow mating sites, which reduces the chances of the diverse fishery ever being fully recovered.

The fish has already eliminated several smaller fish in this bayou, including killifish and sheepshead minnows. In fact, if the Louisiana Department of Wildlife and Fisheries did not routinely restock several midsized species, the cichlid likely would have eliminated these fish, too. Because of this, a competition at the City Park, the Big Bass Fishing Rodeo and Fishtival is held to catch the most cichlids, sunfish. and crappie. According to fisherman Joe Adams, who participates in the competition,

"They will eat just about anything ... I know one guy who catches them with French fries ... pieces of a hot dog and pieces of canned corn."

Despite these efforts, practically no chance exists for eradicating this fish from New Orleans' waters, mainly because of its short mating cycle.

== As a sportfish and foodfish ==
Texas cichlids have been deliberately and accidentally introduced into the wild throughout the subtropical southern United States from Texas to Florida (where water temperatures rarely dip below 48 °F (9 °C), where they have flourished and are often caught incidentally when fishing for sunfish and other panfish.

Most anglers outside South and Central Texas do not recognize the fish, so they are released, but these fish are considered invasives and should be destroyed if caught outside their natural range. They are regularly targeted in both South Texas, where they are known as "Rio Grande cichlid" and northern Mexico, where they are known as mojarra de norte. Lake Guerrero, Tamaulipas, is recognized for its excellent largemouth bass fishing (another often-invasive species); there, the locals consider the Texas cichlid to be the best-eating fish in the lake. Texas cichlids taste similar to commercially raised tilapia, an African cichlid species to which they are distantly related.

The fish is caught on light tackle with small hooks (#4 to #8) like those used for other panfish, with live crickets making excellent bait, but they strike a wide variety of baits. They fight similarly to bluegill sunfish, making tight circles and then darting off in a broadsided run. Average size of adult fish in the wild is 5–6 inches, and 1 pound, with 2 pounds not being uncommon.

== As an aquarium fish ==
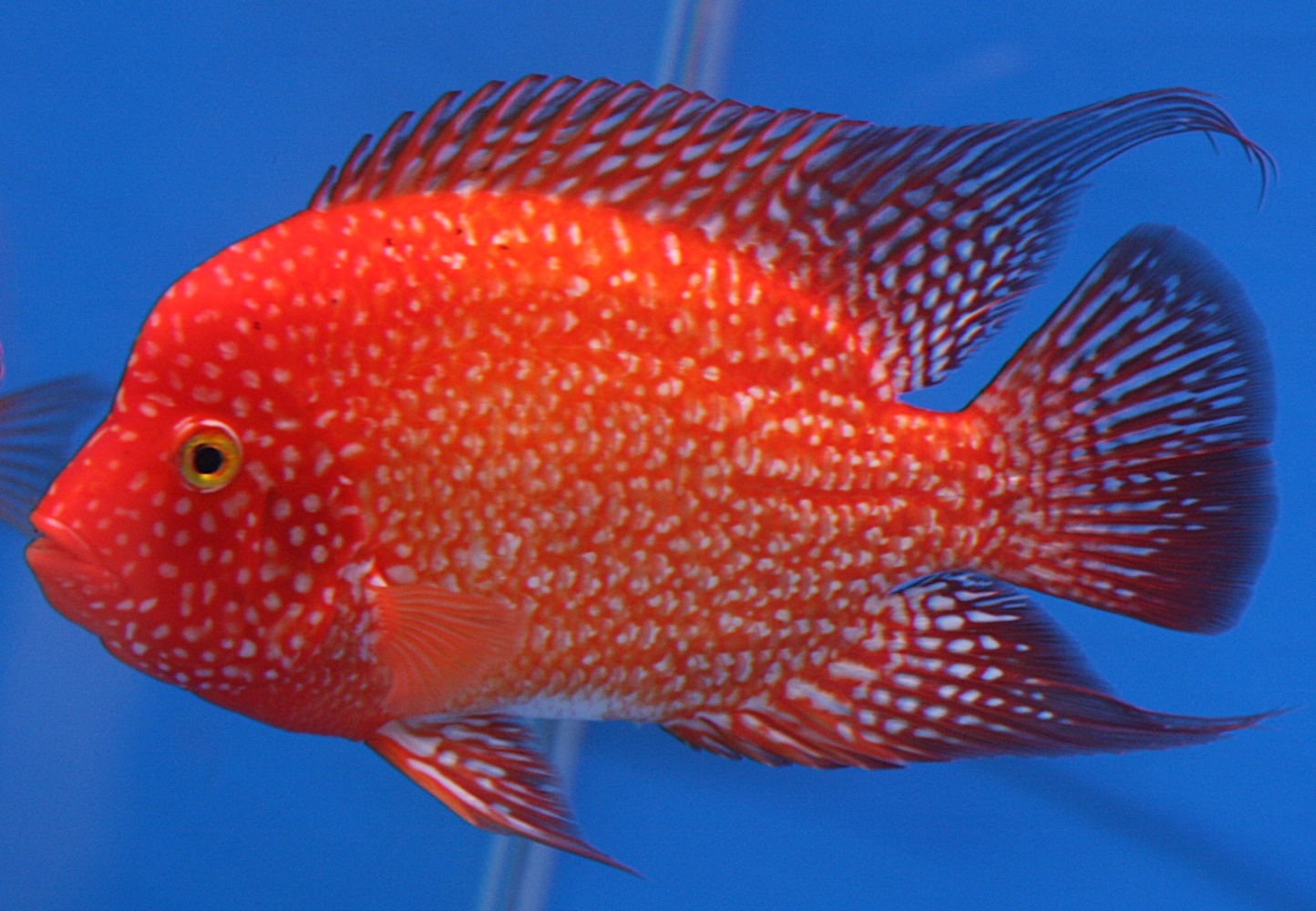
A hybrid fish called a "red Texas cichlid"

The Texas cichlid is commonly found in the aquarium trade and became relatively popular in the 1980s with cichlid enthusiasts because of its iridescent blue and green markings.

The "green Texas cichlid" commonly seen in pet stores is another species, Herichthys carpintis, whose range does not actually extend as far as Texas. The "red Texas cichlid" is not a genuine Texas cichlid but rather a common cross-genus hybrid of Herichthys and Amphilophus parents. The common names come from the physical similarity to Herichthys cyanoguttatus.

== See also ==
- List of freshwater aquarium fish species

== Other sources ==
- Goldstein, R.J. (2000). American Aquarium Fishes. College Station, TX: Texas A&M University Press. pp. 385–386. ISBN 0-89096-880-2.
- Froese, Rainer; Pauly, Daniel (eds.). "Herichthys cyanoguttatus". FishBase. October 2006 version.
