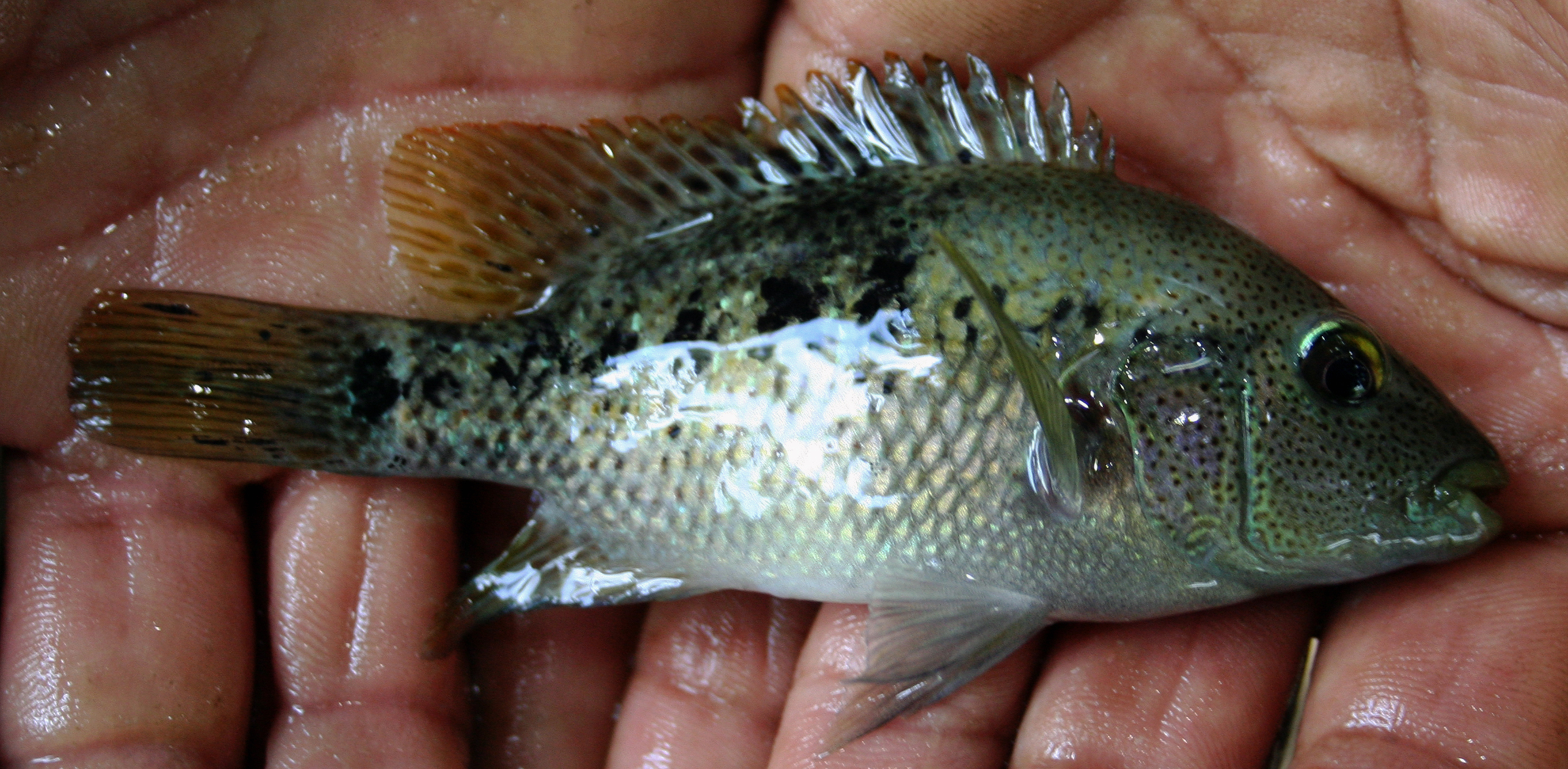
- Herichthys pame, formerly known as H. labridens 'white' is a species of cichlid endemic to the Tamasopo River, in the state of San Luis Potosí, Mexico

Scientific classification
- Kingdom: Animalia
- Phylum: Chordata
- Class: Actinopterygii
- Order: Cichliformes
- Family: Cichlidae
- Genus: Herichthys
- Species: H. pame

Binomial name
- Herichthys pame (De la Maza-Benignos & Lozano-Vilano, 2013)

Synonyms
- Nosferatu pame De la Maza-Benignos & Lozano-Vilano, 2013

= Herichthys pame =

Species of fish

Herichthys pame, previously placed in the genus Nosferatu, also known as H. labridens 'white' or mojarra caracolera blanca in Spanish, is a species of cichlid "endemic to the main stem and tributaries of the Rio Gallinas, including Rio Tamasopo, Ojo Frío, and Agua Buena, upriver from the Tamul cascade" in the Pánuco River Basin, San Luis Potosí, Mexico.

"This species is distinguished by its predorsal contour being gradual and acute, not concave before eye; dorsal and ventral contours straight to moderately convex, sloping slowly; intersection with caudal peduncle inconspicuous; mouth slightly angled downward. Ground color khaki when alive; snout, head, and opercles heavily dotted with tiny speckles, extending posteriorly onto nuchal area and base of dorsal fin. Eye diameter small (mean 23%, SD 1%), snout long (mean 39%, SD 2%), and cheeks shallow (mean 29%, SD 2%) (all in HL). Lower pharyngeal plate stout and much broader than long; horns short with lightly pigmented stout molars, 2 central rows of 6–7 molars flank the midline, posterior-most 3 big and stout. The peritoneum uniformly very dark." It is found sympatric with Herichthys tamasopoensis and H. steindachneri
