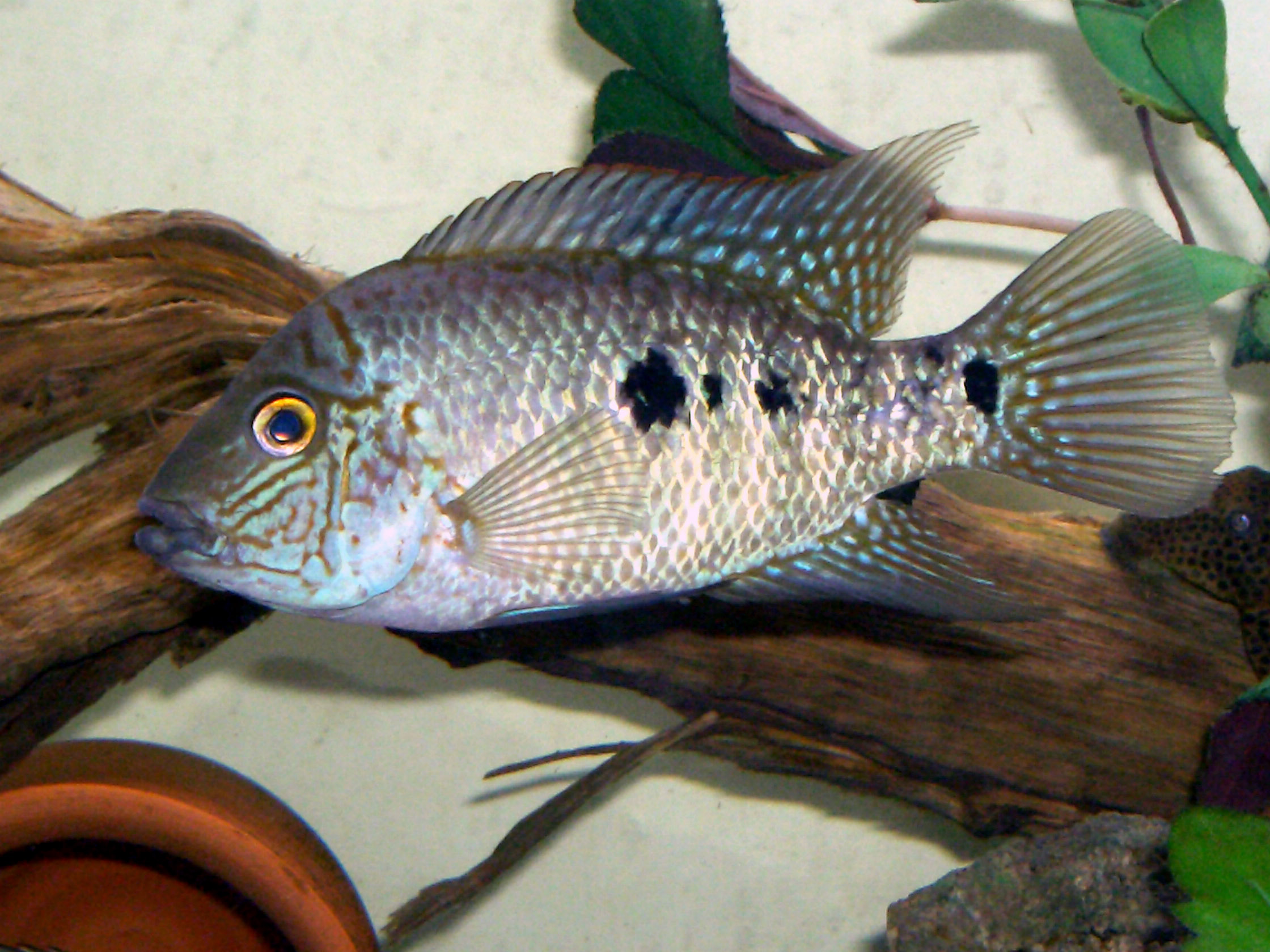
- Male H. tepehua from the Pantepec River Basin, Puebla, Mexico, in aquarium

Scientific classification
- Kingdom: Animalia
- Phylum: Chordata
- Class: Actinopterygii
- Order: Cichliformes
- Family: Cichlidae
- Genus: Herichthys
- Species: H. tepehua

Binomial name
- Herichthys tepehua De la Maza-Benignos, Ornelas-García, Lozano-Vilano, García-Ramírez & Doadrio, 2015

= Herichthys tepehua =

Species of fish

Herichthys tepehua is a species of cichlid endemic to Mexico where it occurs in the Pantepec, Cazones, Tenixtepec, Tecolutla and Solteros River drainages in the states of Veracruz and Puebla. The specific name alludes to the Tepehua ethnic group and language, these people live in eastern México, in the states of Veracruz and Puebla, in the region where this cichlid is found.

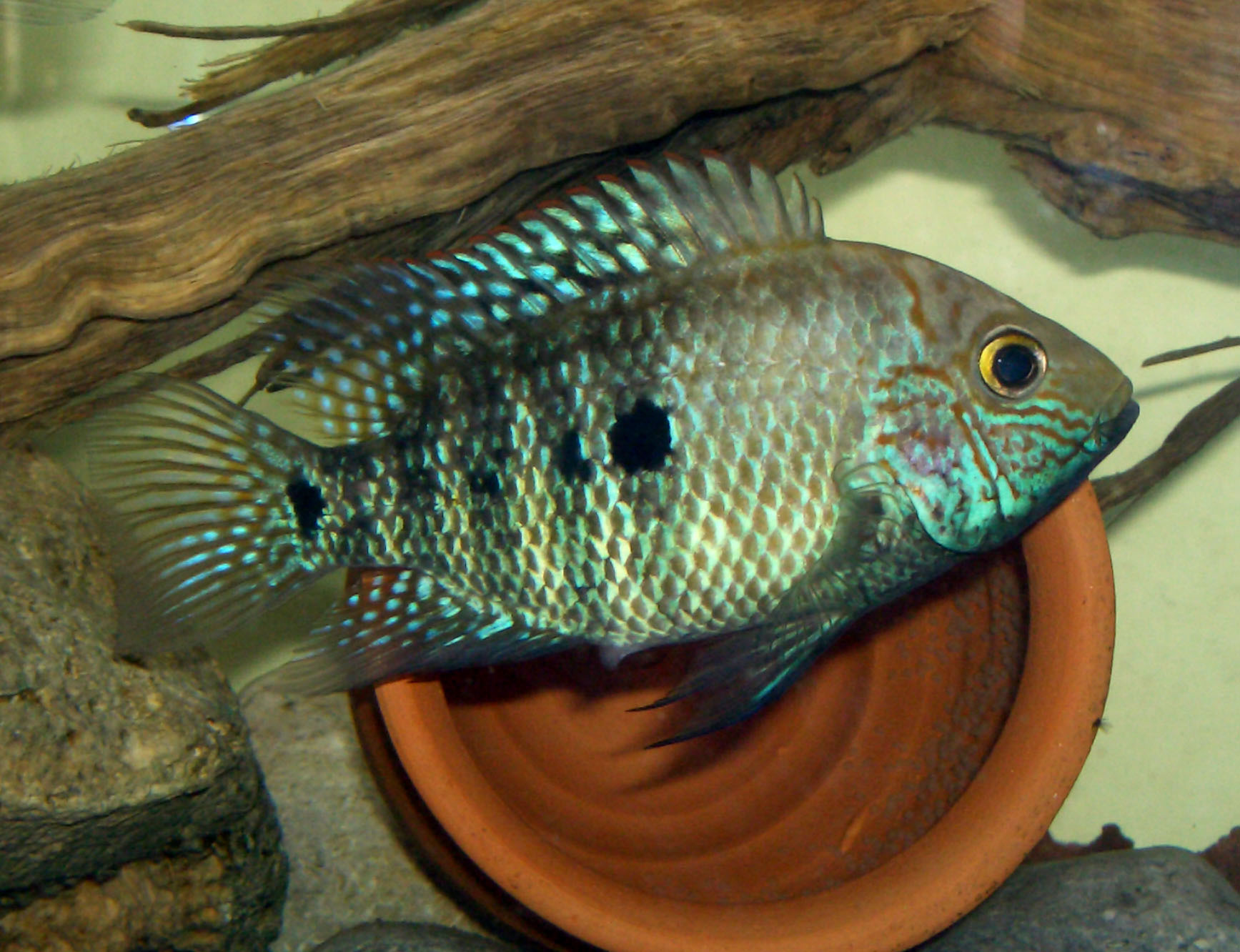
Female Herichthys tepehua from the Pantepec River Basin, Puebla, Mexico showing breeding colors in the aquarium

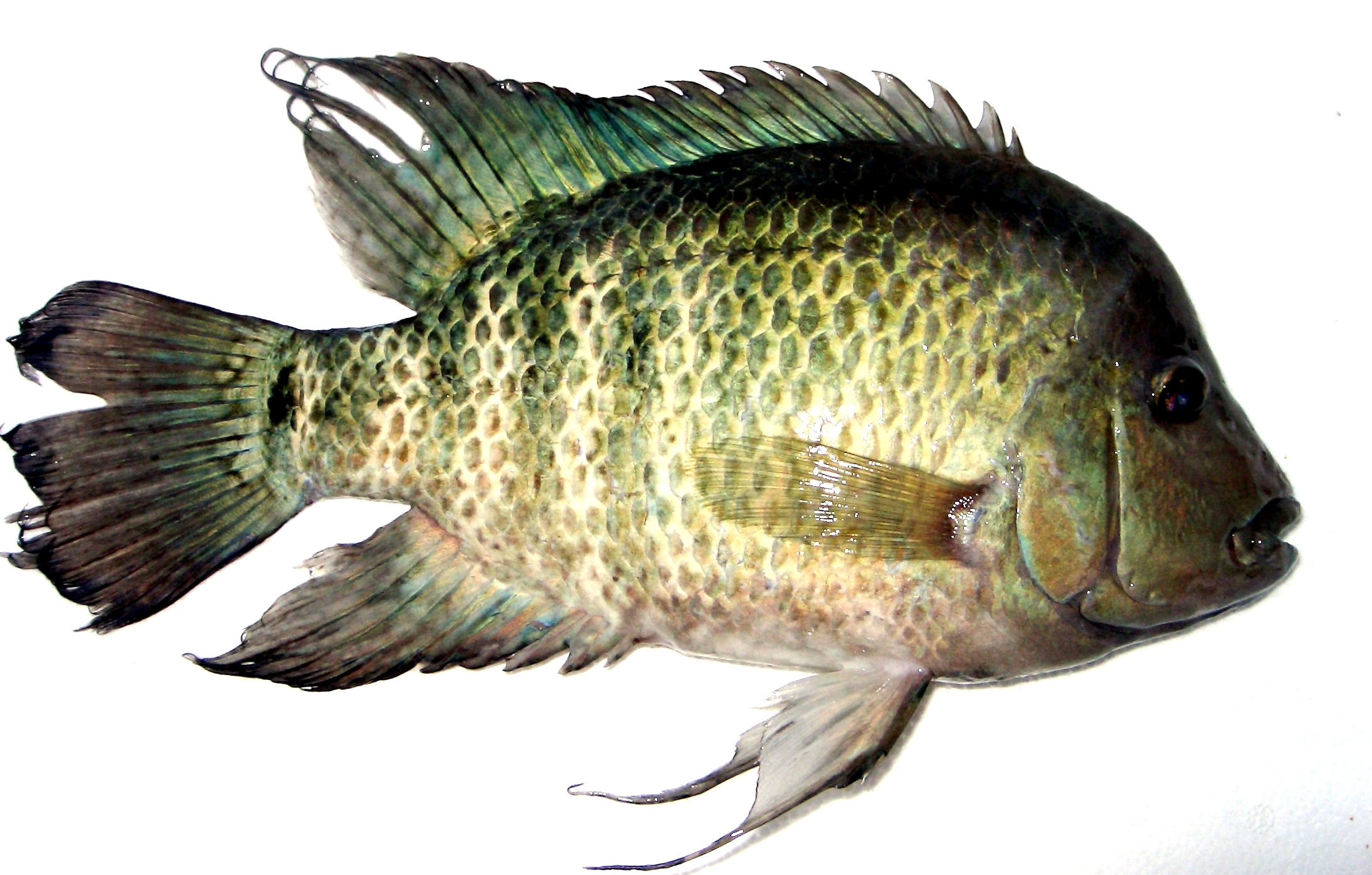
Herichthys tepehua from the Cazones River, Puebla, Mexico

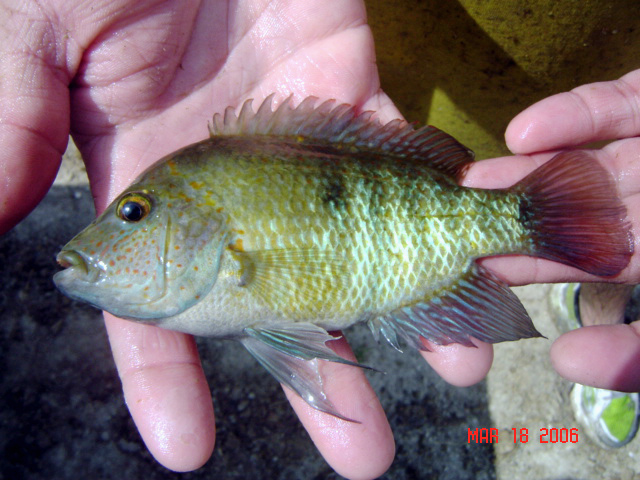
Freshly collected Herichthys tepehua from the Tenixtepec River in Veracruz, Mexico

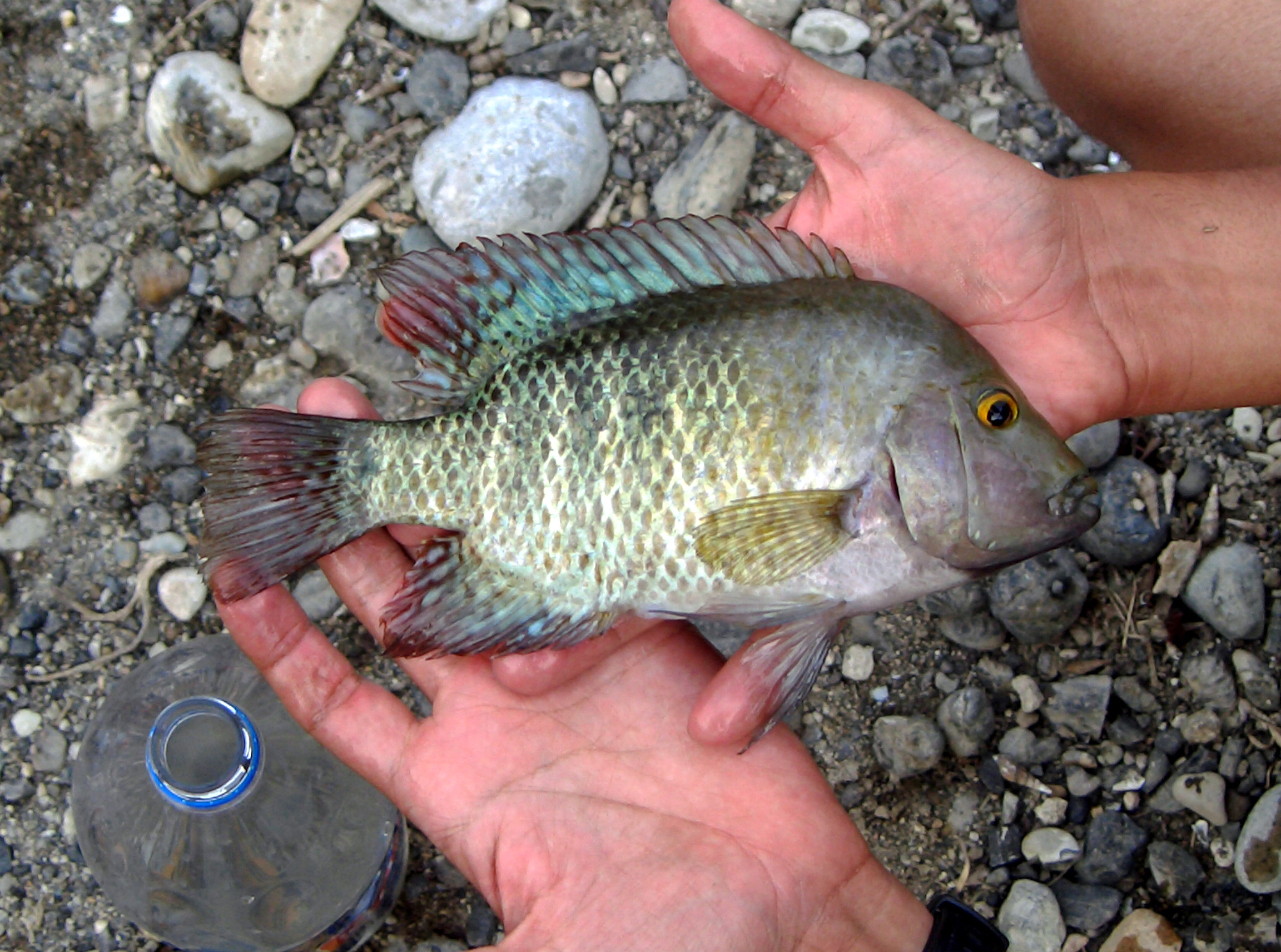
Freshly collected Herichthys tepehua from the Tecolutla River Basin

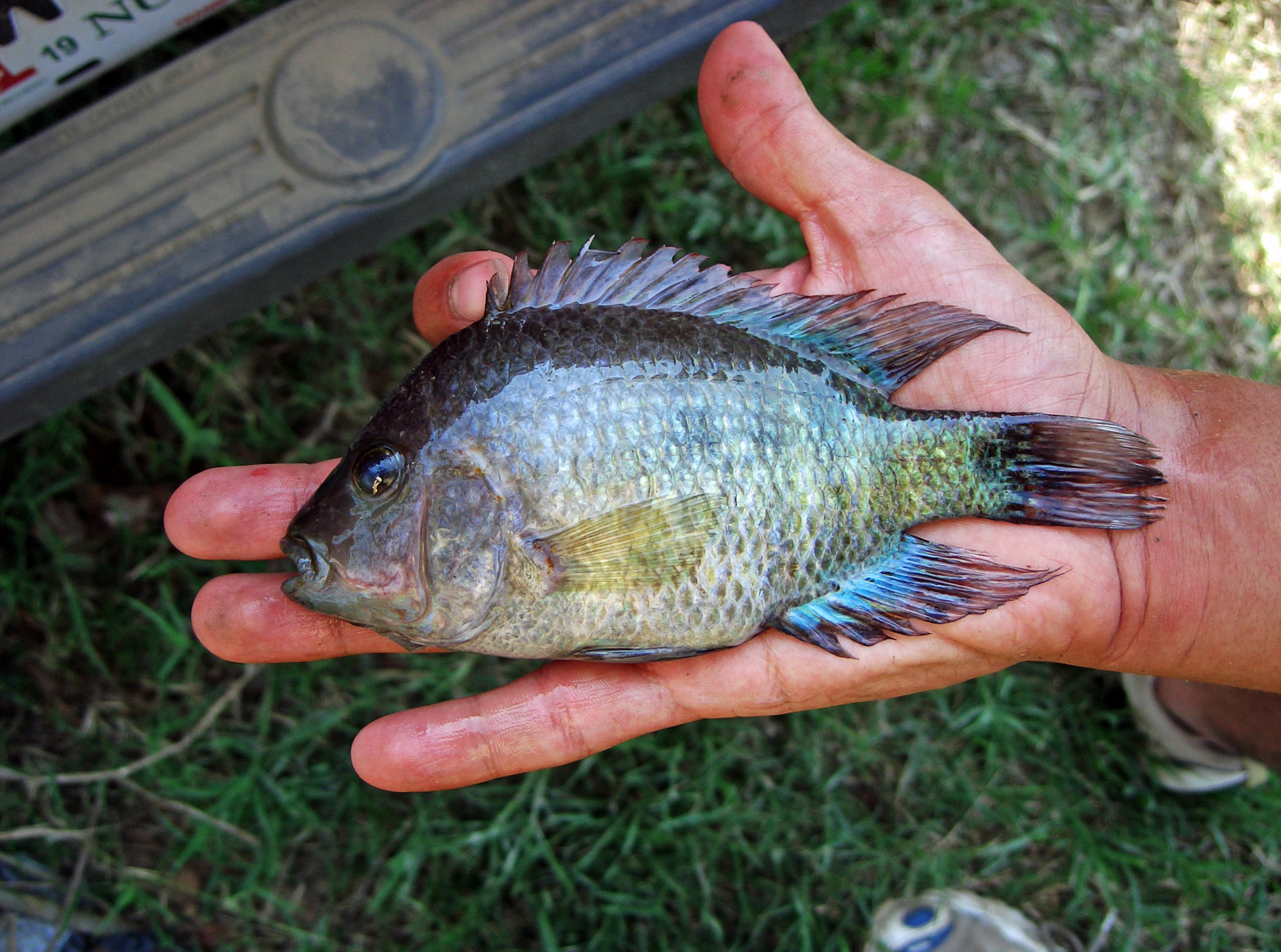
Herichthys tepehua collected in the Solteros River
