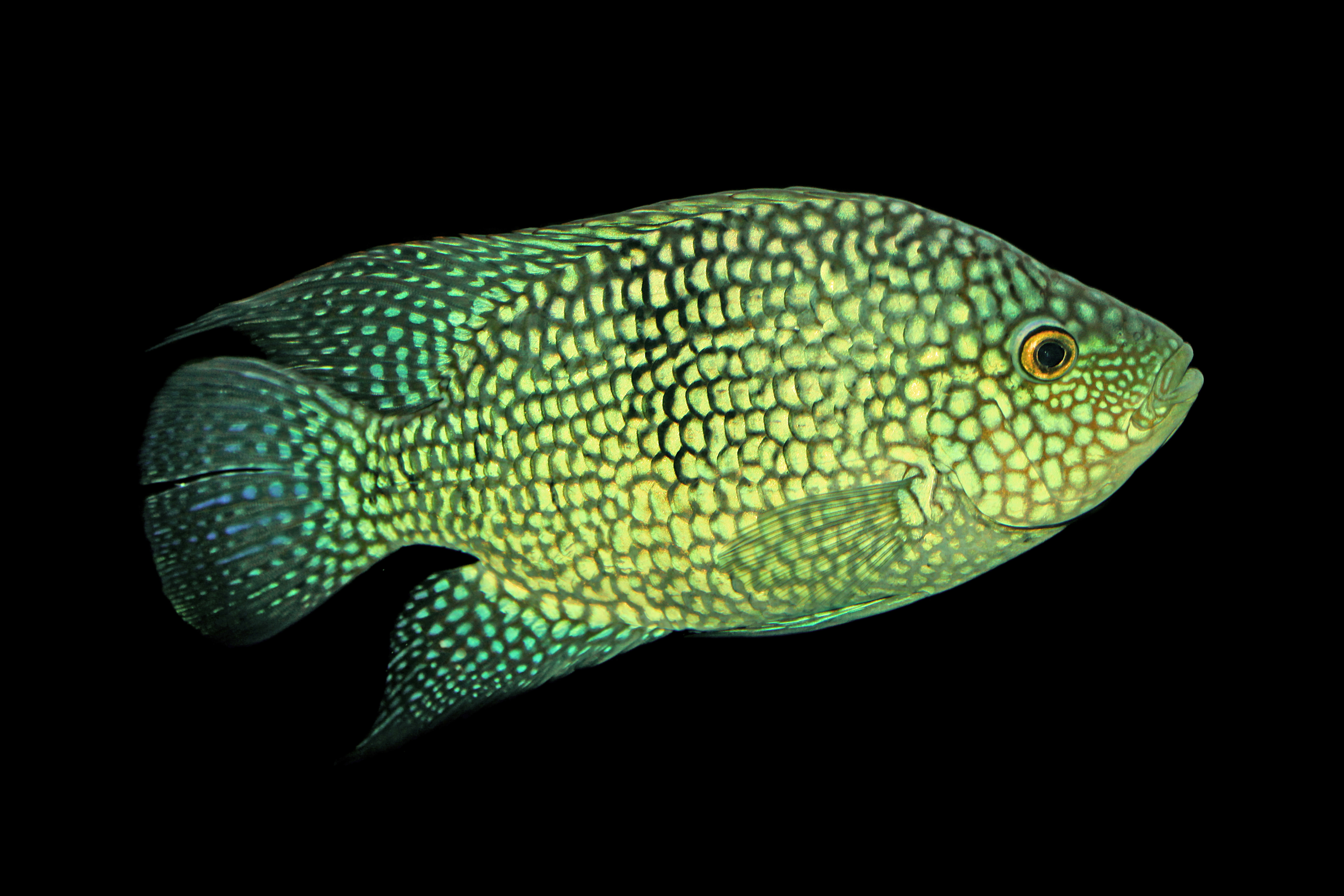

Conservation status
- Least Concern (IUCN 3.1)

Scientific classification
- Kingdom: Animalia
- Phylum: Chordata
- Class: Actinopterygii
- Division: Teleostei
- Order: Cichliformes
- Family: Cichlidae
- Genus: Herichthys
- Species: H. carpintis

Binomial name
- Herichthys carpintis (D. S. Jordan & Snyder, 1899)

Synonyms
- Cichlasoma carpinte (Jordan & Snyder, 1899); Cichlasoma carpintis (Jordan & Snyder, 1899); Cichlasoma laurae Regan, 1908; Cichlosoma atromaculatum laurae Regan, 1908; Cichlosoma laurae Regan, 1908; Neetroplus carpintis Jordan & Snyder, 1899

= Herichthys carpintis =

Species of fish

Herichthys carpintis, the lowland cichlid, pearlscale cichlid, is a species of cichlid. It is found in North America with both native and invasive populations. It is considered a Neotropical cichlid. The species H. carpintis was first described by Jordan & Snyder in 1899, though at the time of publication the species was described as Neetroplus carpintis.

== Taxonomy ==
Herichthys is a widely recognized genus monophyletic clade, and it is the only cichlid clade north of the Mexican Plateau. The diversification of the genus Herichthys is estimated to have begun approximately 6 million years ago.

Recent molecular research indicates that Herichthys is split into two major species groups: the Herichthys labridens group, including H. labridens, H. bartoni, H. pame, H. steindachneri and H. pantostictus, and the Herichthys cyanoguttatus group, including H. cyanoguttatus, H. carpintis, H. deppii, H. tepehua, H. minckleyi and H. tamasopoen-sis. The H. cyanoguttatus species group, which H. carpintis belongs to, underwent almost entirely allopatric speciation, meaning the species formed due to geographic isolation.

== Description ==
=== Appearance ===
The lowland cichlid's defining feature is its large, iridescent, pearl-like spots that cover its body. It has an olive-green base color while its spots are Persian-green. When breeding, their colors change to white on their anterior body and black bars or solid black on the posterior body. This color change can be more dramatic in females.

H. carpintis usually exhibits a rounded ventral profile (from the mouth to the caudal peduncle) and an oblique mouth with a slightly projecting lower jaw. Adult males also have a nuchal hump. It reaches a maximum size of 17 centimetres (6.7 in) SL. It is popular in the aquarium trade.

=== Diet and feeding ===
The lowland cichlid is an omnivore, and may eat detritus, arthropods, fishes, vascular plants, and snails. Some describe it as a detritivore, though populations from different regions have been shown to have diverse diets through their gut contents.

One study found that the main bacterial class in their gut is Gammaproteobacteria, which is influenced by the species of fish, the type of diet they have, the habitat they live in, diseases, and gut anatomy. Gut microbiota promotes fish health and growth. Interestingly, among the species in the genus Herichthys, H.carpintis showed high alpha diversity in its gut microbiota. This high diversity is often associated with the detritivorous nature of the species, potentially reflecting the occurrence of transitory microbes linked to its feeding habits.

Cichlids have a specialized feeding apparatus with many discrete, interconnected parts. This allows their oral and pharyngeal jaws, used for prey capture and prey processing, respectively, to function and evolve mostly independently. In Neotropical cichlids, like the lowland cichlid, the lower pharyngeal jaw is stout and broad. Due to its diet, the lowland cichlid likely uses low-kinesis feeding movements, which means there is less motion when they bite.

The teeth of H. carpintis are spatulate, chisel-like, bicuspid or weakly bicuspid, and may be a mixture of bicuspid and bluntly pointed conical shapes. They are usually similar in length across the upper and lower jaws, and, notably, the lower pharyngeal tooth plate is moderately stout and broad.

== Distribution and life history ==
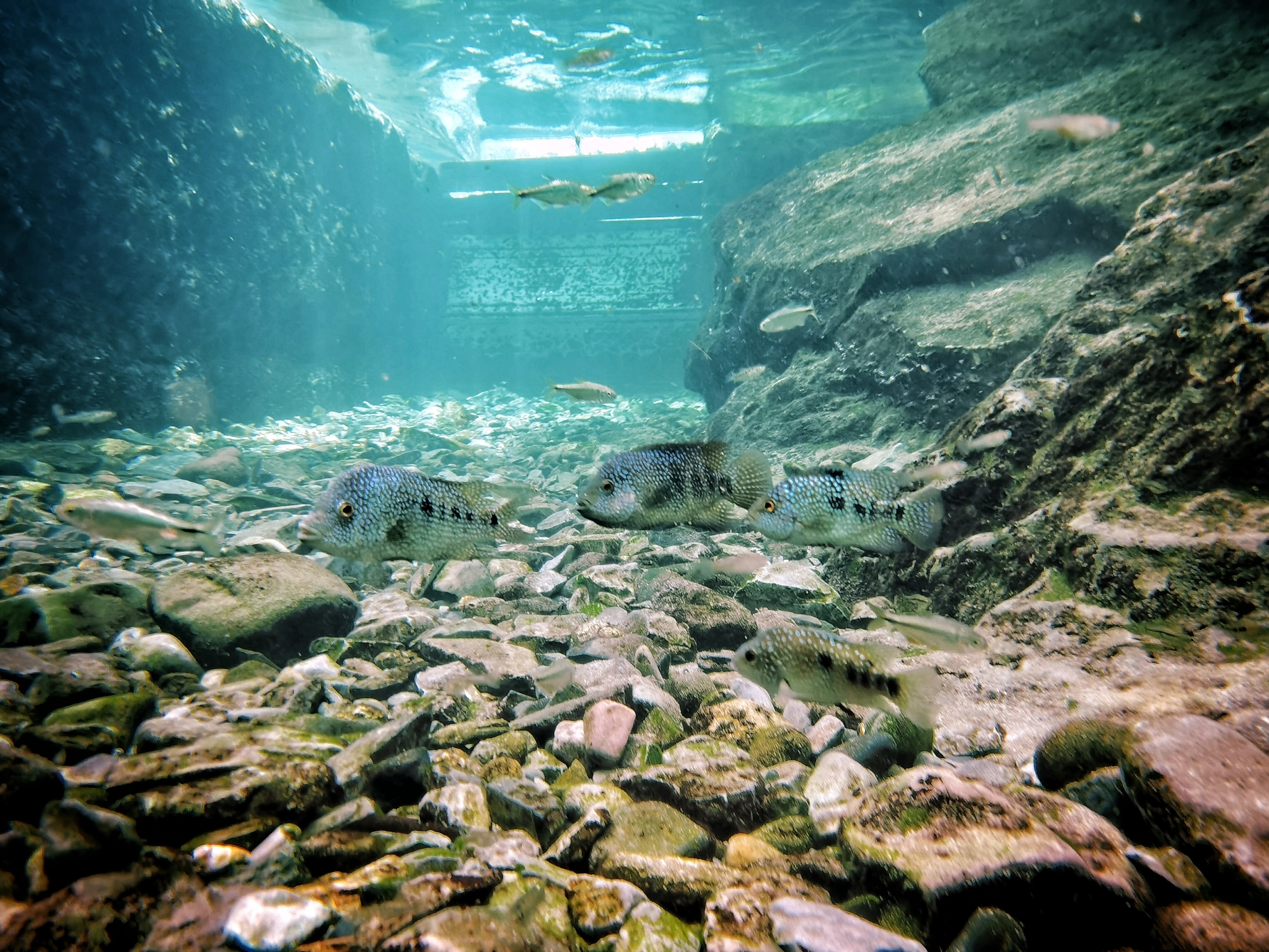
H. carpintis in habitat

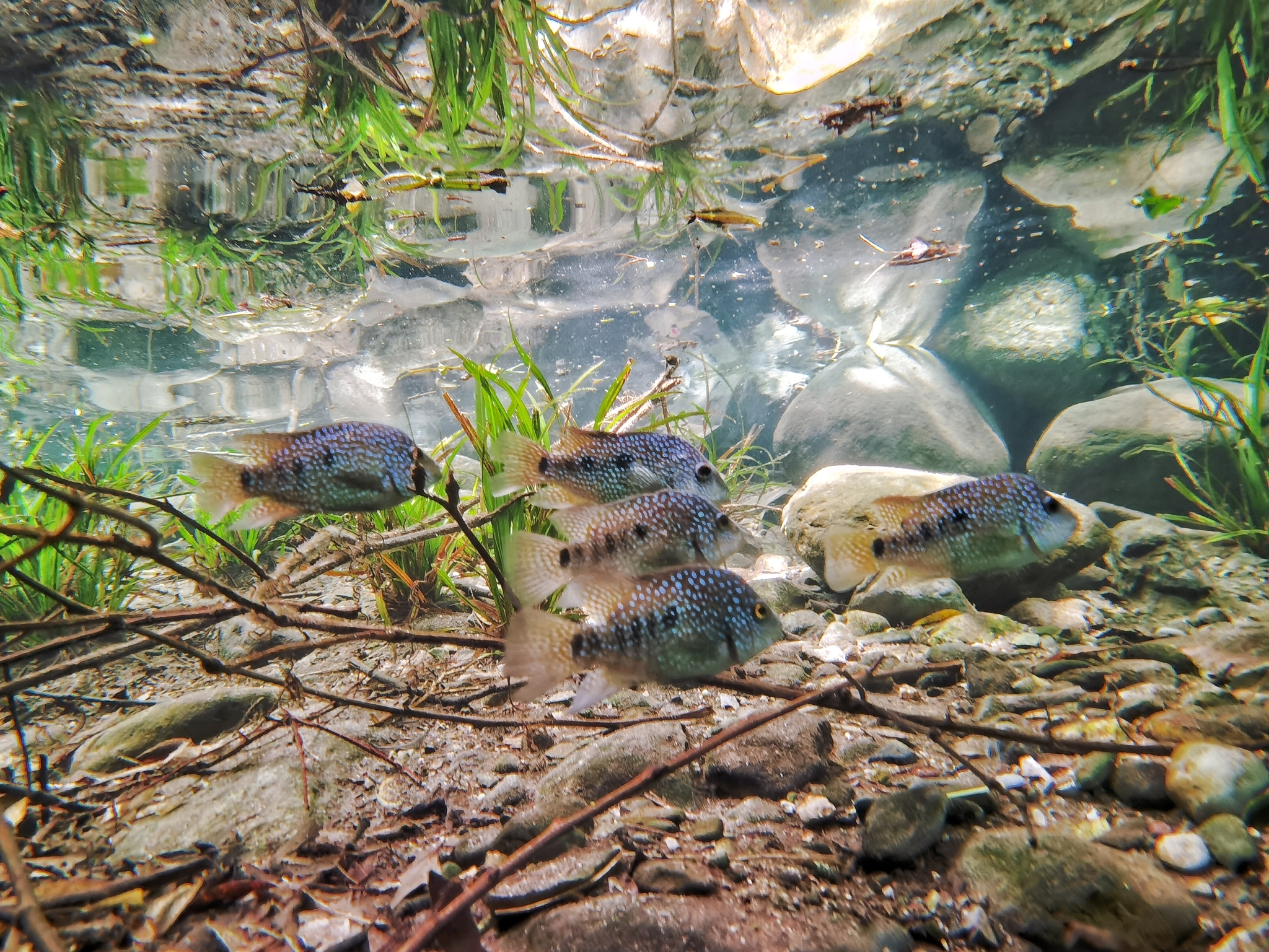
H. carpintis in habitat

H. carpintis is a widely distributed species. They likely arose and developed in lakes and rivers of coastal regions and experienced a population expansion during the Pleistocene. It is endemic to eastern Mexico where it occurs in the Pánuco River drainage, and the Soto La Marina River in northeastern Mexico. Its type locality is the Laguna del Carpinte, near Tampico in Tamaulipas, which is alluded to in the specific name. Now, the lowland cichlid has established populations in Louisiana, where it is considered an invasive species.

Life history traits like parental care, maturation, spawning, generation time, and behavior are associated with invasive potential. Successfully invasive species are known for their high fecundity, short generations, and opportunism. They have small eggs that rapidly develop and mature early. Cichlids are known for their good parental care and investing in relatively few offspring. They are territorial and have plasticity, or flexibility, in their maturation and feeding.

The lowland cichlid is euryhaline, meaning it has a high tolerance for salinity. They occur in coastal areas where salinity can sometimes reach as high as 17 parts per thousand, about half the average salinity of the ocean. H. carpintis may be able to use brackish waters in coastal areas to expand its range, and it is suggested that they originally colonized from the coastline toward inland areas. Researchers predict they will continue their expansion along the Gulf Coast while also expanding inland to freshwater sites.

== Cultural and economic value ==
Due to their diverse shapes, colors, and behaviors, cichlids are popular and valuable in the aquarium trade.

== Conservation status and invasiveness ==
H. carpintis is listed as Least Concern by the IUCN. However, the lowland cichlid faces environmental stressors in the Zimapan dam, a highly-invaded and contaminated location which they are native to. It is one of the most polluted river basins in Mexico, and specifically a reservoir for antibiotic-resistant bacteria and arsenic resistance.

The lowland cichlid is a successful fish that is an invasive species in the United States. Cichlids' popularity in the aquarium trade, however, has led them to be released by individuals, states, and private companies for a variety of reasons, including unwanted pets, farm escapes, or for aquatic plant control. Invasive populations of H. carpintis in Louisiana may have started from unwanted pets being dumped into the water.Therefore, they may have undergone artificial selection, founder effect, hybridization, and/or inbreeding before their release in Louisiana, affecting the population's genetic diversity.

In Louisiana, populations are often confused for Herichthys cyanoguttatus, or the Texas cichlid. The Texas cichlid is the only cichlid native to the United States, but in Louisiana, both cichlids are invasive to the region, and non-native populations resemble both species. While they look very similar, there are several ways to tell them apart. The Texas cichlid has small, iridescent spots covering its body while the lowland cichlid's spots are much larger. When breeding, both exhibit black and white colorations, but the dark pigmentation on H. carpintis extends farther anteriorly, reaching the tip of the mouth (see photo). On average, the lowland cichlid's head is longer and there is a greater distance from the rostral tip to the pectoral fin. H. carpintis has also been observed to have a shorter snout and larger eyes.

At least some of the cichlids established in Louisiana are H. carpintis and not H. cyanoguttatus. Studies about the invasive consequences of the Texas cichlid may have sampled populations of the lowland cichlid, believing they were Texas cichlids.
