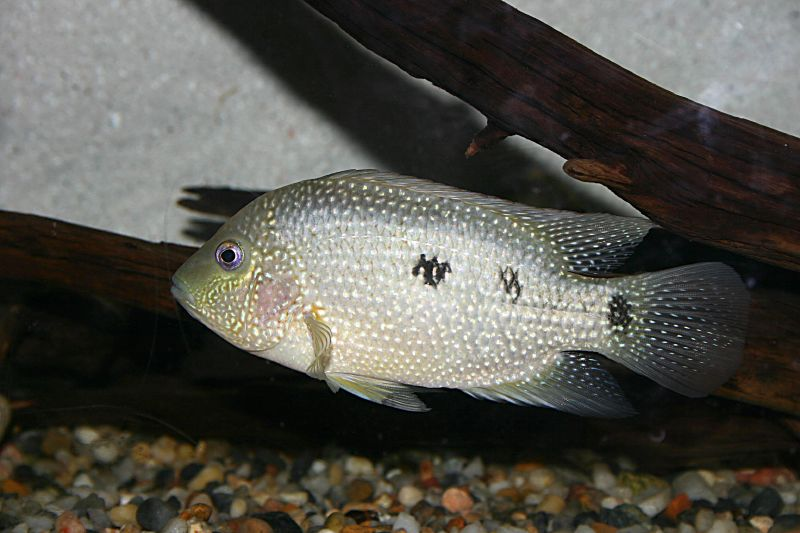
- Herichthys cyanoguttatus

Scientific classification
- Kingdom: Animalia
- Phylum: Chordata
- Class: Actinopterygii
- Division: Teleostei
- Order: Cichliformes
- Family: Cichlidae
- Tribe: Heroini
- Genus: Herichthys; S. F. Baird & Girard, 1854

Type species
- Herichthys cyanoguttatus S. F. Baird & Girard, 1854

Synonyms
- Nosferatu (De la Maza-Benignos et al., 2015)

= Herichthys =

Genus of fishes

Herichthys is a genus of cichlid fishes native to North and Central America. Most are endemic to Mexico, but H. cyanoguttatus is also found in southern Texas (United States) and has been introduced to central Texas and Florida.

In 2015, the genus was split in two, and seven species (H. bartoni, H. labridens, H. molango, H. pame, H. pantostictus, H. pratinus, and H. steindachneri) were moved into a new genus, Nosferatu. The validity of the move and newly erected genus was widely disputed by other ichthyologists in the field; consequently, the split was undone, and Nosferatu is no longer recognized as a valid genus by FishBase and Eschmeyer's Catalog of Fishes.

== Species ==
As of 2024, 14 species are recognized as valid by FishBase:

- Herichthys bartoni (T. H. Bean, 1892) (Barton's cichlid)
- Herichthys carpintis (D. S. Jordan & Snyder, 1899) (pearlscale cichlid, lowland cichlid)
- Herichthys cyanoguttatus S. F. Baird & Girard, 1854 (Texas cichlid, Rio Grande cichlid)
- Herichthys deppii (Heckel, 1840) (Nautla cichlid)
- Herichthys labridens (Pellegrin, 1903) (curve-bar cichlid)
- Herichthys minckleyi (Kornfield & J. N. Taylor, 1983) (Minkley's cichlid)
- Herichthys pame De la Maza-Benignos & Lozano-Vilano, 2013
- Herichthys pantostictus (J. N. Taylor & R. R. Miller, 1983) (Chairel cichlid)
- Herichthys steindachneri (D. S. Jordan & Snyder, 1899) (Steindachner's cichlid)
- Herichthys tamasopoensis Artigas Azas, 1993 (Tamasopo cichlid)
- Herichthys tepehua De la Maza-Benignos et al., 2015

=== Species of disputed validity ===
Eschmeyer's Catalog of Fishes only recognizes 11 species in Herichthys as valid, and considers the following species to be synonymous with other Herichthys species:

- H. molango (De la Maza-Benignos & Lozano-Vilano, 2013) — synonym of H. pantostictus
- Herichthys pratinus (De la Maza-Benignos & Lozano-Vilano, 2013) — synonym of H. pantostictus
- Herichthys teporatus (Fowler, 1903) — synonym of Herichthys carpintis
