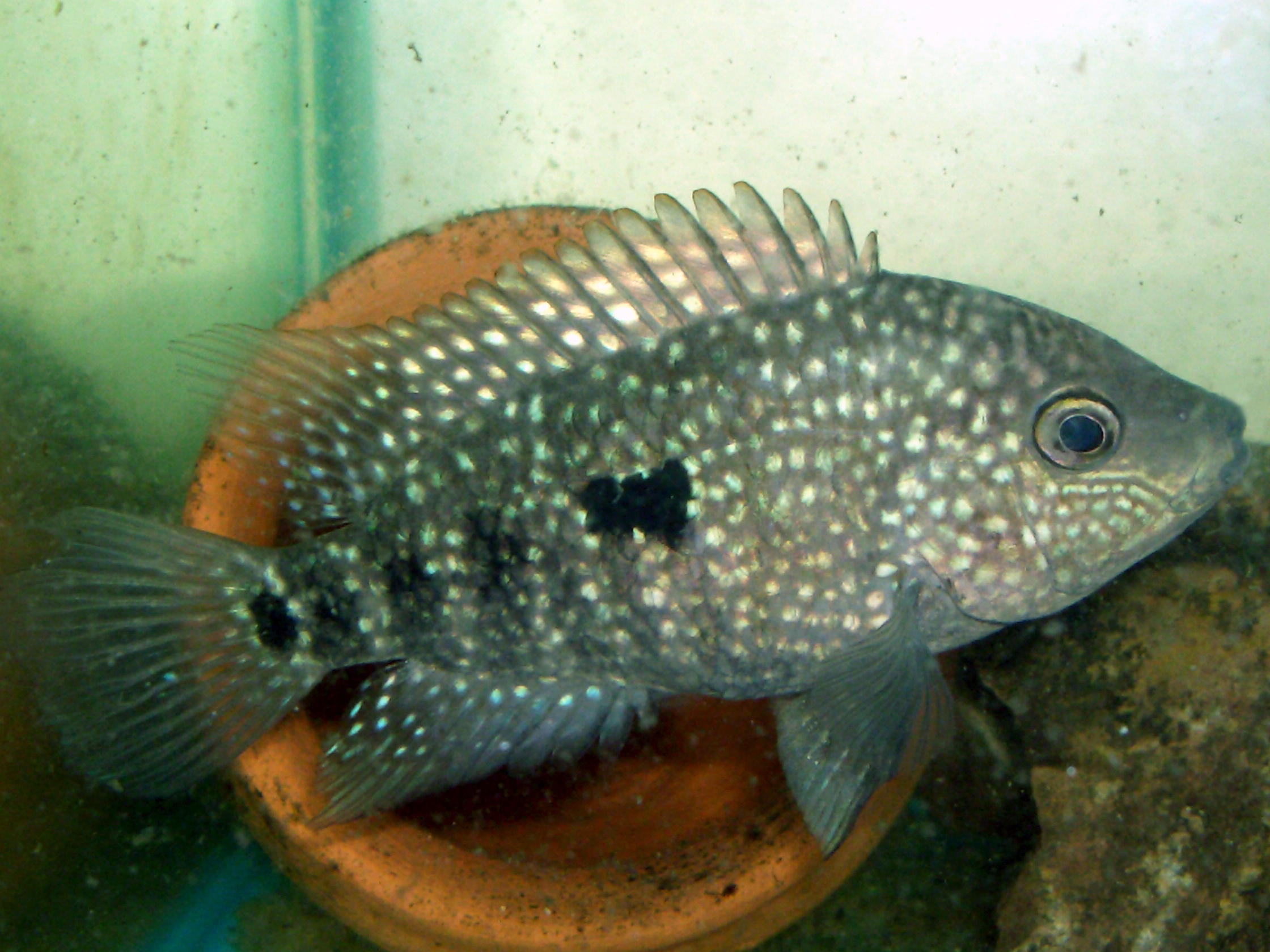
- Herichthys teporatus from the Soto La Marina River Basin, in aquarium

Scientific classification
- Kingdom: Animalia
- Phylum: Chordata
- Class: Actinopterygii
- Order: Cichliformes
- Family: Cichlidae
- Genus: Herichthys
- Species: H. teporatus

Binomial name
- Herichthys teporatus (Fowler, 1903)

Synonyms
- Heros teporatus Fowler, 1903

= Herichthys teporatus =

Species of fish

Herichthys teporatus, also known as the Soto la Marina cichlid, is a species of cichlid fish endemic to Mexico, where it occurs in the Soto La Marina River drainage in the state of Tamaulipas.
