= Herichthys deppii =

Conservation status
- Least Concern (IUCN 3.1)

Scientific classification
- Kingdom: Animalia
- Phylum: Chordata
- Class: Actinopterygii
- Order: Cichliformes
- Family: Cichlidae
- Genus: Herichthys
- Species: H. deppii

Binomial name
- Herichthys deppii (J. J. Heckel, 1840)

Synonyms
- Heros deppii Heckel, 1840; Cichlasoma deppii (Heckel, 1840); Heros montezuma Heckel, 1840

Species of fish

Herichthys deppii, also known as the Nautla cichlid, is a species of cichlid native to the Nautla and Misantla rivers of Mexico. It reaches a maximum size of 12 centimetres (4.7 in) TL. The specific name honours the German naturalist, explorer and painter, Ferdinand Deppe, (1794-1861) who collected the type specimen.
