= Herichthys labridens =

Conservation status
- Endangered (IUCN 3.1)

Scientific classification
- Kingdom: Animalia
- Phylum: Chordata
- Class: Actinopterygii
- Order: Cichliformes
- Family: Cichlidae
- Genus: Herichthys
- Species: H. labridens

Binomial name
- Herichthys labridens (Pellegrin, 1903)

Synonyms
- Heros labridens Pellegrin, 1903; Cichlasoma labridens (Pellegrin, 1903); Nosferatu labridens (Pellegrin, 1903)

Species of fish

Herichthys labridens, the curve-bar cichlid, is a species of cichlid freshwater fish endemic to the Laguna Media Luna and headwaters of the Río Verde between 1,000–1,100 m (3,280–3,610 ft) above sea level in the state of San Luis Potosí, Mexico. Its range is a part of the upper Panuco River basin. It shares its distribution with the related Herichthys bartoni. Herichthys labridens can reach a maximum total length of 25 cm (10 in). It is endangered due to habitat loss, pollution and introduced species.
