= Herichthys tamasopoensis =

Scientific classification
- Domain: Eukaryota
- Kingdom: Animalia
- Phylum: Chordata
- Class: Actinopterygii
- Order: Cichliformes
- Family: Cichlidae
- Genus: Herichthys
- Species: H. tamasopoensis

Binomial name
- Herichthys tamasopoensis Artigas Azas, 1993

Synonyms
- Cichlasoma tamasopoensis (Artigas Azas, 1993)

Species of fish

Herichthys tamasopoensis, also known as the Tamasopo cichlid, is a species of cichlid endemic to the Tamasopo River of the Panuco River in San Luis Potosí state of central-eastern Mexico. The Tamasopo is a tributary of the Panuco River.

It reaches a maximum size of 18.0 centimetres (7.1 in) TL.
