= Soto La Marina River =

Coordinates: 23.7601°N 98.2053°W

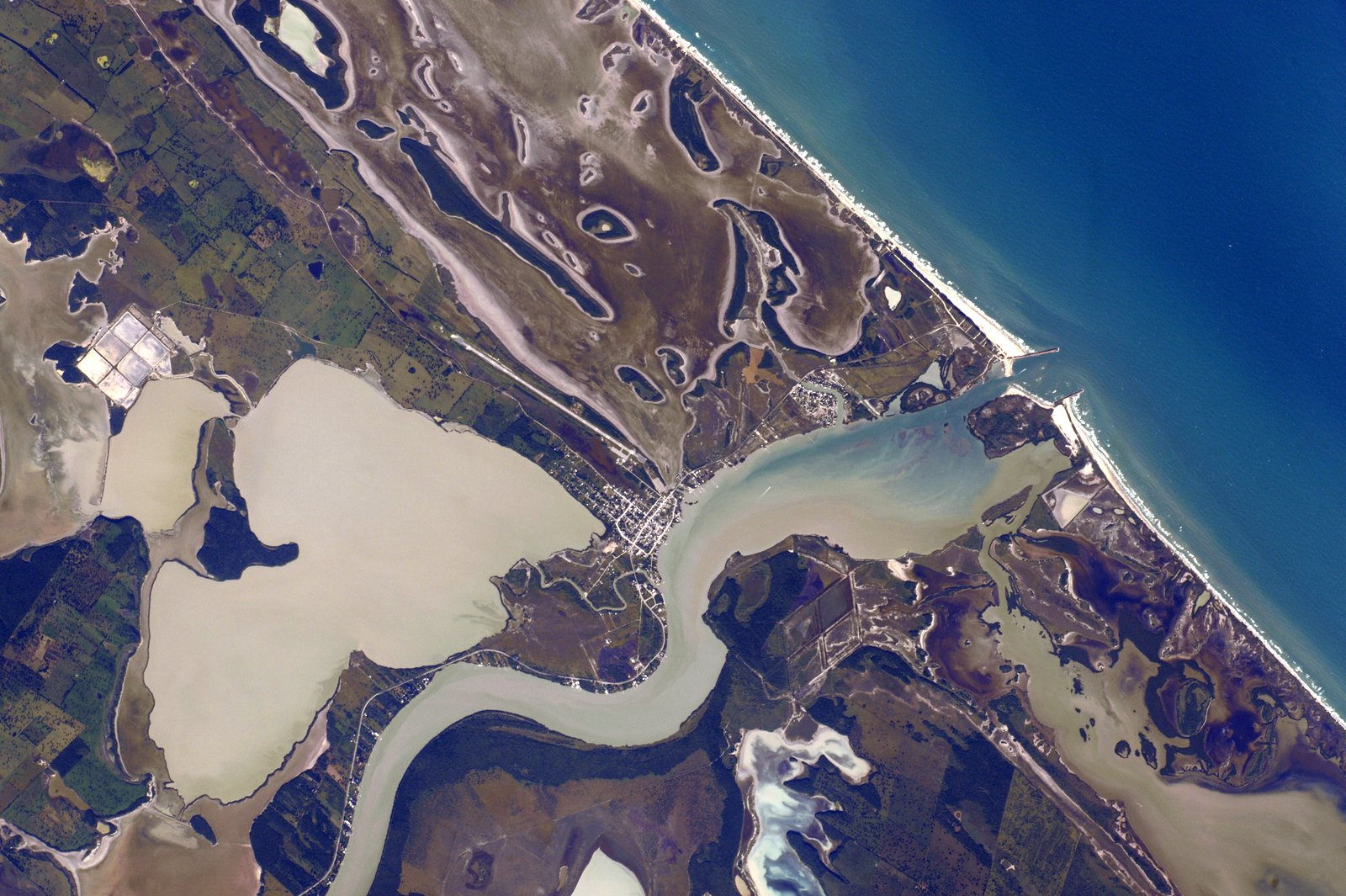

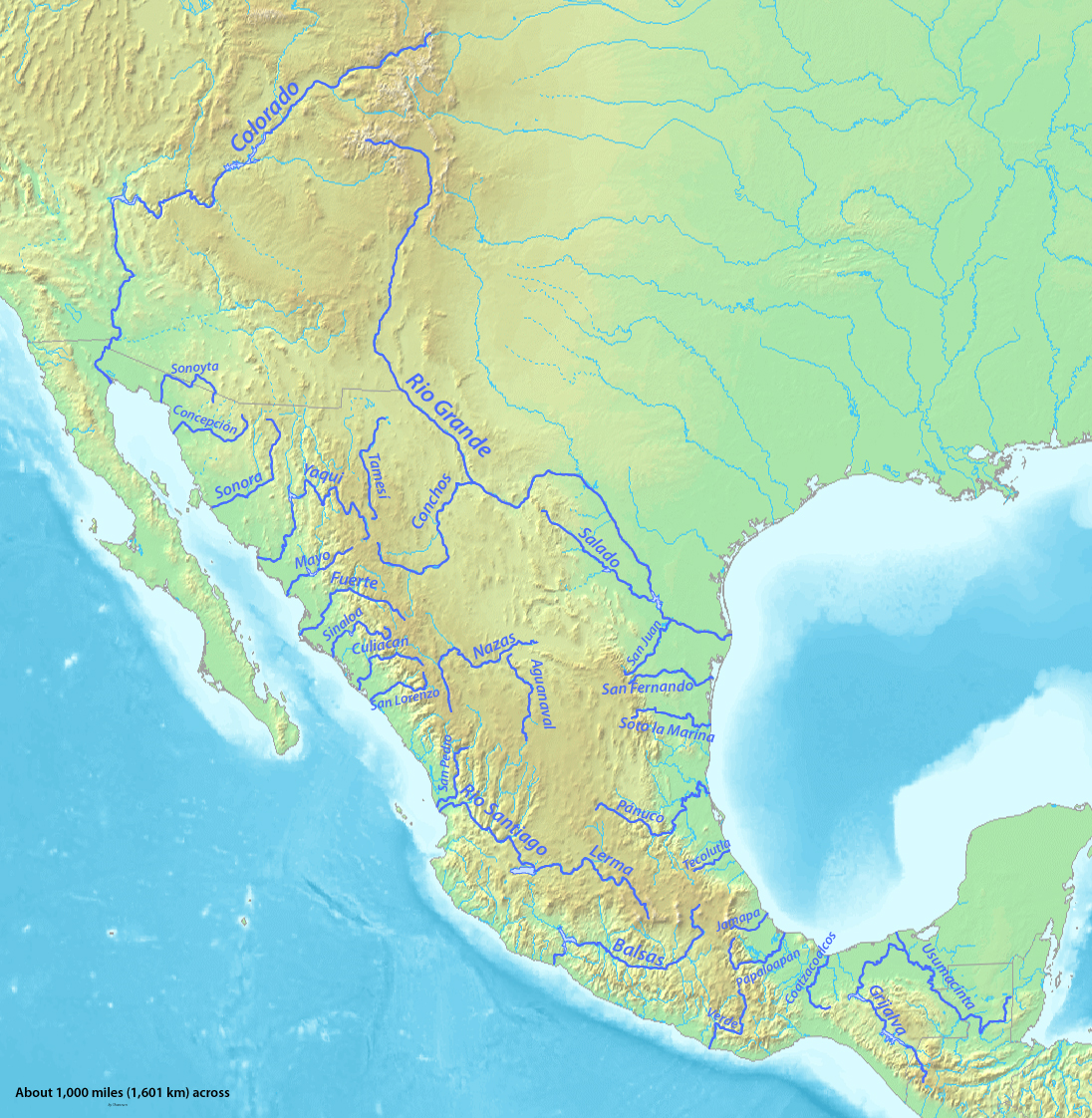
- Major rivers of Mexico, with Soto La Marina in the northeast of the country

Location
- Country: Mexico

Physical characteristics
- Source
  - location: General Zaragoza, Nuevo León
  - elevation: 3,000 m (9,800 ft)
- Mouth
  - location: Gulf of Mexico at La Pesca, Tamaulipas
  - elevation: 0 m (0 ft)
- Length: 416 km (258 mi)
- Basin size: 21,183 km^{2} (8,179 sq mi)
- Discharge
  - average: 2.086 million cubic metres per year (0.0661 m^{3}/s; 2.334 cu ft/s)

The Soto La Marina River or Soto la Marina is a river of northeastern Mexico.

== Geography ==
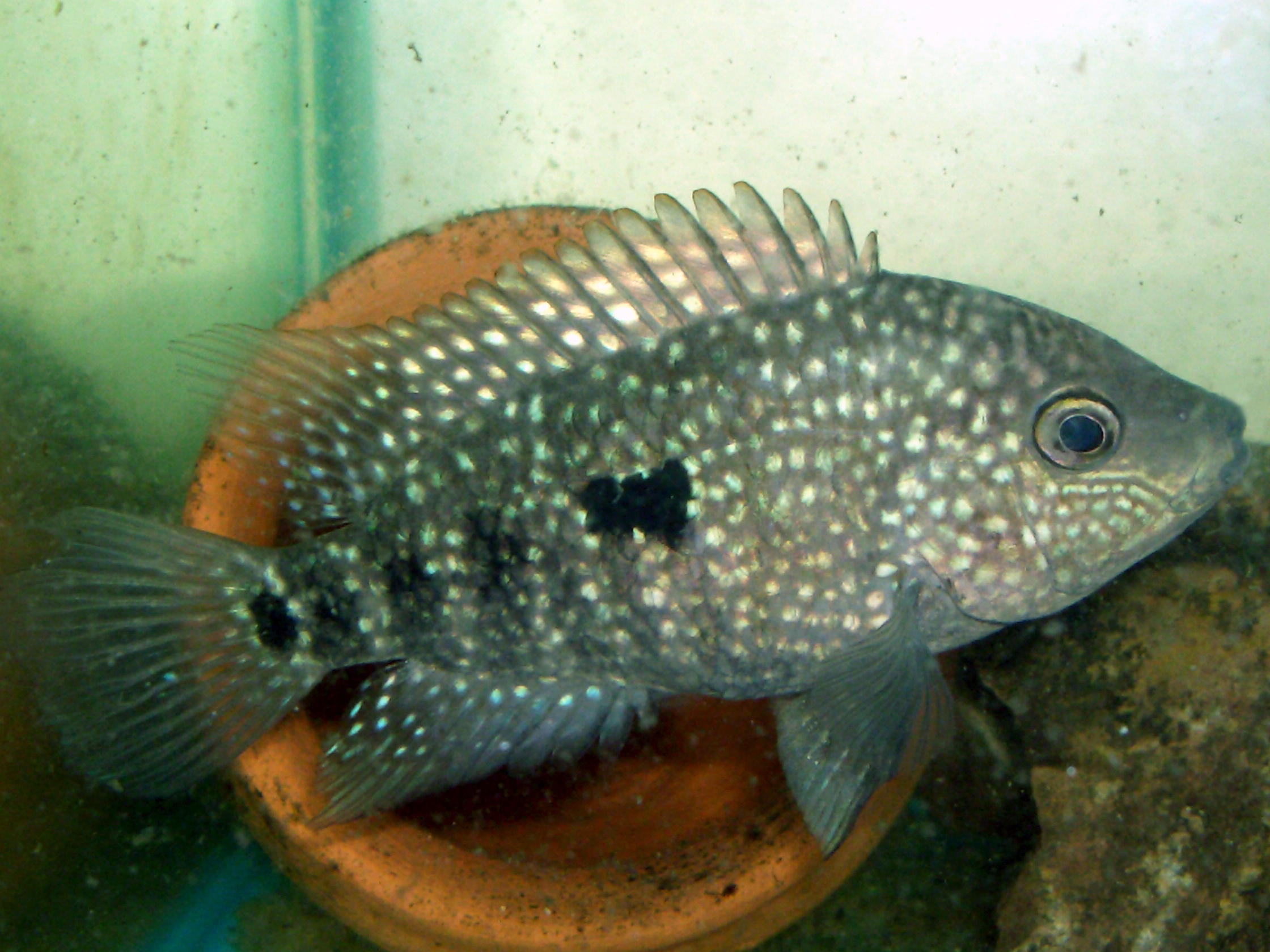
The cichlid fish Herichthys teporatus is only found in the Soto La Marina River basin

The headwaters of the Soto La Marina are in the Sierra Madre Oriental in pine-oak forests at an elevation of about 3,000 m (9,800 ft) in the municipality of General Zaragoza, Nuevo León. The vegetation at the headwaters is Sierra Madre Oriental pine-oak forest. Several scenic waterfalls are found near the town of General Zaragoza.

Called the Rio Blanco, the river initially flows north, then turns east near Aramberri and enters the state of Tamaulipas where it is called the Purificación river. The Rio Purificación joins with the Rio Corona near the town of Padilla, Tamaulipas where the river is damned to create the Vicente Guerrero Reservoir. From there downstream the river is called the Soto La Marina. Entering the coastal plain the river passes through the town of Soto La Marina. It forms a delta at its mouth and enters the Gulf of Mexico via two outlets. The lowest 50 kilometers (31 miles) of the river are navigable by boats. The Soto La Marina is the thirteenth longest river in Mexico.

The lower course of the Soto La Marina is through a semi-arid eco-region called Tamaulipan mezquital which is characterized by sub-tropical low trees and shrubs similar to what is found in southernmost Texas.

== History ==
The Spaniard Francisco de Garay discovered the Soto La Marina River in 1523. Garay, Governor of Jamaica, led an expedition of 600 men to form a colony on the Pánuco River, but landed by mistake one hundred miles north at the mouth of the Soto La Marina which he called the River of Palms (Rio de las Palmas). He reconnoitered by sending a small boat upriver about 25 miles, probably reaching the present day city of Soto la Marina. The explorers found 40 Indian encampments along the river, indicating a large population, although the Indians apparently did not practice agriculture. The Indians plied the river in canoes and, although initially friendly, became hostile. Realizing that the river was not the Pánuco, Garay ordered an overland march southward to the Panuco.

Some scholars have identified the Rio de las Palmas with the Rio Grande, but the majority view is that it was the Soto La Marina.

== See also ==
- List of longest rivers of Mexico
- List of rivers of Mexico
