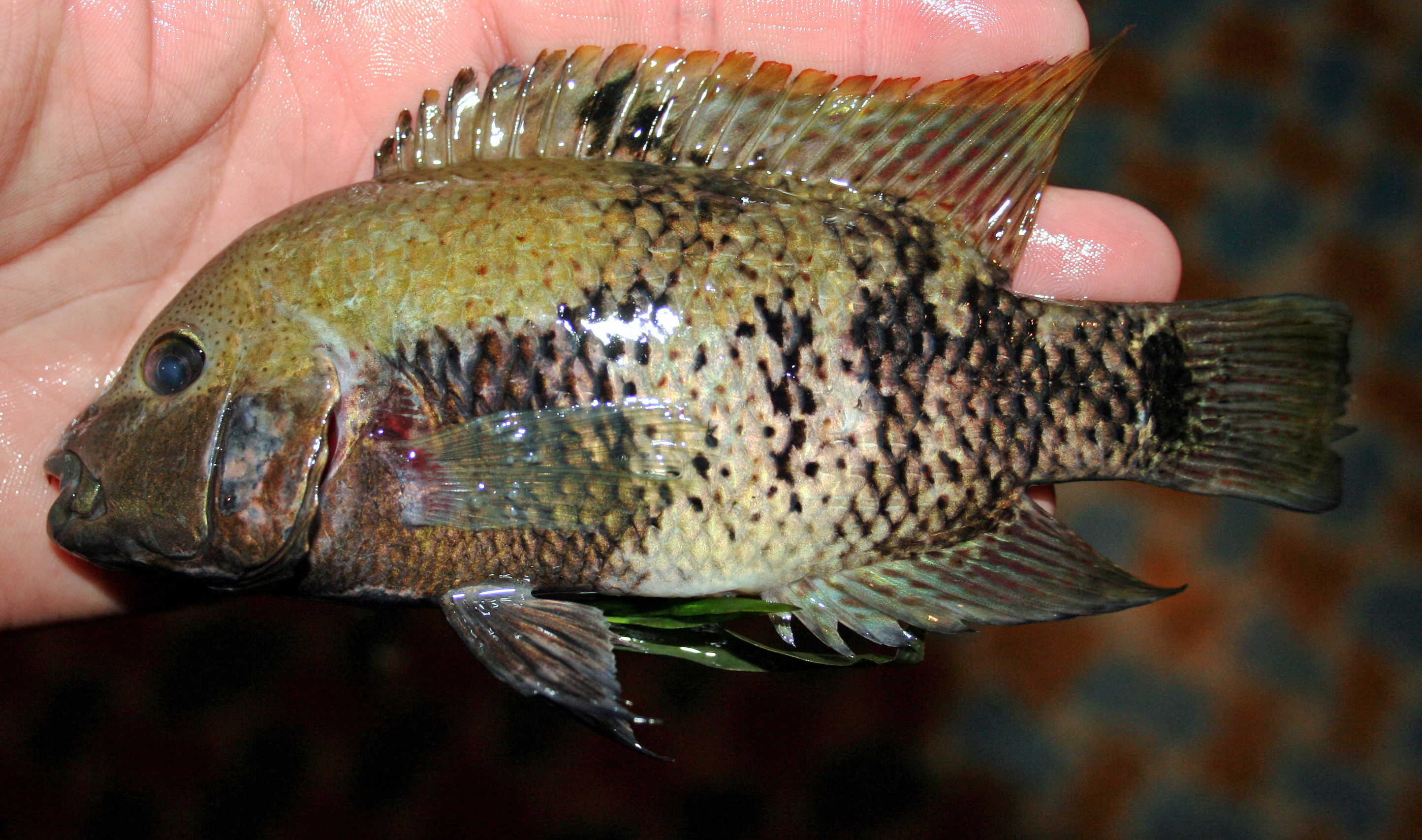
- Herichthys molango
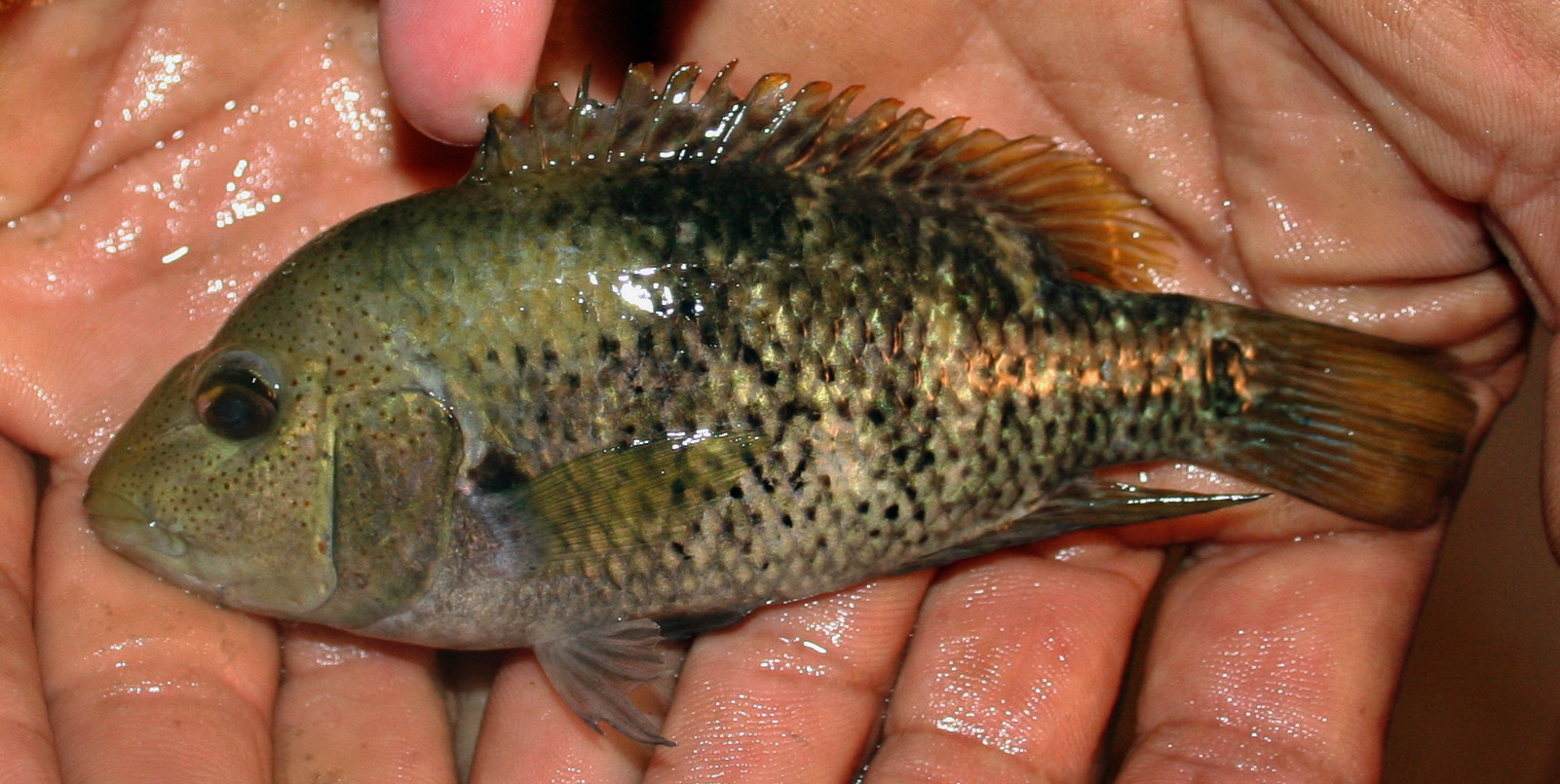
- Herichthys pratinus

Conservation status
- Least Concern (IUCN 3.1)

Scientific classification
- Kingdom: Animalia
- Phylum: Chordata
- Class: Actinopterygii
- Order: Cichliformes
- Family: Cichlidae
- Genus: Herichthys
- Species: H. pantostictus

Binomial name
- Herichthys pantostictus (J. N. Taylor & R. R. Miller, 1983)

Synonyms
- Cichlasoma pantostictus Taylor & Miller, 1983; Nosferatu pantostictus (Taylor & Miller, 1983); Herichthys molango De la Maza-Benignos & Lozano-Vilano, 2013; Herichthys pratinus De la Maza-Benignos & Lozano-Vilano, 2013

= Herichthys pantostictus =

Species of fish

Herichthys pantostictus, the Chairel cichlid or Atezca cichlid, is a species of cichlid native to the Panuco River drainage of Mexico's Atlantic coast where it is mostly found in moderately fast flowing rivers, slightly brackish, murky lakes and lagoons along the coast. A lacustrine form, formerly described as Herichthys molango and endemic to "Laguna Atezca" in the municipality of Molango, has now been extirpated by introduced species. The species reaches a maximum size of 12.6 centimetres (5 in) SL though most do not exceed 5.6 centimetres (2.2 in), and can also be found in the aquarium trade.
