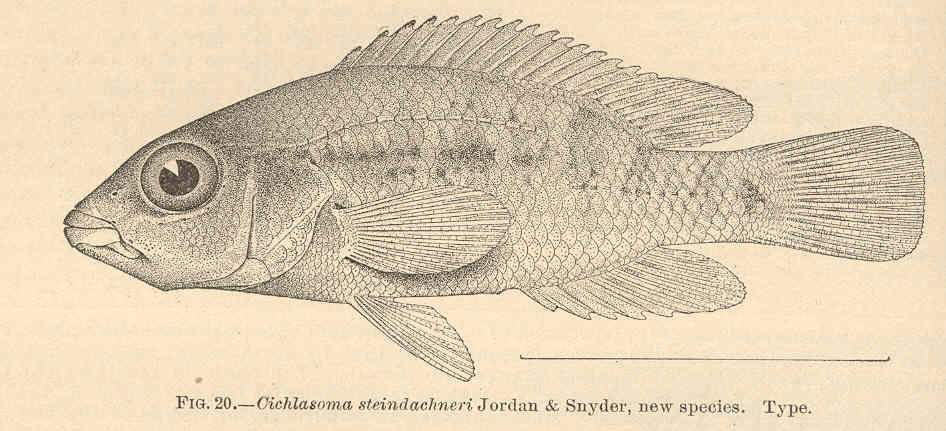

Conservation status
- Endangered (IUCN 3.1)

Scientific classification
- Kingdom: Animalia
- Phylum: Chordata
- Class: Actinopterygii
- Order: Cichliformes
- Family: Cichlidae
- Genus: Herichthys
- Species: H. steindachneri

Binomial name
- Herichthys steindachneri (D.S. Jordan & Snyder, 1899)

Synonyms
- Cichlasoma steindachneri Jordan & Snyder, 1899; Nosferatu steindachneri (Jordan & Snyder, 1899)

= Herichthys steindachneri =

Species of fish

Herichthys steindachneri, Steindachner's cichlid, is a species of cichlid endemic to Mexico where it is found in the Tamasopo, Gallinas and Ojo Frio Rivers of the Panuco River basin. It reaches a maximum size of 40.0 centimetres (15.7 in) SL. This species can also be found in the aquarium trade. The specific name honours the Austrian ichthyologist Franz Steindachner (1834-1919).
