= Mauricio De la Maza-Benignos =

Mexican ichthyologist, conservationist, and naturalist

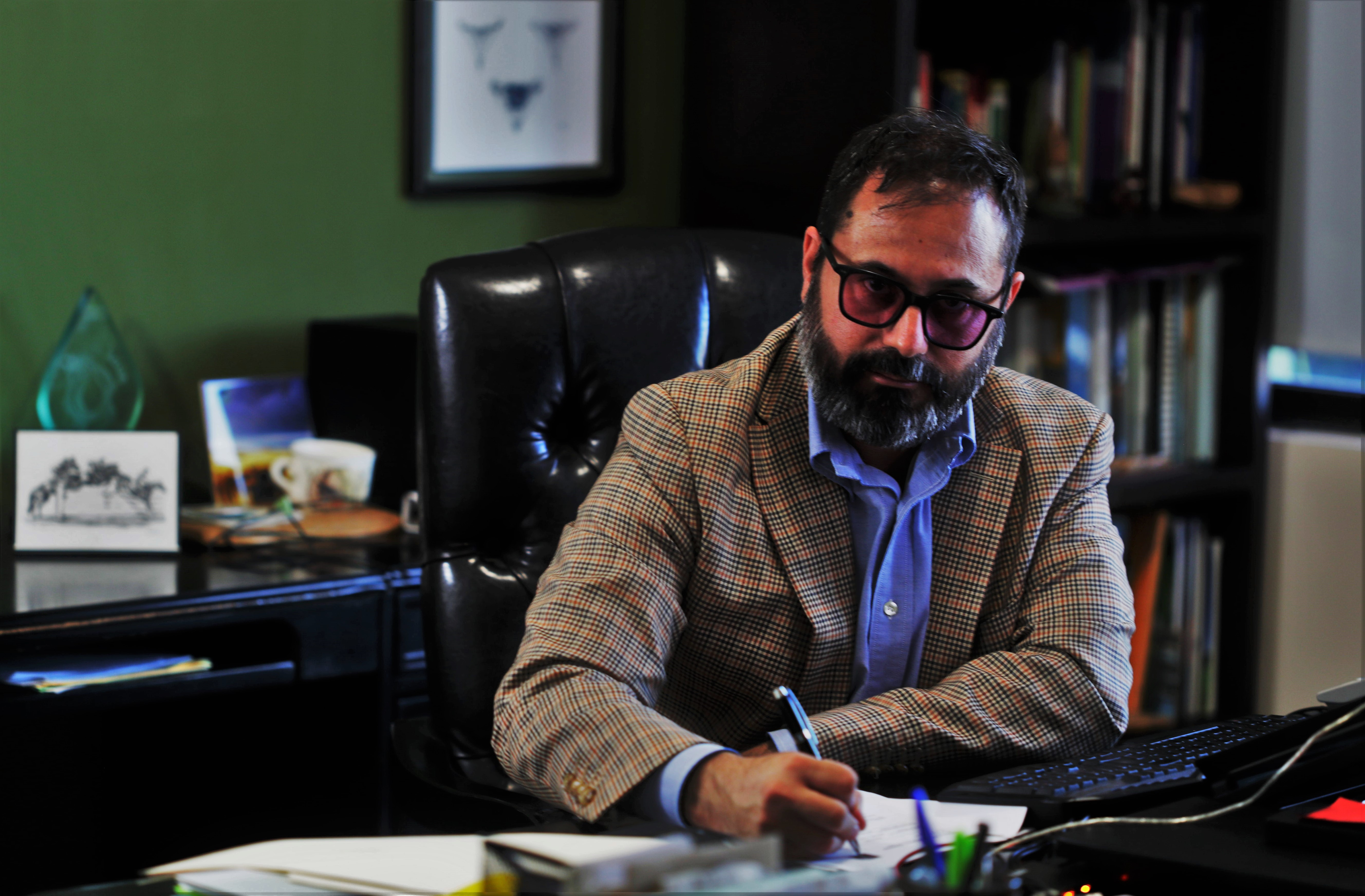
De la Maza-Benignos in 2018

Mauricio De la Maza-Benignos (born July 27, 1970) is a Mexican conservationist, naturalist, zoologist and filmmaker. He is also a member of Mexico's National System of Researchers. In addition to his work in ichthyology, he is an agronomist and zootechnician, a jurist, an administrator, and an editor.

== Education ==
He earned his bachelor's degree at the Monterrey Institute of Technology and Higher Education, a Master of Business Administration at The University of Lancaster, a Ph.D. summa cum laude, at the Autonomous University of Nuevo León, studied Law (with honorific mention of excellence), under a merit scholarship at the TecMilenio University., earned an MA (with honorific mention of excellence) in Cinematography, Multimedia, Script Writing and Film Directing from the "Escuela Superior de Cine y Multimedia Ilumina". In October 2021 he was awarded a Doctor honoris causa by the “Claustro Doctoral Honoris Causa, A.C.” which is conformed of a coalition of international universities for his professional career. In August 2021 he received the Presea Ray Tico Internacional (Gold mention) from the government, the people of Costa Rica, the artists community of that country, and the governments of Costa Rica and Mexico for his outstanding and excellent work and services as an artist, activist, and scientist in favour of both countries. In February 2020 he received the Conservation Award from the Arizona Game and Fish, for his professional career in favor of the wildlife and wetlands of the transboarder region between both countries. In 1994 he obtained the “Best students of Mexico Award” by the “National Permanent Committee for the Best Students of Mexico”, and in 2014 he was awarded first place in the “Dr. José Álvarez Del Villar” prize for his doctoral thesis, by the Mexican Ichthyology Society.

He developed his doctoral thesis under the direction of Professor and Ichthyologist Ma. de Lourdes Lozano-Vilano, with whom he continues to do research. He also collaborates with geneticist and ichthyologist Dr. Evan W. Carson at UNM, mainly in the area of conservation genetics. In 2015 he was awarded the UANL Research Prize to the best scholar paper in the Natural Sciences during 2014. From 2006―2011, he served as Director for the World Wide Fund for Nature (WWF), Chihuahuan Desert Program; and from 2011― as Conservation Science Director and Chief Executive Officer for Mexican NGO, Pronatura Noreste.

== Taxonomic contributions ==
His taxonomic contributions include categorizing and naming cichlids and pupfish, revising cichlid genera Herichthys and establishing Nosferatu. He also co-authored with renowned gastropod expert, Dr. Robert Hershler, Research Zoologist and Curator of Mollusca at the Smithsonian, and his team, on cochliopid snails from thermal springs in northern Mexico. His work includes:

- De La Maza-Benignos, M. & Lozano-Vilano, M.d.L. 2013. Description of three new species of the genus Herichthys (Perciformes: Cichlidae) from eastern Mexico, with redescription of H. labridens, H. steindachneri, and H. pantostictus. Zootaxa, 3734 (2): 101–129.
- De la Maza-Benignos. M., C.P. Ornelas-García, Ma. de L. Lozano-Vilano, M.E. García Ramírez, and I. Doadrio, 2014. Phylogeographic analysis of genus Herichthys (Perciformes: Cichlidae), with descriptions of Nosferatu new genus and H. tepehua n. sp. 2014. hydrobiologia. doi:10.1007/s10750-014-1891-8
- De la Maza-Benignos, M. and L. Vela-Valladares. 2009. "Cyprinodon julimes sp. nov". In: Los Peces del Río Conchos (editor: De la Maza-Benignos, M.). Alianza WWF - FGRA y Gobierno del Estado de Chihuahua.
- Hershler, R., J. J. Landye, L. Hsiu-Ping, M. De la Maza–Benignos, P. Ornelas & E.W. Carson. 2014. New species and records of Chihuahuan Desert springsnails, with a new combination for Tryonia brunei. Western North American Naturalist 74(1): 47–65.

== Conservation work ==
From 2006-2011, De la Maza-Benignos led the design and directed the implementation of the WWF-Rio Conchos and Rio Grande Project, which involved working with the governments of the US and Mexico, local NGOs and communities along the Rio Conchos, one of the primary tributaries of the Rio Grande/Río Bravo. The project focused on aspects of ecosystem, source water protection, and restoration, efficient water use, engaging in participatory platforms, improved water governance and policy development, public awareness and education. It provided training in the implementation of environmental flows, soil and water conservation techniques, biodiversity conservation, development of community action plans, and distribution of educational materials comprising basic social, economic and environmental information. Work centered on building capacity for freshwater and wildlife management, including large mammals and conserving the native Aparique trout and the Julimes pupfish, as part of the WWF-TCCC global partnership. Starting 2020, he serves in the Board of Advisors of the WCFF.

== Legal and policy work ==
De la Maza led the efforts that brought about, in 2014, the first concession of surface waters for “environmental use” in Mexico, within Cuatrociénegas' Area for Protection of Flora and Fauna, established by the National Commission for Natural Protected Areas (CONANP) in the state of Coahuila. "By this act, Mexico´s National Water Commission (CONAGUA) established the necessary legal mechanisms to ensure the security and legal certainty of water resources needed to protect priority ecosystems, thereby supporting the healthy environment to which every person in Mexico is entitled for his/her development and well-being under article 4 of the Mexican Constitution, while also promoting sustainable development of water resources.”
