= Fishkeeping =

Practice of containing fish

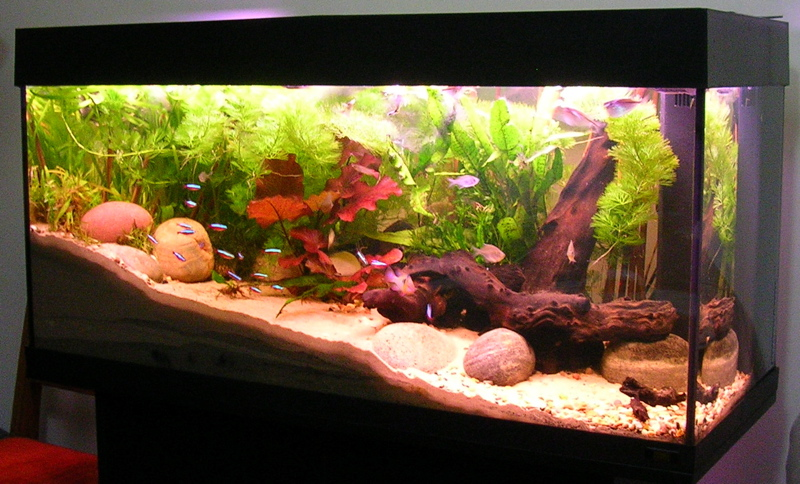
An aquascaped freshwater aquarium

Fishkeeping is a popular hobby, practiced by aquarists, concerned with keeping fish in a home aquarium or garden pond. It is a practice that encompasses the art of maintaining one's own aquatic ecosystem, featuring a lot of variety with various water systems, all of which have their own unique features and requirements. Fishkeeping primarily serves as a token of appreciation and fascination for marine life and the environment that surrounds such, along with other purposes such as the piscicultural fishkeeping industry, serving as a branch of agriculture, being one of the most widespread methods of cultivating fish for commercial profit.

Fishkeeping has existed for thousands of years, with some of the earliest known fishkeepers being Sumerians around 2500 BCE. During this period, aquarium owners did not fully understand the environmental requirements necessary to sustain marine life. Over time fishkeeping evolved as knowledge of aquatic biology improved, leading to the development of specialized tanks for different species and the incorporation of aquatic plants to create more balanced and natural habitats.

== Origins of fishkeeping ==
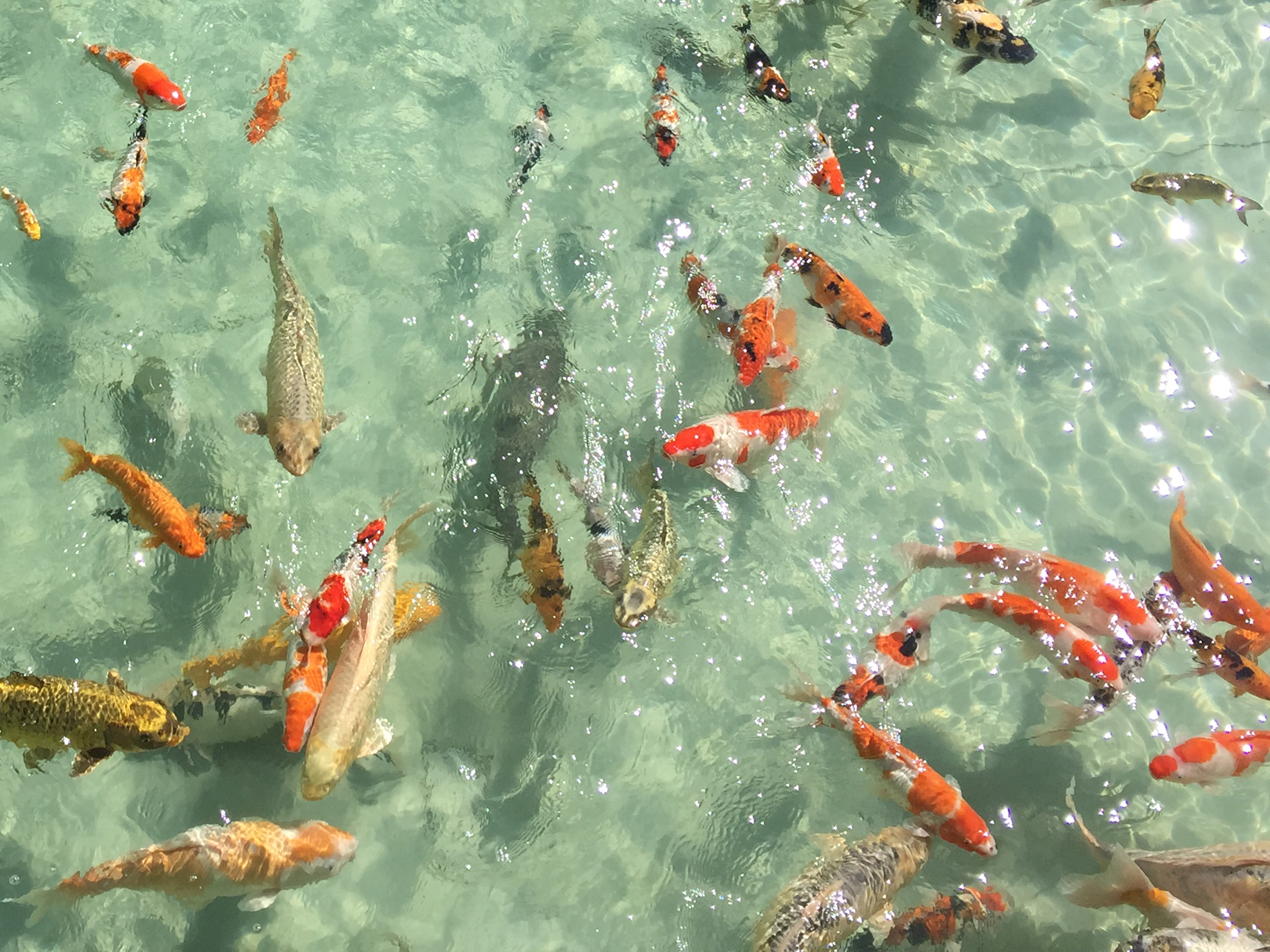
Koi (and goldfish) have been kept in decorative ponds for centuries in China and Japan.

Fish have been raised as food in pools and ponds for thousands of years. Brightly colored or tame specimens of fish in these pools have sometimes been valued as pets rather than food. Many cultures, ancient and modern, have kept fish for both functional and decorative purposes.

Ancient Sumerians kept wild-caught fish in ponds, before preparing them for meals. Depictions of the sacred fish of Oxyrhynchus kept in captivity in rectangular temple pools have been found in ancient Egyptian art.

Similarly, Asia has experienced a long history of stocking rice paddies with freshwater fish suitable for eating, including various types of catfish and cyprinid. Selective breeding of carp into today's popular and completely domesticated koi and fancy goldfish began over 2,000 years ago in Japan and China, respectively. The Chinese brought goldfish indoors during the Song dynasty to enjoy them in large ceramic vessels.

In medieval Europe, carp pools were a standard feature of estates and monasteries, providing an alternative to meat on feast days when meat could not be eaten for religious reasons.

Marine fish have been similarly valued for centuries. Wealthy Romans kept lampreys and other fish in salt water pools. Tertullian reports that Asinius Celer paid 8000 sesterces for a particularly fine mullet. Cicero reports that the advocate Quintus Hortensius wept when a favored specimen died. Rather cynically, he referred to these ancient fishkeepers as the Piscinarii, the "fish-pond owners" or "fish breeders", for example when saying that "the rich (I mean your friends the fish-breeders) did not disguise their jealousy of me".

The first person to breed a tropical fish in Europe was Pierre Carbonnier, who founded one of the oldest public aquaria in Paris in 1850, and bred the first imported Macropods (Paradise fish) in 1869, and later more species. A pioneer of tropical fish breeding, Carbonnier was awarded the Gold Medal of the Imperial French Acclimatization Society in 1875 for research and breeding of exotic freshwater aquarium fish, and for his success in introducing exotic fish species to France.

== Types of fishkeeping systems ==
Fishkeepers are often known as "aquarists" since many of them are not solely interested in keeping fish, but rather for the enjoyment and appreciation of aquatic life. The hobby can be broadly divided into three specific disciplines, depending on the type of water the fish originate from: freshwater, brackish, and marine (also called saltwater) fishkeeping.

=== Freshwater ===
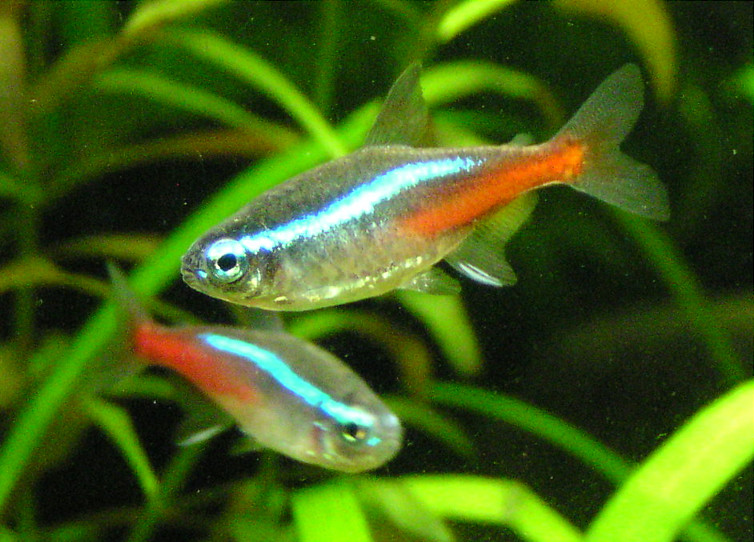
Neon tetras are common freshwater fish kept as pets.

Freshwater fishkeeping is the most common of the three disciplines, with even small pet stores often selling a variety of freshwater fish, such as goldfish, guppies, and angelfish. While most freshwater aquaria are community tanks containing a variety of compatible species, single-species breeding aquaria are also popular. Livebearing fish such as mollies and guppies are among those most easily raised in captivity, but aquarists also regularly breed many types of cichlid, catfish, characins, cyprinids, and killifish.

Many fishkeepers create freshwater aquascapes where the focus is on aquatic plants as well as fish. These aquaria include "Dutch aquaria" that mass contrasting stem plants, named for European aquarists who first designed them. In recent years, one of the most active advocates of the heavily planted aquarium was the Japanese aquarist Takashi Amano. A photographer who through his images of his own complex aquariums. He would then proceed to establish his own company "Aqua Design Amano" in 1982 to sell aquarium products "featuring excellent quality and design" to share his vision towards other aquarists.

Garden ponds are in some ways similar to freshwater aquaria, but are usually much larger and exposed to ambient weather. In the tropics, tropical fish can be kept in garden ponds. In the temperate zone, species such as goldfish, koi, and orfe work better.

=== Saltwater ===
Marine aquaria have more specific needs and requirements to maintain, and the livestock is generally more expensive. As a result, this branch tends to attract more experienced fishkeepers. Marine aquaria can be appealing from an aesthetics perspective, due to the attractive colors and shapes of the corals and the coral reef fish they host. Temperate zone marine fish are not as commonly kept in home aquaria, primarily because they do not thrive at room temperature. Coldwater aquaria must provide cooler temperature via a cool room (such as an unheated basement) or using a refrigeration device known as a 'chiller'.

Marine aquarists often attempt to recreate a coral reef in their aquaria using large quantities of living rock, porous calcareous rocks encrusted with coralline algae, sponges, worms, and other small marine organisms. Larger corals, as well as shrimps, crabs, echinoderms, and mollusks are added later on, once the aquarium has matured, as well as a variety of small fish. Such aquaria are sometimes called reef tanks.

=== Brackish water ===
Brackish water aquaria combine elements of the other types, with salinity that must stay between that of freshwater and seawater. Brackish water fish come from habitats with varying salinity, such as mangroves and estuaries, and do not thrive if kept permanently in freshwater. Although brackish water aquaria are not a common option chosen by many aquarists, brackish water hosts unique benefits that could be more suitable for traditional species within aquaria, as many species prefer brackish water, including some mollies, many gobies, some pufferfish, monos, and scats.

== Aquarium maintenance ==
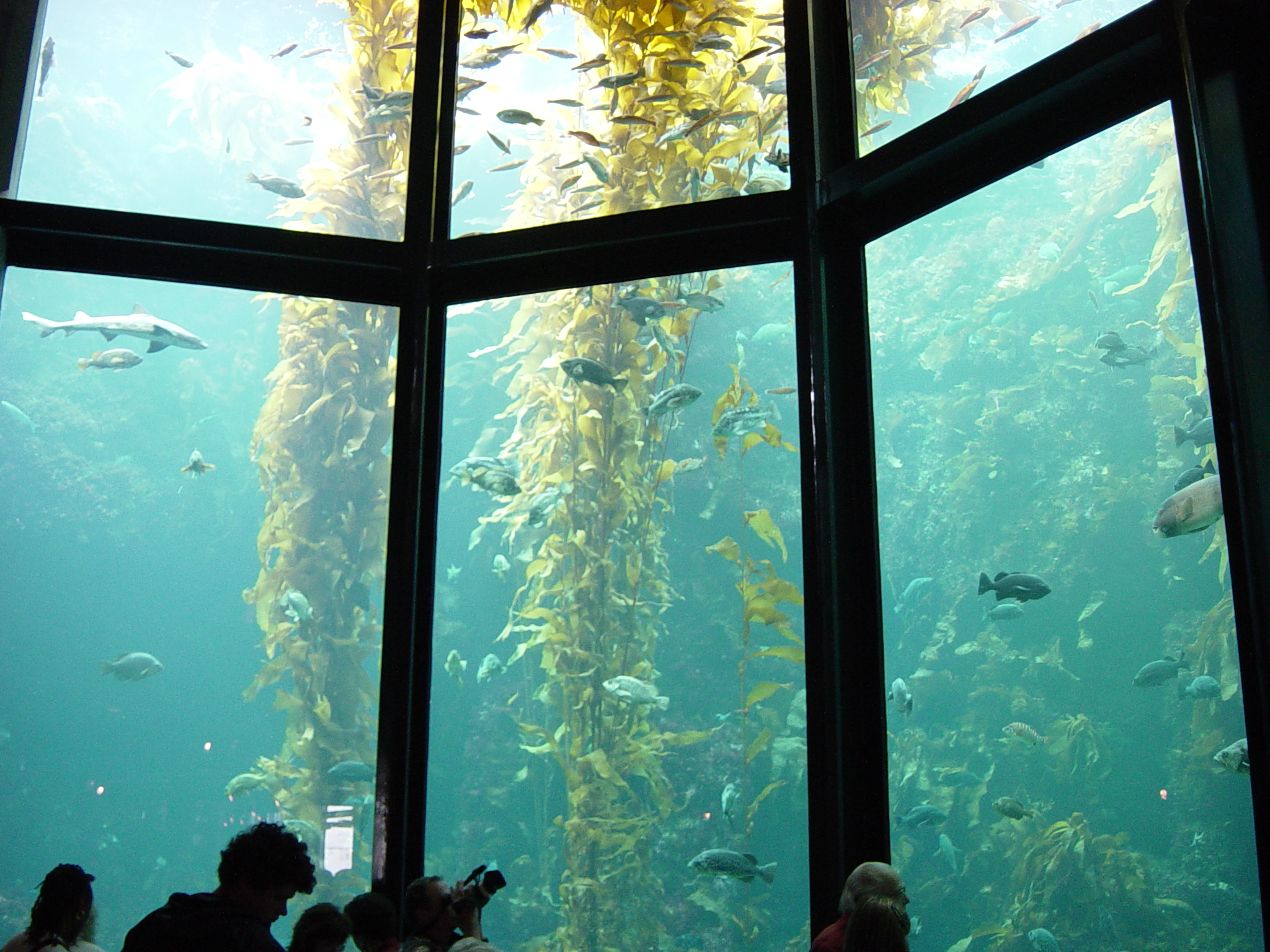
A 335,000 U.S. gallon (1.3 million litre) aquarium at the Monterey Bay Aquarium in California displaying a simulated kelp forest ecosystem

Ideal aquarium ecology reproduces the balance found in nature in the closed system of an aquarium. In practice, it is virtually impossible to maintain a perfect balance. As an example, a balanced predator-prey relationship is nearly impossible to maintain in even the largest aquaria. Typically, an aquarium keeper must actively maintain balance in the small ecosystems that aquaria provide. Basic aquarium maintenance should generally be performed weekly to maintain optimum conditions for fish and plants.

Balance is facilitated by larger volumes of water which dilute the effects of a systemic shock. For example, the death of the only fish in a 10-litre (2.2 imp gal; 2.6 US gal) tank causes dramatic changes in the system, while the death of that same fish in a 400-litre (88 imp gal; 110 US gal) tank that holds many fish may create only a minor imbalance. For this reason, hobbyists often favor larger tanks whenever possible, as they require less intensive attention. This same concept extends to the filtration system as well, external (outside of the tank) systems in particular. Generally speaking, the larger the filtration system depending on its configuration, the more capable it will be of properly maintaining an aquatic environment. External filtration systems provide the added benefit of increasing the overall volume of water and its dilution effect. For example, a 190-litre (42 imp gal; 50 US gal) aquarium with an external filter that holds 40 litres (8.8 imp gal; 11 US gal) creates a 230-litre (51 imp gal; 61 US gal) aquatic system, an increase of over twenty percent.

A variety of nutrient cycles is important in the aquarium. Imitating natural waves that would be found in natural bodies of water allows dissolved oxygen to be dispersed, causing the release of carbon dioxide. There are plenty of other vital processes and nutrients that are necessary for an aquarium to thrive. Nutritional cycles such as the phosphate and nitrogen cycle allow essential elements to support a stable environment. Consumption and waste both contribute greatly to these systems, including sulfur, iron, and other micronutrients. Appropriate handling of these factors, along with a balanced food supply and consideration of biological loading, is a requirement to keep these nutrient cycles in adequate equilibrium.

=== Water conditions ===
The solute content of water is perhaps the most important aspect of water conditions, as total dissolved solids and other constituents can dramatically impact basic water chemistry, and therefore how organisms interact with their environment. Salt content, or salinity, is the most basic classification of water conditions. Depending on the water system that an aquarist chooses, maintaining the proper range of salt content is essential for these ecosystems to survive and to properly reflect conditions that exist within a natural system. These ranges and simulations include freshwater (salinity below 0.5 PPT), simulating a lake or river environment; brackish water (a salt level of 0.5 to 30 PPT), simulating environments lying between fresh and salt, such as estuaries; and salt water or seawater (a salt level of 30 to 40 PPT), simulating an ocean or sea environment. Even higher salt concentrations are maintained in specialized tanks for raising brine organisms.

Several other water characteristics result from dissolved materials in the water and are important to the proper simulation of natural environments. Saltwater is typically alkaline, while the pH of fresh water varies. "Hardness" measures overall dissolved mineral content; hard or soft water may be preferred. Hard water is usually alkaline, while soft water is usually neutral to acidic. Dissolved organic content and dissolved gases content are also important factors.

Home aquarists typically use modified tap water supplied through their local water supply network. Because of the chlorine used to disinfect drinking water supplies for human consumption, tap water cannot be immediately used. In the past, it was possible to "condition" the water by simply letting the water stand for a day or two, which allows the chlorine to dissipate. However, monochloramine became popular in water treatment because it stays longer in the water. Additives are available to remove chlorine or chloramine and suffice to make the water ready. Brackish or saltwater aquaria require the addition of a mixture of salts and other minerals.

Aquarists with experience sometimes delve further into trying to find a homeostasis by using external resources to modify the water's alkalinity, hardness, or dissolved content of organics and gases. This can be accomplished by additives such as sodium bicarbonate to raise pH. Some aquarists filter or purify their water using one of two processes: deionization or reverse osmosis. In contrast, public aquaria with large water needs often locate themselves near a natural water source (such as a river, lake, or ocean) in order to have easy access to water that requires only minimal treatment.

Water temperature forms the basis of one of the two most basic aquarium classifications: tropical vs. cold water. Most fish and plant species tolerate only a limited range of water temperatures: Tropical or warm water aquaria maintain an average temperature of about 25 °C (77 °F) are much more common, and tropical fish are among the most popular aquarium denizens. Cold water aquaria maintain temperatures below the room temperature. More important than the range is temperature consistency; most organisms are not accustomed to sudden changes in temperatures, which can cause shock and lead to disease. Water temperature can be regulated with a combined thermometer and heating or cooling unit.

Water movement can also be important in accurately simulating a natural ecosystem. Fish may prefer anything from nearly still water up to swift, simulated currents. Water movement can be controlled through the use of aeration from air pumps, powerhead pumps, and careful design of water flow (such as the location of filtration system points of inflow and outflow).

=== Nitrogen cycle ===
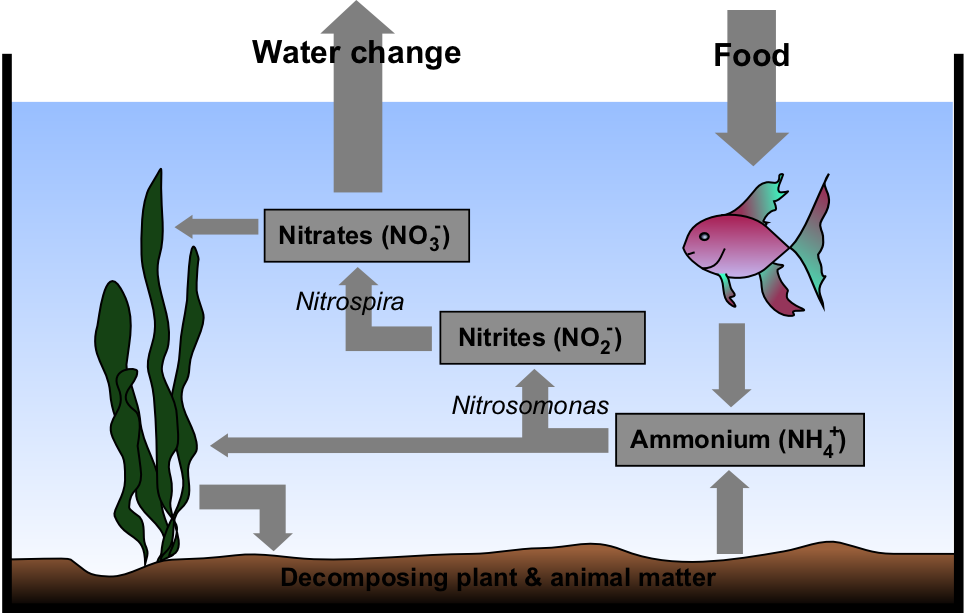
The nitrogen cycle in an aquarium

Fish are animals and generate waste as they metabolize food, which aquarists must manage. Fish, invertebrates, fungi, and some bacteria excrete nitrogen in the form of ammonia (which converts to ammonium in acidic water) and must then pass through the nitrogen cycle. Ammonia is also produced through the decomposition of plant and animal matter, including fecal matter and other detritus. Nitrogen waste products become toxic to fish and other aquarium inhabitants above a certain concentration. Ammonia is toxic to fish and other aquatic life in large quantities and that is why many fish keepers purchase testing kits to monitor the levels of ammonia in their water as well as monitoring nitrites and nitrates which are also part of the nitrogen cycle. Ammonia is produced from fish waste and uneaten food, after this is created it is broken down into nitrites by beneficial bacteria that is present in a properly cycled aquarium. Nitrites are then further broken down into the less toxic nitrates which can be absorbed by aquarium plants and nitrates absorbing filter media. Aquarists also use water changes as a way to keep these toxins under control by removing water from the aquarium and vacuuming fish waste and food from the gravel and replacing it with fresh, treated water.

==== The process ====
A well-balanced tank contains organisms that metabolize the waste products of other inhabitants. Nitrogenous waste is metabolized in aquaria by a group of bacteria known as nitrifiers (genus Nitrosomonas). Nitrifying bacteria metabolize ammonia into nitrite, which is highly toxic to fish, even at low concentrations. Another type of bacteria (genus Nitrospira), converts this nitrite into the less toxic compound, nitrate. This process represents a portion of the nitrogen cycle.

In a planted aquarium, aquatic plants also metabolize ammonium and nitrate as nutrients, removing them from the water column primarily through leaf surfaces. Plants remove some nutrients through their roots, either in or at the substrate level or via aerial roots floating in the water. Additional nitrogen and other nutrients are also made available for root uptake by decomposing organic matter in the substrate as well as the breakdown of mulm. While very small amounts of rotting foliage may be allowed to decompose and cycle nitrogen back into a planted aquarium, in practice aquarists will prune and remove substantial amounts of plant litter.

==== Maintaining the nitrogen cycle ====
Although called the nitrogen "cycle" by hobbyists, in aquaria the cycle is not complete: nitrogen must be added (usually indirectly through food) and nitrates must be removed at the end. Nitrogen bound up in plant matter is removed when the plant grows too large.

Hobbyist aquaria typically do not have the requisite bacteria needed to detoxify nitrogen waste. This problem is most often addressed through filtration. Activated carbon filters absorb nitrogen compounds and other toxins from the water.

Biological filters provide a medium specially designed for colonization by the desired nitrifying bacteria. Activated carbon and other substances, such as ammonia absorbing resins, stop working when their pores fill, so these components have to be replaced with fresh stocks periodically.

New aquaria often have problems associated with the nitrogen cycle due to insufficient beneficial bacteria, which is known as "New Tank Syndrome". Therefore, new tanks have to mature before stocking them with fish. There are three basic approaches to this: the fishless cycle, the silent cycle, and slow growth.

- Tanks undergoing a "fishless cycle" have no fish. Instead, the keeper adds ammonia (or ammonia sources like food or waste) to feed the bacteria. During this process, ammonia, nitrite, and nitrate levels measure progress.
- The "silent cycle" involves adding fast-growing plants and relying on them to consume the nitrogen, filling in for the bacteria work until their number increases. Anecdotal reports indicate that such plants can consume nitrogenous waste so efficiently that the ammonia and nitrite spikes that occur in more traditional cycling methods are greatly reduced or undetectable.
- "Slow growth" entails slowly increasing the fish population over 6 to 8 weeks, giving bacteria time to grow and reach a balance with the increasing waste production.

Adding too many fish too quickly or failing to allow enough time for the bacteria colony to establish itself in the filter media can lead to ammonia stress. This is not always fatal but can result in the death of aquarium fish. A few days after adding hardy fish for the cycling process, it is essential to look out for the key signs of ammonia stress. These include a lack of movement and appetite, inflammation and redness of the gills, fins, and body, and occasionally gasping for air at the water's surface. The latter can also be attributed to poor aeration, which can be negated by the inclusion of an air pump or spray bar in the setup.

The largest bacterial populations inhabit the filter; efficient filtration is vital. Sometimes, simply cleaning the filter is enough to seriously disturb the aquarium's balance. Best practice is to flush mechanical filters using compatible water to dislodge organic materials while preserving bacteria populations. Another safe practice involves cleaning only one-half of the filter media every time the filter or filters are serviced to allow the remaining bacteria to repopulate the cleaned half.

=== Tank capacity ===
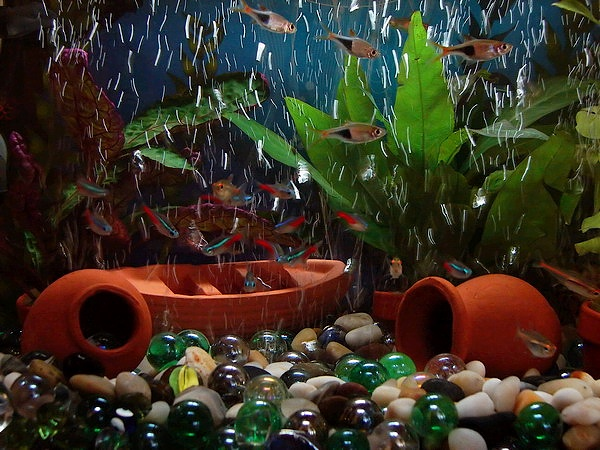
A freshwater aquarium with harlequin rasboras, neon tetras and glowlight tetras

Biological loading is a measure of the burden placed on the aquarium ecosystem by its living inhabitants. Higher biological loading represents a more complicated ecology, which makes equilibrium easier to imbalance. The surface area of water exposed to air limits dissolved oxygen. The population of nitrifying bacteria is limited by the available physical space which includes all surfaces in the aquarium such as the inner facing sides and the surface of rock substrate and any objects such as large rocks or pieces of wood.

==== Tank size ====
The Georgia Aquarium

Fish capacity is a function of aquarium size. Limiting factors include the availability of oxygen in the water and the rate at which the filter can process waste. Aquarists apply rules of thumb estimating appropriate population size; the examples below are for small freshwater fish. Larger freshwater fish and most marine fishes need much more generous allowances. Some aquarists claim that increasing water depth beyond some relatively shallow minimum does not affect capacity.

- 1.5 litres of water for each centimetre of fish length (1 US gallon per inch).
- 30 square centimetres of surface area per centimetre of fish length (12 square inches per inch).

Experienced aquarists warn against mechanically applying these rules because they do not consider other important issues such as growth rate, activity level, social behavior, and such. Once the tank nears capacity, the best practice is to add the remaining fish over a period of time while monitoring water quality.

The capacity can be improved by surface movement and water circulation such as through aeration, which not only improves oxygen exchange but also the decomposition of waste materials. Capacity can also be increased with the addition of external filtration which increases the total volume of water in the aquatic system.

==== Other factors ====
Other variables affect tank capacity. Smaller fish consume more oxygen per unit of body weight than larger fish. Labyrinth fish can breathe atmospheric oxygen and need less surface area (however, some are territorial, and do not tolerate crowding). Barbs require more surface area than tetras of comparable size. The presence of waste materials presents itself as a variable as well. Decomposition consumes oxygen, reducing the amount available for fish. Oxygen dissolves less readily in warmer water, while warmer water temperature increase fish activity levels, which in turn consume more oxygen.

== Fishkeeping industry ==
Worldwide, the fishkeeping hobby is a multibillion-dollar industry. The United States is the largest market, followed by Europe and Japan. In 1993, the United States Census Bureau found that 10.6% of U.S. households owned ornamental freshwater or saltwater fish, with an average of 8.8 fish per household. In 2002, census data indicated that aquarium products and fishing accounted for US$684 million.

=== Aquatic suppliers ===
From 1989 to 1992, almost 79% of all U.S. ornamental fish imports came from Southeast Asia and Japan. Singapore, Thailand, the Philippines, Hong Kong, and Indonesia were the top five exporting nations. South America was the second largest exporting region, accounting for 14% of the total annual value. Colombia, Brazil, and Peru were the major suppliers.

Approximately 200 million fish worth $44.7 million were imported into the United States in 1992. These fish comprised 1,539 different species; 730 freshwater species, and 809 saltwater species. Freshwater fish accounted for approximately 96% of the total volume and 80% of the total import value. Only 32 species had import values over $10,000. The top species were freshwater and accounted for 58% of the total imported value. The top imported species are the guppy, neon tetra, platy, betta, Chinese algae eater, and goldfish. Given 91.9 million total US households in 1990, 9.7 million are fishkeepers. 8.8 fish per household implies a total aquarium fish population of approximately 85.7 million, suggesting that the US aquarium fish population turns over more than 2.3 times per year, counting only imported fish.

In 2012, it is estimated that the aquarium industry is to generate revenues over $300 million with the annual growth rate of 14%.

Historically, fish and plants for the first modern aquaria were gathered from the wild and transported (usually by ship) to Europe and America. During the early 20th century many species of small colorful tropical fish were exported from Manaus, Brazil; Bangkok, Thailand; Jakarta, Indonesia; the Netherlands Antilles; Kolkata, India; and other tropical countries. Import of wild fish, plants, and invertebrates for aquaria continues today around the world. Many species have not been successfully bred in captivity. In many developing countries, locals survive by collecting specimens for the aquarium trade and continue to introduce new species to the market.

Today, the ornamental fish trade has expanded significantly, estimated to experience growth of approximately $4.49 billion between 2024 and 2028. Southeast Asian countries still continue to be the most dominant force of exporters, however, more countries from that area and even other regions of the world are showing evidence of being able to provide a competitive market. New countries from the Southeast include smaller regions that can still match the volume exports of countries like Japan; including Sri Lanka, Malaysia, and Myanmar. Additionally, some European countries have joined the higher ranks of exporting nations; including Netherlands and Czech Republic.

=== Animal welfare ===
Fish are sometimes maintained in inadequate conditions by aquarists who may make errors that are detrimental to the purpose of the hobby, such as keeping too many fish in one tank, or adding fish too quickly into an immature aquarium, resulting in the accidental deaths of many fish. This has caused the hobby to receive criticism and concern among some animal welfare groups, such as PETA, who accuse aquarists of treating aquarium fish as cheap toys to be replaced when they die.

Goldfish and bettas, in particular, have often been kept in small bowls or aquaria that are too small for their needs. In some cases, fish have been installed in all sorts of inappropriate objects such as the "AquaBabies Micro Aquaria", "Bubble Gear Bubble Bag", and "Betta in a Vase", all of which house live fish in unfiltered and insufficient water. The last is sometimes marketed as a complete ecosystem because a plant is included in the neck of the vase. Some sellers say the fish eat the plant roots. However, bettas are carnivorous and need live food or pellet foods. They cannot survive on plant roots. Another problem is that the plant sometimes blocks the betta's passage to the water surface. They are labyrinth fish and need to breathe at the surface to avoid suffocation.

Such products are aimed at people looking for a novelty gift. Aquarists actively condemn them. Similarly, the awarding of goldfish as prizes at funfairs is traditional in many parts of the world but has been criticized by aquarists and activists as cruel and irresponsible. The United Kingdom outlawed live-animal prizes such as goldfish in 2004.

The use of live prey to feed carnivorous fish such as piranhas also draws criticism.

Fish modification

Modifying fish to make them more attractive as pets is increasingly controversial. Historically, artificially dyeing fish was common. Glassfish, in particular, were often injected with fluorescent dyes. The British fishkeeping magazine Practical Fishkeeping has campaigned to remove these fish from the market by educating retailers and aquarists to the cruelty and health risks involved.

In 2006, Practical Fishkeeping published an article exposing the techniques for performing cosmetic surgery on aquarium fish, without anesthesia, as described by Singaporean fishkeeping magazine Fish Love Magazine. The tail is cut off and dye is injected into the body. The piece also included the first documented evidence to demonstrate that parrot cichlids are injected with coloured dye. Hong Kong suppliers were offering a service in which fish could be tattooed with company logos or messages using a dye laser; such fishes have been sold in the UK under the name of kaleidoscope gourami and striped parrot cichlid. Some people give their fish body piercings.

Hybrid fish such as flowerhorn cichlids and blood parrot cichlids are controversial. Blood parrot cichlids in particular have a very unnatural shape that prevents them from swimming properly and makes it difficult for them to engage in normal feeding and social behaviors. The biggest concern with hybrids is that they may be bred with native species, making it difficult for hobbyists to identify and breed particular species. This is especially important to hobbyists who shelter species that are rare or extinct in the wild. Extreme mutations have been selected for by some breeders; some fancy goldfish varieties in particular have features that prevent the fish from swimming, seeing, or feeding properly.

Genetically modified fish such as the GloFish are likely to become increasingly available, particularly in the United States and Asia. Although GloFish are unharmed by their genetic modifications, they remain illegal in many places, including the European Union, though at least some have been smuggled into the EU, most likely from Taiwan, via the Czech Republic.

== Fish breeding ==
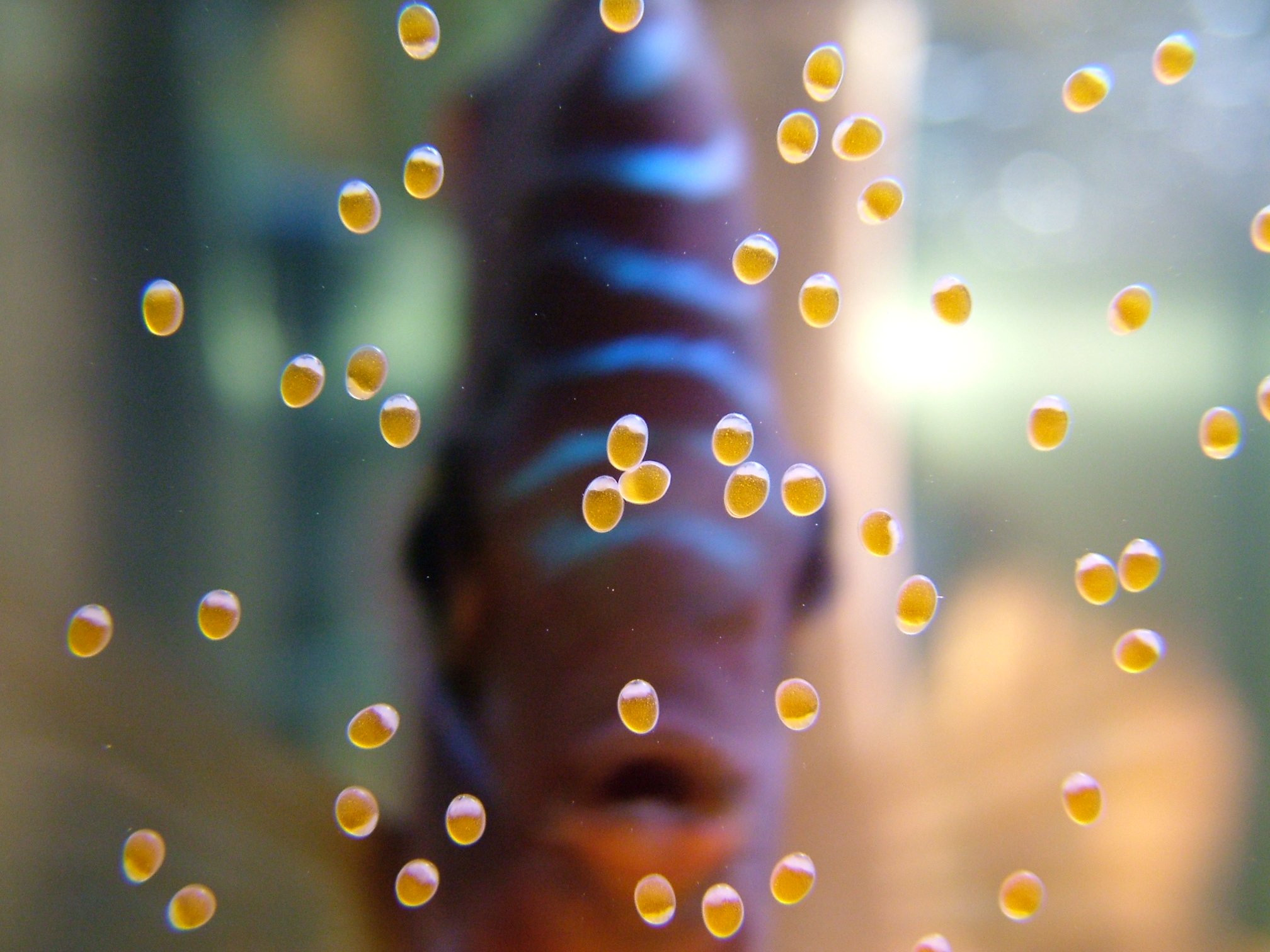
A discus (Symphysodon spp.) guarding its eggs

Fish breeding is a challenge that attracts many aquarists. While some species reproduce freely in community tanks, most require special conditions, known as spawning triggers before they will breed. The majority of fish lay eggs, known as spawning, and the juvenile fish that emerge are very small and need tiny live food or substitutes to survive. A fair number of popular aquarium fish are livebearers which produce a small number of relatively large offspring. These usually eat fish flakes that are ground into an appropriate size.

== Conservation ==
The two main sources of fish for aquaria are from capture in the wild or captive breeding. United Nations studies show that more than 90% of freshwater aquarium fish are captive–bred, while virtually all marine fish and invertebrates are wild-caught. Freshwater fish habitats are threatened by habitat erosion from pollution, dams and hydropower, commercial fishing, climate change, the introduction of invasive species and disease. The few marine species bred in captivity supplement but rarely replace the trade in wild-caught specimens. Wild-caught animals provide valuable income for people in regions lacking other high-value exports.

Marine fish are typically less resilient during transport than freshwater fish with relatively large numbers of them dying before they reach the aquarist. Although the aquarium trade is viewed as a minor threat to coral reefs compared to habitat destruction, fishing for food, and climate change, it is a booming trade and may be a serious problem in specific locations such as the Philippines and Indonesia where most collecting is done. Catching fish in the wild can reduce their population sizes, placing them in danger of extinction in collecting areas, as has been observed with the dragonet Synchiropus splendidus.

=== Collecting ===
In theory, reef fish should be a good example of a renewable resource that encourages fishermen to maintain the integrity and diversity of the natural habitat: more and better fish can be exported from pristine habitats than those that have been polluted or over-harvested. However, this has not been the case in similar industries such as fur trapping, logging, or fishing that experience the tragedy of the commons.

Fish are caught by net, trap, or cyanide. Collecting expeditions can be lengthy and costly, and are not always successful. Fish can also be injured during collection and/or shipping; mortality rates during shipping are high. Many others are weakened by stress and become diseased.

Other problems include the poisoning of coral reefs and non-target species, the depletion of rare species from their natural habitat, and ecosystem degradation from large scale removal of key species. Additionally, destructive fishing techniques concern environmentalists and hobbyists alike. There has been a concerted movement to captive breeding and certification programs for wild-caught fish. Two thirds of American marine aquarists surveyed in 1997 preferred farmed coral and over 80% think that only sustainably caught or farmed fish should be traded. Annually, 30 million fish from over 1,400 species are traded, with approximately 16 million imported into the United States. This trade has an estimated global value of over $800 million in 2002.

==== Cyanide ====
Cyanide is a poison that stuns and immobilizes fish. Fishermen put cyanide in the ocean to ease the process of netting fish. It can irreversibly damage or kill the target fish, as well as other fish, mammals, reptiles or invertebrates that are left behind. Some wholesalers advertise that they avoid cyanide-caught animals. In the Philippines, overfishing and cyanide caused a drastic decline in aquarium fish, leading the country away from cyanide and towards netting healthy animals.

=== Captive breeding and aquaculture ===
Since the Siamese fighting fish (Betta splendens) was first successfully bred in France in 1893, captive spawning and brooding techniques used in aquaculture have slowly improved. Captive breeding for aquaria is concentrated in southern Florida, Singapore, Hong Kong and Bangkok, with smaller industries in Hawaii and Sri Lanka. Captive breeding of marine organisms has been in development since the mid-1990s. Breeding for freshwater species is more advanced than for saltwater species. Currently, only a few captive-bred marine species are in the trade, including clownfish, damselfish, and dwarf angelfish.

Aquaculture can help in lessening the impacts on wild stocks, either by using cultivated organisms for sale or by releasing them to replenish wild stocks. Breeding programs help preserve species that have become rare or extinct in the wild, most notably the Lake Victoria cichlids.

Some species have also become important as laboratory animals. Cichlids, poecilids and zebra danios are especially important for studies on learning, mating, and social behavior. Hobbyists also keep and observe many fishes not otherwise studied, and thereby provide valuable ecological and behavioral data.

Captive breeding has reduced prices for hobbyists, but cultured animals remain more expensive. Selective breeding has also led to wider intra–species variation, creating more diverse commercial stocks.

=== Invasive species ===
Serious problems can occur when fish originally raised in ponds or aquaria are released into the wild. While tropical fish do not survive in temperate climates, they can thrive in waters that are similar to their native habitat. Non–native species that become established are called exotic species. Freshwater examples include various cichlids in Florida, goldfish in temperate waters, and South American suckermouth catfishes in warm waters around the world. Invasive species can seriously disrupt their new homes by preying on, or competing with, native species. Many marine fish have also been introduced into non-native waters, disrupting the local habitat.

=== Humane treatment ===
In January 2011 the Maui County Council passed a measure requiring aquarium fisheries to adopt humane practices for preparing fish for transport to market. The regulations control harvesting and shipping practices, including prohibiting clipping the fins on fish to protect the plastic shipping bags, outlawing puncturing swim bladders that fish use to regulate their buoyancy, which enabled divers to rapidly surface and prohibiting "starving" the fish which permitted smaller shipping bags without killing the fish with their own waste. The measure also requires that shippers file mortality reports on the animals they ship.

== See also ==
- Fish farming
- List of aquarium fish by scientific name
