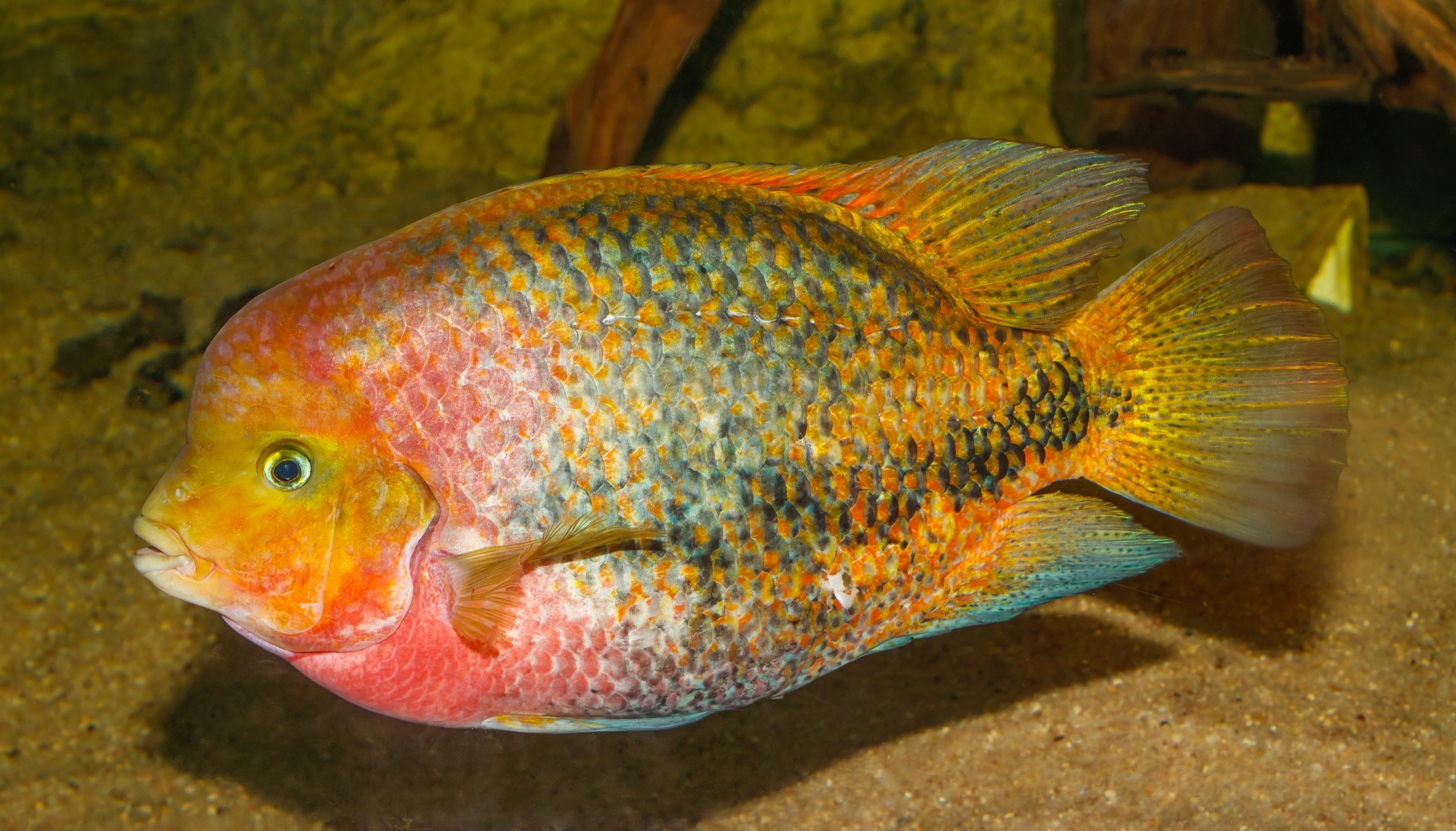

Conservation status
- Data Deficient (IUCN 3.1)

Scientific classification
- Kingdom: Animalia
- Phylum: Chordata
- Class: Actinopterygii
- Order: Cichliformes
- Family: Cichlidae
- Genus: Vieja
- Species: V. melanurus

Binomial name
- Vieja melanurus (Günther, 1862)

Synonyms
- Heros melanurus Günther, 1862; Cichlasoma melanurum (Günther, 1862); Paraneetroplus melanurus (Günther, 1862); Heros melanopogon Steindachner, 1864; Cichlasoma synspilum C. L. Hubbs, 1935; Vieja melanurus (Günther, 1862); Vieja synspila (C. L. Hubbs, 1935); Vieja synspilum (C. L. Hubbs, 1935); Cichlaurus hicklingi Fowler, 1956; Cichlasoma hicklingi (Fowler, 1956); Paraneetroplus synspilus (C. L. Hubbs, 1935)

= Vieja melanurus =

Species of fish

Vieja melanurus, the quetzal cichlid, redhead cichlid or firehead cichlid, is a species of cichlid that is native to the Lake Petén Itzá system, the Grijalva-Usumacinta River basin, and other Atlantic river drainages in southern Mexico, Belize, and Guatemala.

== Description ==
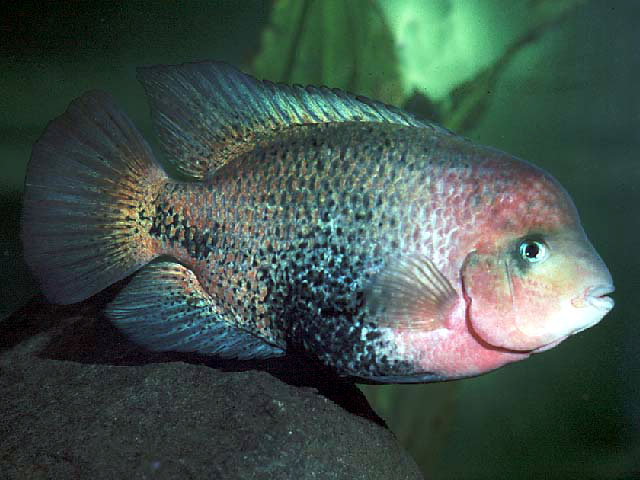
Male V. melanura Adult pair illustrating sexual dimorphism

V. melanura is a brightly colored cichlid popular in the aquarium trade. It can reach a total length of 35 cm (14 in), and is a sexually dimorphic species; males grow larger than females and develop a prominent nuchal hump on their forehead. Adults are quite colourful with an orange to pinkish-red head, a body often displaying green, blue, pink and golden-orange, and a horizontal black bar (often patchy or mottled) at the base of the tail. Relative to other cichlid species, they have shorter heads, longer digestive tracts, and larger bodies. They have a caudal (posterior) stripe extending at a slight downward slope from the peduncle (the rearmost part of the fish connecting the tail to the rest of the body) and covering about ⅓ of the body length. The belly and mottling elsewhere on the body can also be black. There are significant individual and geographical variations in the colors; partially, this is related to the clarity of the water at a location. Adults are always robust and high-bodied cichlids, but there are some regional variations depending on habitat.

The caudal stripe was used to distinguish V. melanura from the synonymous species, V. synspila, and several other species in the genera until it was realized the stripe angle varies greatly interspecifically. Researchers found that in each individual fish, the right-side stripe slopes downward at a much sharper angle than the left side and that larger individuals have steeper sloped stripes. The slope of the caudal stripe also varies across V. melanura’s area of distribution. Individuals from Belize have distinctly unique stripes; this is likely due to different habitat variables leading to a body morphology that differs from their Mexican and Guatemalan counterparts.

== Taxonomy ==
Like many genera in the Cichlid family, Vieja is taxonomically ill-defined. V. melanura and its sister species, V. synspila, were recognized for a number of years as two distinct species. However V. melanura lacks morphological or meristic differentiation from V. synspila. Previously, it was thought that the caudal stripe was perfectly horizontal in V. melanura and slightly angled downward in V. synspila until this trait was studied more closely and it was realized that V. melanura’s stripe also angles downward. Thus V. synspila is now recognized as a junior synonym of V. melanura, meaning they are the same species under two different names. Since V. melanura was established as the name of the species first, this article will continue to refer to the cichlid under this name.

Central American cichlids quickly diversified after invading the continent around 30 million years ago and there are currently 122 evolutionarily independent lineages currently occupying the waters of Central America. It was initially assumed this diversity arose from adaptive radiation after the event that brought cichlids to the South American continent. However, based on mitochondrial DNA markers, it is more likely that cichlid species like V. melanura radiated at a consistent rate. It is also likely that cichlids colonized Mesoamerica on at least two separate occasions based on phylogenetic and biogeographical evidence.

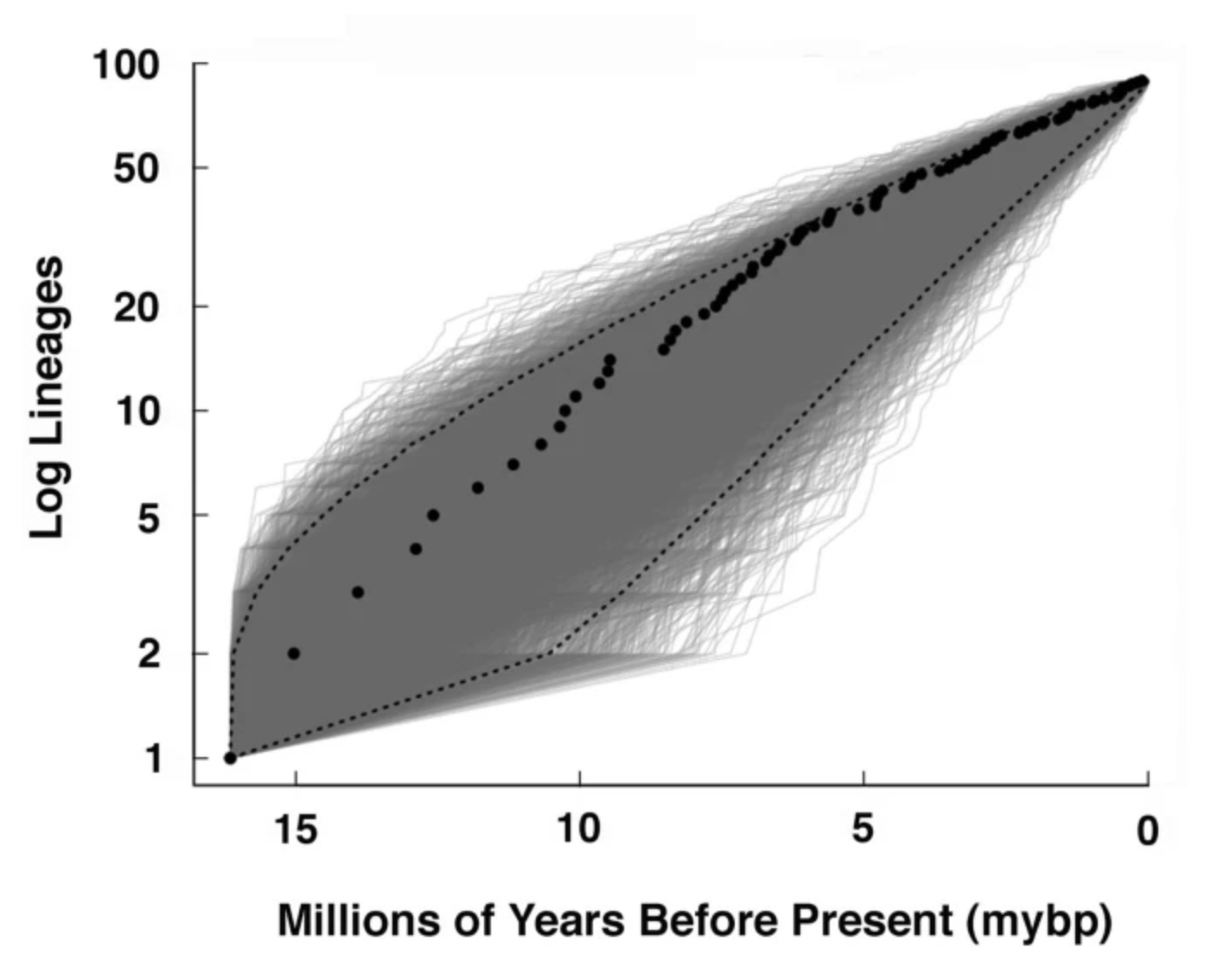
Plot showing the lineage-through-time (LTT) of CA Heroine diversification. The black dots show numbers of lineages at a given time frame using reconstructed phylogeny to estimate their positions. The grey lines represent simulated pure-birth phylogenies for comparison to the Central American lineages. The dotted lines show the 95% confidence interval of the number of lineages expected from the simulated pure-birth phylogenies.

Cichlids came to Mesoamerica via South America and have since become a prevalent family in the continent. Cichlids are speculated to have arrived in Central America in one of three ways: 1) a very old land connection which existed during the Cretaceous, 2) a land bridge between Columbia and the Greater Antilles in the late Eocene to early Oligocene, or 3) via the Panamanian isthmus.

Due to their swift diversification, Central American cichlids are difficult to define phylogenetically and there is no stable, definitive phylogeny for the family. Previously, all Central American Cichlids were classified under one genus, Cichlasoma and treated as a monophyletic group. However, recent studies on Mesoamerican cichlid phylogeny have made many changes to the family both on morphological and genetic grounds. Many genuses of the cichlid family are now considered polyphyletic (meaning that these groups did not evolve from a common ancestor) and recent evidence suggests that Vieja is no exception.

== Distribution ==
V. melanura is native to the Atlantic slope of central America, particularly in lowland areas such as the Petén lake district, Río Grijalva-Usumacinta system, and in adjacent water systems of México, Belize, Guatemala, and Costa Rica. It inhabits a wide variety of freshwater habitats, usually in slow-moving or standing waters such as rivers, lakes and lagoons. V. melanura is also tolerant to brackish environments. It has high rates of survival in up to 5ppt salinity environments but in higher salinity environments, survival rates begin to fall and by 20ppt the mortality rate is 100%. On average, larger individuals are able to better tolerate higher levels of salinity. This tolerance to brackish environments make V. melanura an invasion threat to non-native waters. Via the aquarium trade, it has been introduced to many water systems around the globe, including areas of the US and Asia. It has been found in the Kallang River at Bishan-Ang Mo Kio Park, Singapore, which was rehabilitated for urban use between 2009 and 2011. Since then it has spread both upstream and downstream into the surrounding waterways, dominating endemic species.

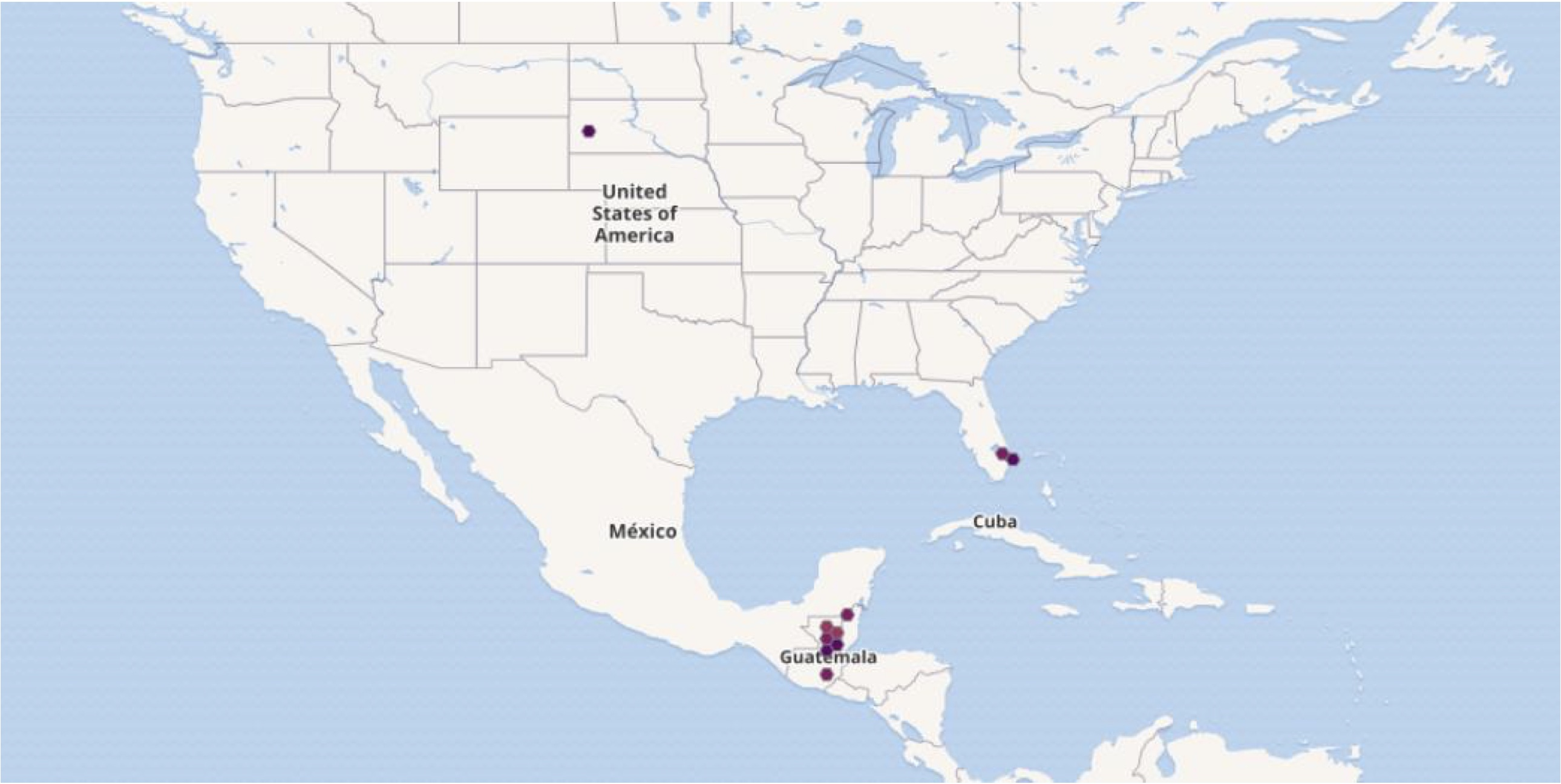
Map of V. melanura’s native distribution.

== Life history ==
=== Feeding ===
Adults primarily are classified as herbivores or detritivores and feed on detritus, plant matter, and aquatic macrophytes (aquatic plant matter large enough to be seen with the naked eye). They have a relatively narrower dietary niche compared to other cichlid species. Juveniles are planktivorous and feed on plankton during early development before developing a specialized detrivorous diet. This is a common feature in the juvenile stages of many other freshwater fish species; juveniles start out eating plankton before switching to more specialized food sources. The high protein diet helps the young fish to grow at a faster rate than it would on a specialized diet in addition to stimulating digestive enzymes that develop the alimentary tract.

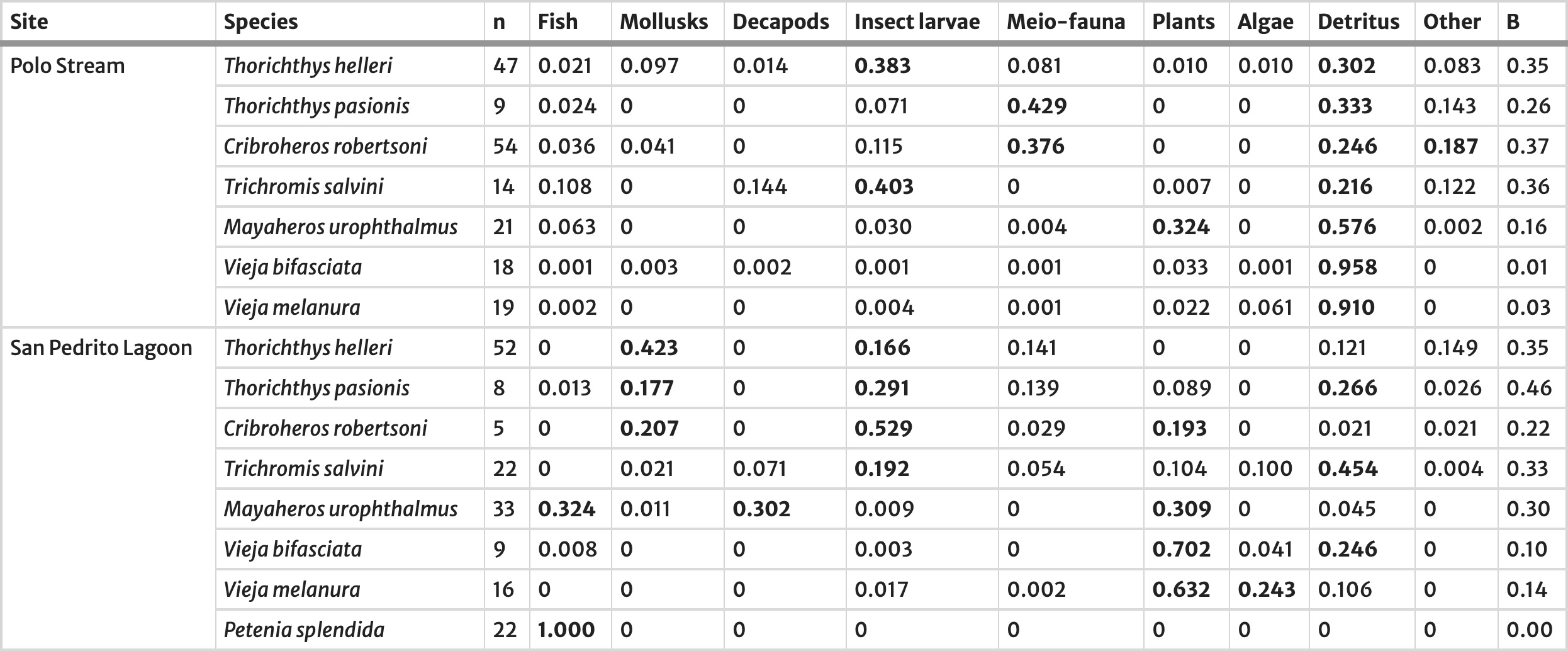
Table illustrating the average composition of V. melanura’s diet in comparison to other cichlids at the survey sites

=== Reproduction ===
The Redhead Cichlid is oviparous and highly fecund. Sexual maturity is reached at 10 cm and females can produce around 300-500 fry per spawning, laying up to 1000 eggs per year. Males and females form bonded pairs and work together to raise a brood. Before spawning, the pair will pick a site, usually a rock or a cave, and prepare it for their future brood. To prepare, the couple clean and clear the site of detritus. Once the site is clean, the couple spawn and eggs are laid. Within 2–3 days, the fry hatch and by 4 days, they are free swimming. The bonded pair exhibit parental tendencies toward their spawn but once they are ready to mate again, they will become aggressive toward the fry, driving them off the breeding ground.

== Conservation status ==
V. melanura is listed as “data-deficient” under the IUCN Red List Status.

== Aquaculture ==
V. melanura is popular in the aquarium trade, where it is often listed under the junior synonym V. synspila/synspilum. In captivity, individuals tend to be aggressive. A bonded pair will cohabitate largely without issue, however there is some risk of the male bullying the female. It may be possible to keep a community of Central American cichlids together in a single tank if enough territories are provided for all the fish.

V. melanura is not a picky eater and should be fed a diet primarily of standard cichlid pellet supplemented with meaty seafood such as prawns, mussels and fish. Spirulina or algae wafers should be given to the fish to provide vegetable matter.

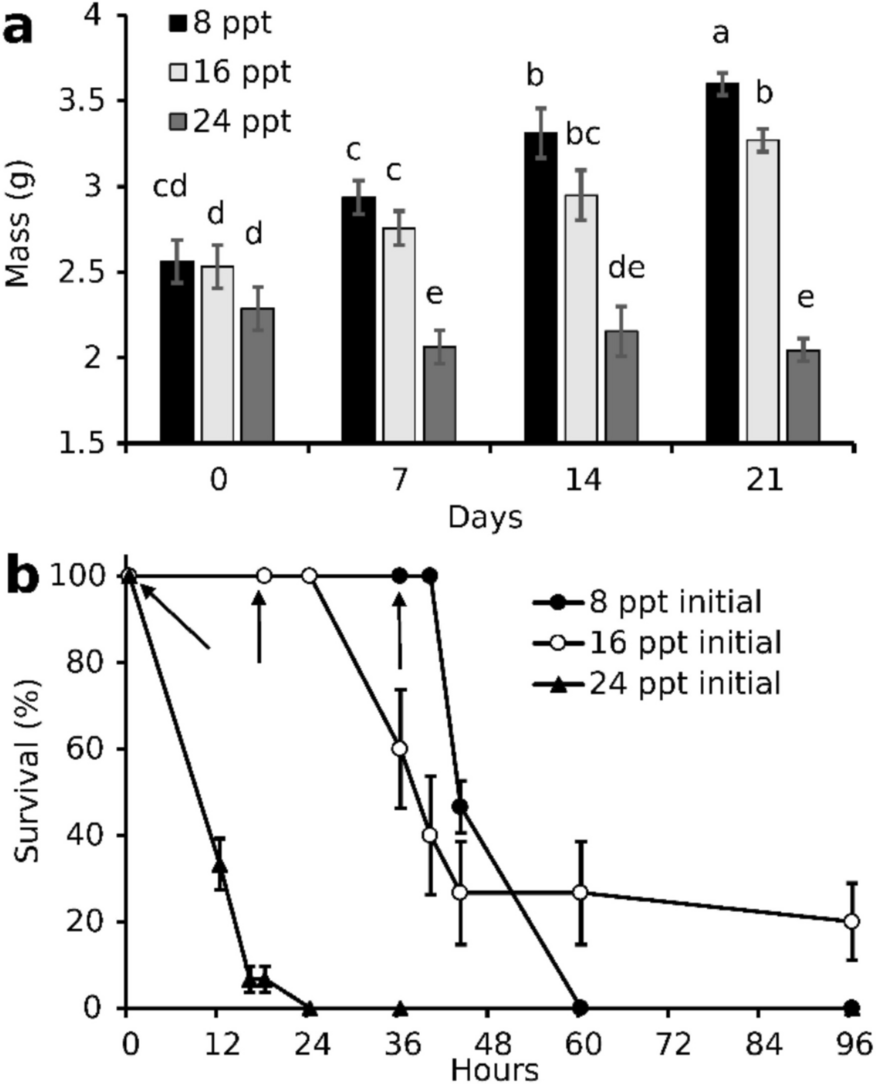
Figure illustrating the effect of extended exposure to salinity in juvenile blood parrot cichlids (V. melanura x A. citrinellus)

The Redheaded Cichlid has been used in creating hybrid cichlid species that have become popular in Asia in recent years. It is one of the species used in the creation of modern blood parrot cichlids and flowerhorn cichlids. The other parental species of the hybrid blood parrot cichlid is Amphilophus citrinellus, another popular ornamental cichlid widely used in aquaculture. Blood parrot cichlids have recently been found in a Malaysian rice agroecosystem, likely as the result of an aquarium dumping. Many self-sustaining populations of non-native cichlids now exist in various parts of Asia due to poor aquaculture practices. Records of cichlid populations outside their native habitat are common and illustrate the resiliency and adaptability of the family. Blood Parrot Cichlids however may pose less of an ecological threat compared to other cichlid species as there is no evidence they can perform natural fertilization. Couples undergo courtship rituals and prepare a mating site similar to their parent species, V. melanura, but no fertilization takes place. A study using in vitro fertilization to test this theory established that even in a lab setting the eggs were not able to be fertilized, suggesting that Blood Parrot Cichlid males may be sterile.

Furthermore, while the Redhead cichlid is known to be slightly salinity tolerant, the Blood Parrot Cichlid does not show the same level of tolerance to brackish environments. Chronic exposure to salinity leads to lower growth and survival rates in many Central American cichlids including the Blood Parrot Cichlid. Juveniles are especially susceptible to salinity. While Blood Parrot Cichlids certainly pose a threat to freshwater systems, even if adults were released into coastal or brackish areas, their offspring could not survive in the salty environment.
