= George Farmer (aquascaper) =

British aquascaper

George Farmer is a British aquascaping expert.

Farmer served as a Royal Air Force bomb disposal officer. After serving in Afghanistan, he suffered from PTSD and found that aquascaping helped him. He says that for him, "a well-aquascaped aquarium is the most therapeutic thing you can look at." He started aquascaping in 2002 and made it his career.

Farmer started a YouTube channel for aquascaping enthusiasts, which as of 2018 had 20,000 subscribers, rising to more than 200,000 as of 2026. He has been a columnist for the aquarium magazine Practical Fishkeeping for more than 10 years. In 2007 he co-founded the UK Aquatic Plants Society, which as of 2018 had 25,000 members.

== Bibliography ==
- Farmer, George (2020). Aquascaping. Skyhorse Publishing. ISBN 9781510753389.
