= Painted fish =

Artificially coloured aquarium fish

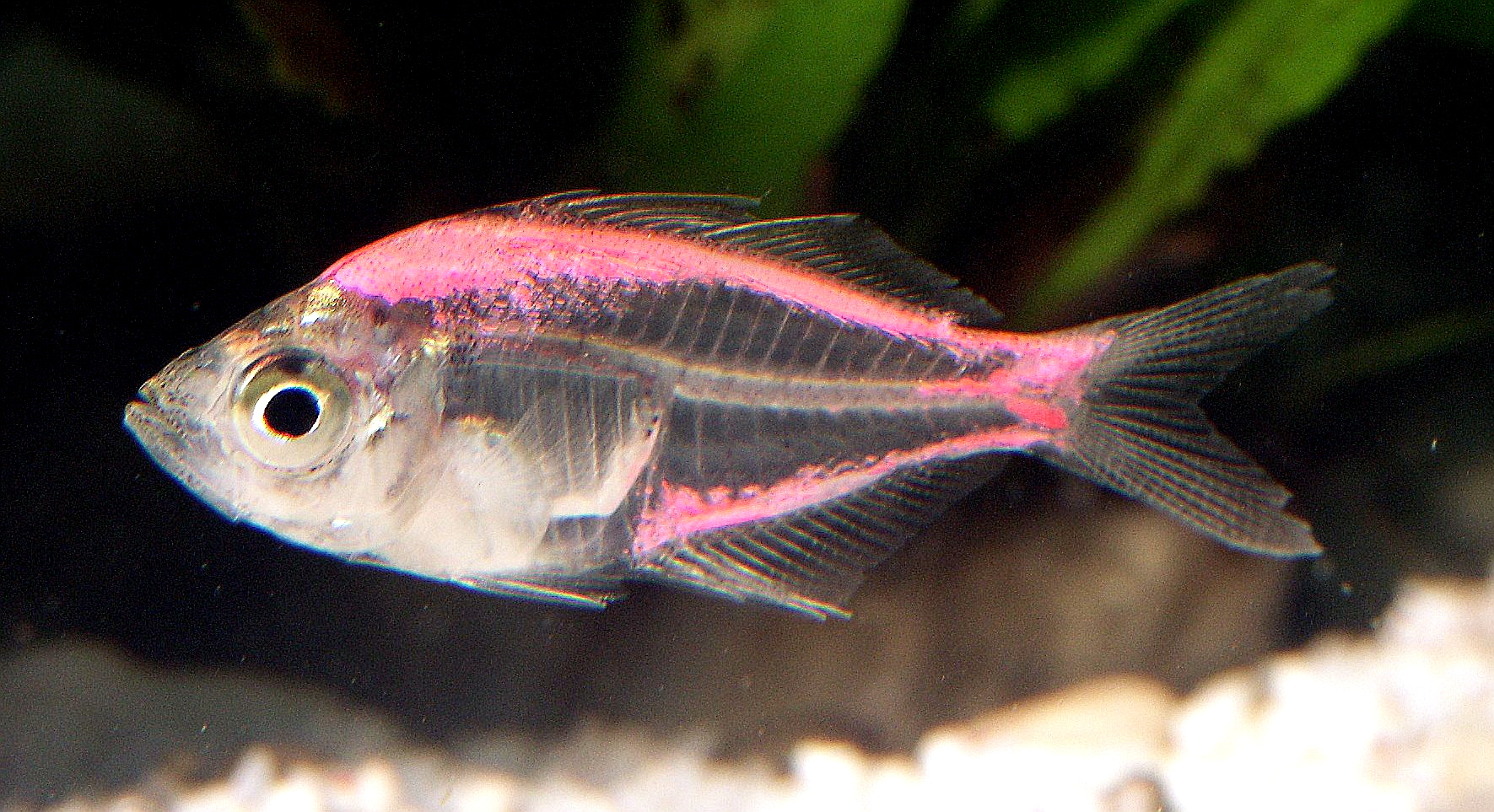
Painted Parambassis ranga specimen. A needle was used to inject the pink dye in this example.

Painted fish are ornamental aquarium fish which have been artificially coloured to appeal to consumers. This artificial colouring, also known as juicing, is achieved by a number of methods, such as injecting the fish with a hypodermic syringe containing bright fluorescent colour dye, dipping the fish into a dye solution, or feeding the fish dyed food.

This controversial process is usually done to make the fish a brighter colour and more attractive to consumers. The colouring of the fish is not permanent, and usually fades away in six to nine months. This practice is distinct from the creation of genetically modified fish, whose colouring is passed on genetically and is permanent.

== Methods ==
There are a number of methods for introducing artificial colour into fish.

=== Dyes ===
A common method of creating "painted fish" is through dye injection via syringe. Generally, fish are injected multiple times. Fish may also be dipped in a caustic solution to strip their outer slime coat, then dipped in dye. These methods are reported to have a very high mortality rate.

Many varieties of "colour-enhancing" foods for aquarium fishes are available to the consumer. Generally, these foods contain natural dyes, such as beta-carotene, and are not harmful to fish, although, as with other dye methods, the effect is temporary. One source reports that harmful dyes are sometimes used by wholesalers, however.

=== Lasers ===
Fish can also be tattooed using a low-intensity laser with a dye, a process that was developed by scientists for fisheries but is now applied to ornamental fish.

=== Hormones ===
Hormone administration can sometimes increase colouration, although it can also render female fish infertile.

=== Genetic modification ===
Introduction of genes for fluorescent pigments, derived from corals and jellyfish, results in permanent colouration that is also passed on to offspring, without the need to inject or physically modify the fish themselves.

Aquarium fish genetically modified to fluoresce in bright colours under white or ultraviolet light are now available commercially, under the trade name GloFish. The technology was originally developed to produce a fish capable of detecting environmental pollution. These zebrafish and tetras are available in several fluorescent colours, protected by a United States patent.

== Varieties ==
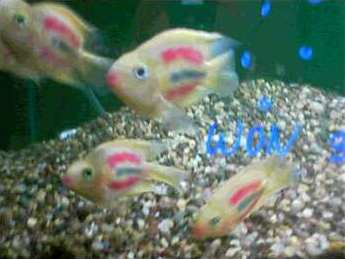
Painted blood parrot cichlids

Some species, such as albino Corydoras and "painted" glassfish, are injected with dye using a hypodermic needle. In more recent times (2004-2005), injection dyed albino Plecostomus and rift lake cichlids have also become available. Other than the Indian Glassy Fish, most dyed fish are albinos.

=== Some commonly painted species ===
- Indian glassy fish (Parambassis ranga). Tradename: Painted glassfish; Disco Fish; Colored Glass Tetra; Lightbulb tetra.
- Black tetra (Gymnocorymbus ternetzi). Tradenames: Berry Tetra; Painted Tetra.
- Oscar (Astronautus ocellatus). Tradenames: Blueberry Oscar; Strawberry Oscar.
- Corydoras species
- African Rift Lake cichlids, such as Pseudotropheus. Tradenames: Ice Blue Albino Cichlid; Zebra Ice Albino Cichlid.
- Suckermouth catfish (Hypostomus plecostomus). Tradenames: Patriotic Suckerfish; Mixed Color Suckerfish.
- Blood parrot cichlid (Amphiliphus citrinellus x Heros severus). Tradenames: Jellybean Cichlid; Cotton Candy Cichlid.
- Goldfish (Carassius auratus). Tradenames: Jellybeans; Icepops.

== Health hazards to painted fish ==
A 1998 survey carried out in the South of England revealed that over 40% of painted glassfish showed signs of a Lymphocystis infection, compared to 10% of unpainted glassfish. The infection may have been caused by transmitting the virus from fish to fish via an infected needle, or by a reduced resistance to the infection due to stress from the injection process. In addition, fishes injected with dye often die without apparent external disease symptoms, presumably due to kidney disease caused by injection.

== Efforts to stop fish-painting ==
Some members of the aquarium trade want to ban this practice. For example, the British publication Practical Fishkeeping started a campaign in 1996 to ask retailers to stop selling dyed fish, which led to a significant decrease in the number sold in the United Kingdom. Practical Fishkeeping has launched a similar campaign with a global scope and maintains a register of stores which do not stock dyed fish. The Royal Society for the Prevention of Cruelty to Animals (RSPCA) regards the practice as cruel and unnecessary cosmetic mutilation. A campaign in Australia and in the UK has limited the sale of these fish. Dyed fish are still available and are generally imported from Southeast Asia.

In February 2006, the UK's Department for Environment, Food and Rural Affairs (Defra) confirmed that it would not be making it illegal to sell dyed fish in the UK under the Animal Welfare Bill.

== Related Sites ==
- Painfully Painted Fish
