= Practical Fishkeeping =

United-Kingdom-based aquarium magazine

- Editor: Nathan Hill
- Former editors: Karen Youngs
- Staff writers: Steve Baker
- Photographer: Neil Hepworth/Nathan Hill
- Categories: Fishkeeping
- Frequency: 13 issues per year
- Publisher: Warners Publications Plc
- First issue: April 1966
- Country: United Kingdom
- Based in: Bourne
- Language: English
- Website: www.practicalfishkeeping.co.uk

Practical Fishkeeping (also known as PFK) is a United Kingdom-based aquarium magazine. It is published every four weeks by Warners Publications Plc. The title covers the entire aquatic market from tropical freshwater and tropical marine fishkeeping throughout the year to small amounts of pond and coldwater fish coverage during the summer months.

== History and profile ==
Originally called Pet Fish Monthly, the title launched in April 1966. The title changed its name to Practical Fishkeeping in 1981. The magazine is edited by Nathan Hill, who took on the role as of January 2018. Regular contributing authors include, Nathan Hill, Julian Dignall, Ad Konings, Max Pedley, Ivan Mikolji, Keith Naitby, Chris Sergeant, Tim Smith, Heiko Bleher, Gabor Horvath, Steve Baker, Tristan Lougher, Dave Wolfenden, Bob Mehen and George Farmer. Former editors of the title include Steve Windsor, Nick Fletcher, Karen Youngs, Matt Clarke, Jeremy Gay and Angela Kenny. The headquarters is in Bourne, Lincolnshire. Practical Fishkeeping also has a very successful website, regularly covering fish related news. Until 2018 it also hosted a popular web forum with over 190,000 members. The Forum expanded even further on the printed magazine and the online articles that were found on the main site.
