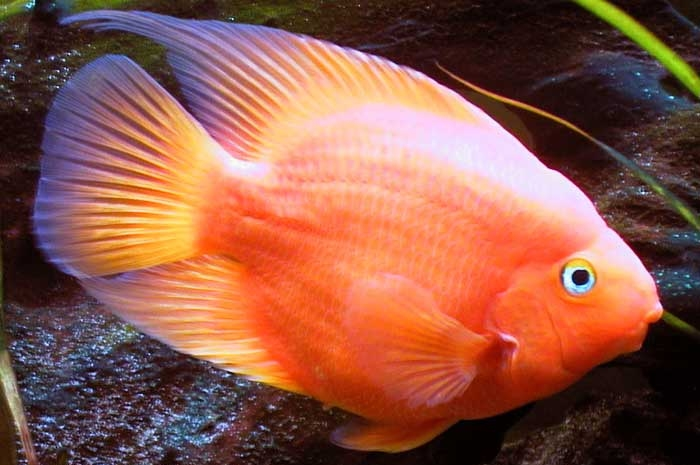

Scientific classification
- Kingdom: Animalia
- Phylum: Chordata
- Class: Actinopterygii
- Order: Cichliformes
- Family: Cichlidae
- Subfamily: Cichlinae
- Tribe: Heroini
- Hybrid: Amphilophus citrinellus × Vieja melanurus

= Blood parrot cichlid =

Hybrid fish, first bred in around 1986

The Blood Parrot Cichlid (Amphilophus citrinellus × Vieja melanurus), or parrot cichlid, is a hybrid species of fish in the family Cichlidae. The fish was first bred in Taiwan around 1986. Blood parrots should not be confused with other parrot cichlids or salt water parrotfish (family Scaridae). Natural colors of the fish are red, yellow, and grey: other colors are injected by breeders.

Because this hybrid cichlid has various anatomical deformities, controversy exists over the ethics of creating the blood parrot. One deformity is its mouth, which has only a narrow vertical opening. This makes blood parrots somewhat harder to feed and potentially vulnerable to malnutrition.

The fish is known to be semi-aggressive. Despite its deformity, it can hold its own in a fight, and will prey on any small fish that can fit in its mouth.

== Description ==
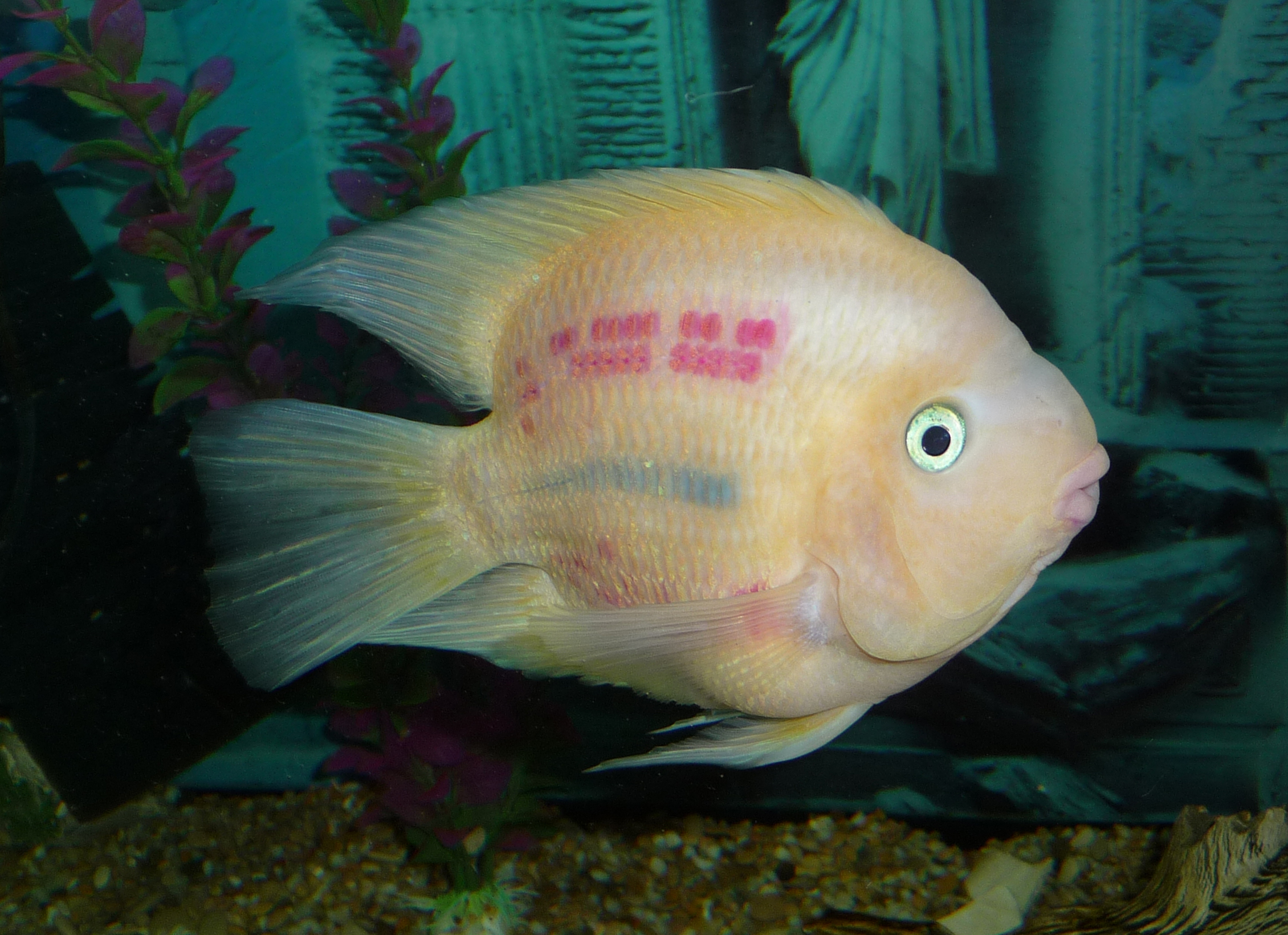
Dyed fish such as this one are subject to worse health

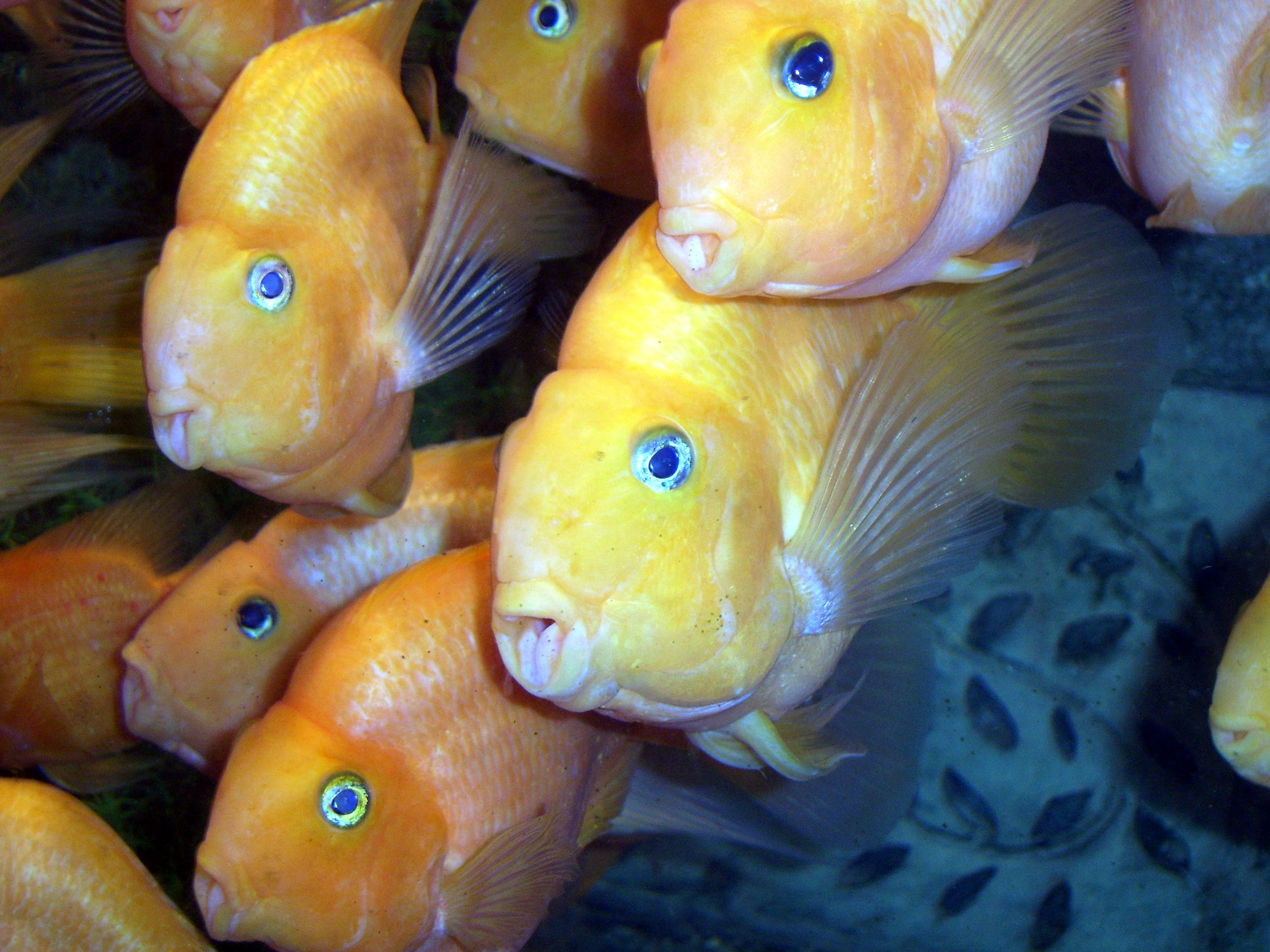
The mouth cannot fully close

Blood parrots are often bright orange in coloration, but there are other colors that they can have from selective breeding, such as red, yellow or gray. Other colors may be produced by dyeing the fish, which can shorten life expectancy. Some fish have been injected with a colored dye by the breeder. Another modification, generally considered inhumane by enthusiasts, involves cutting the tail while small which causes the fish to grow into a heart shape; these are usually sold under the name of "heart parrots". As the press has brought this practice to light, the majority of fish stockists will no longer sell these modified fish. Adult fish can grow to a length of 8 inches (20 centimeters) and reach an age of 10 to 15 years.

Various breeds of blood parrots have been developed, such as the "King Kong parrot", which typically vary in color from red to yellow. They have fully functioning mouths with less of a nuchal deformity and grow larger. They are usually considered more valuable than the traditional blood parrots.

== Genetic defects ==
As a result of hybridization of the parent species, the fish have several anatomical deformities, including a beak-shaped mouth that cannot fully close, which they compensate for by crushing food with the throat muscles, a deformed nuchal hump, and compressed vertebrae. Some commercial foods have been developed specifically to be easy for blood parrots to ingest, and recently some blood parrots have been selectively bred to be able to completely close their mouths. Blood parrots sometimes can have deformed swim bladders, causing an awkward swimming pattern; and unusually large, and often deformed irises.

== Breeding ==
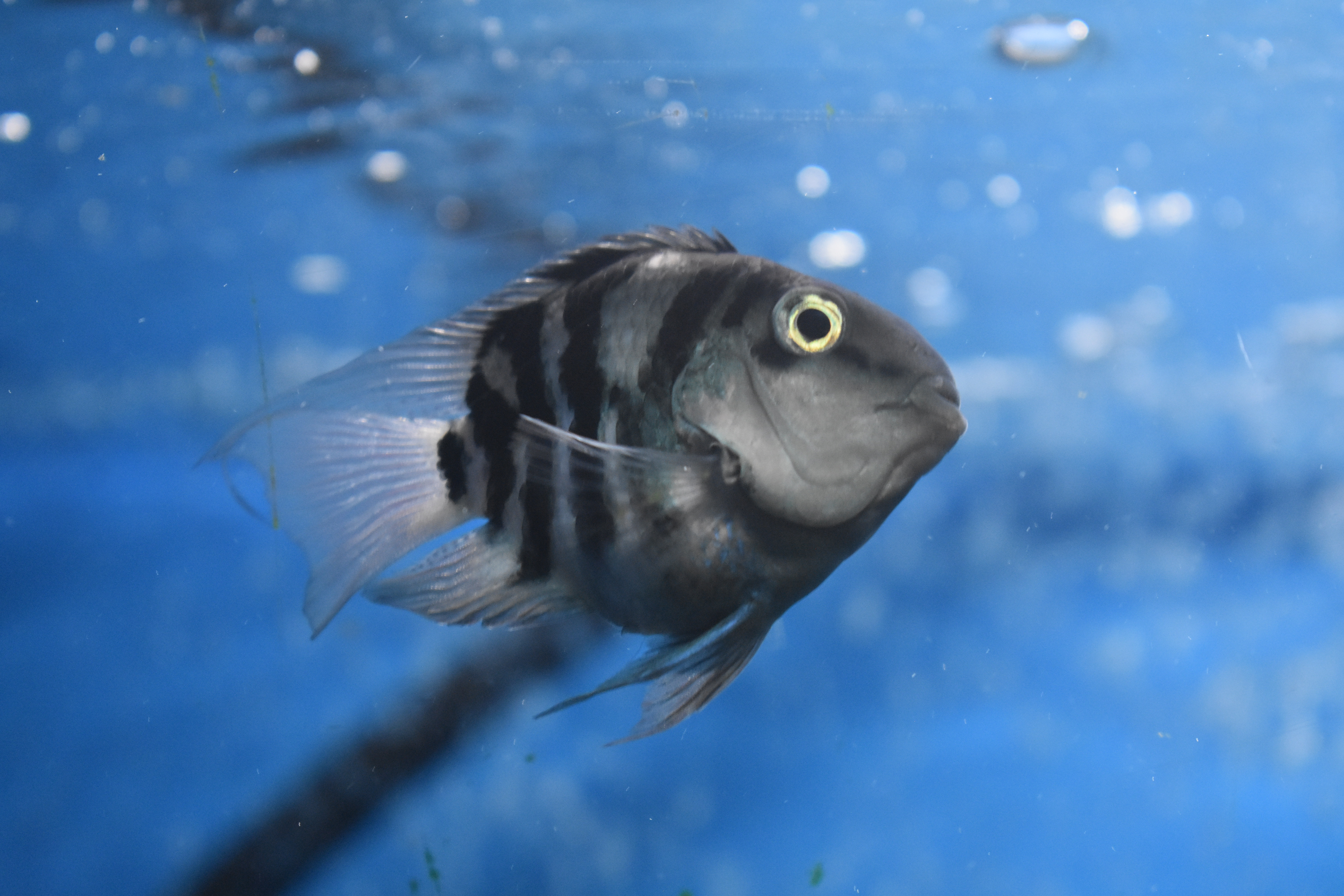
Blood parrot cichlids are sometimes further crossed with other species, such as a convict cichlid in this case.

Male blood parrots generally are infertile, but successful breeding has occurred. Normally, a female blood parrot lays eggs on a hard surface, and both parents guard the eggs unless the brood develops fungus, at which time the eggs will be consumed by either the parents or other fish. However, fish farms have begun introducing male blood parrots injected with a hormone to increase fertility. Most female blood parrots are fertile.

== Aquarium ==
Blood parrots are hardy and may be housed singly, in schools, or with complementary species under a variety of conditions. Sufficient lighting can be provided by a variety of compact fluorescent lamps without the use of T5 or halide fixtures. The fish are voracious eaters and generate significant uneaten debris during feeding. High volume filtration and frequent substrate suctioning is recommended to minimize nitrates.

The recommended aquarium size is 55 gallons for one, and for every extra add 20 gallons.
