= Spawning trigger =

Environmental cues that cause marine animals to breed

Spawning triggers are environmental cues that cause aquatic animals to breed. Most commonly they involve sudden changes in the environment, such as changes in temperature, salinity, and/or the abundance of food. Catfish of the genus Corydoras, for example, spawn immediately after heavy rain, the specific cues being an increase in water level and a decrease in temperature. When water levels rise, it allows many fish access to areas further upstream, that are better suited for reproduction, that were not previously accessible. This can be a dangerous strategy, as if they wait too long, they may get trapped in small pockets of water, and die when the levels recede. Discus will breed when the temperature goes up and there is an overabundance of food such as mosquito larvae. Many fish stock up on energy reserves to ensure they make it through this exhausting period that is very hard on their bodies, while others go without eating during the spawning process because they are so focused on their offspring.

Spawning triggers allow many fish to synchronize their breeding, making it more probable that individual fish will find a mate. In most cases, if these triggers were not present, male and female fish would not meet at the right stage and the number of offspring would be reduced. However, many fish do not respond to specific spawning triggers and will breed either constantly (e.g., guppies); at specific times of the year (e.g., grunion); or only at a certain point in their life cycle (e.g., eels). Some fish, like salmon, spend almost their whole life maturing in the ocean, then swim many miles up their ancestral rivers, to lay their eggs, commonly dying after spawning. Though most commonly associated with fish, spawning triggers also occur in bivalves and corals.

In certain cases, aquarists can trigger spawning by duplicating the natural conditions where fish would breed. This can be done at times of the year that is not the same as typical breeding, indoors, fish can be artificially inseminated, etc. All of this is done by mimicking what conditions these fish go through, in the wild, to prepare and partake in the breeding/spawning process. As stated above, these conditions may include rainfall, water level, an abundance of food, and/or salinity of the water.
