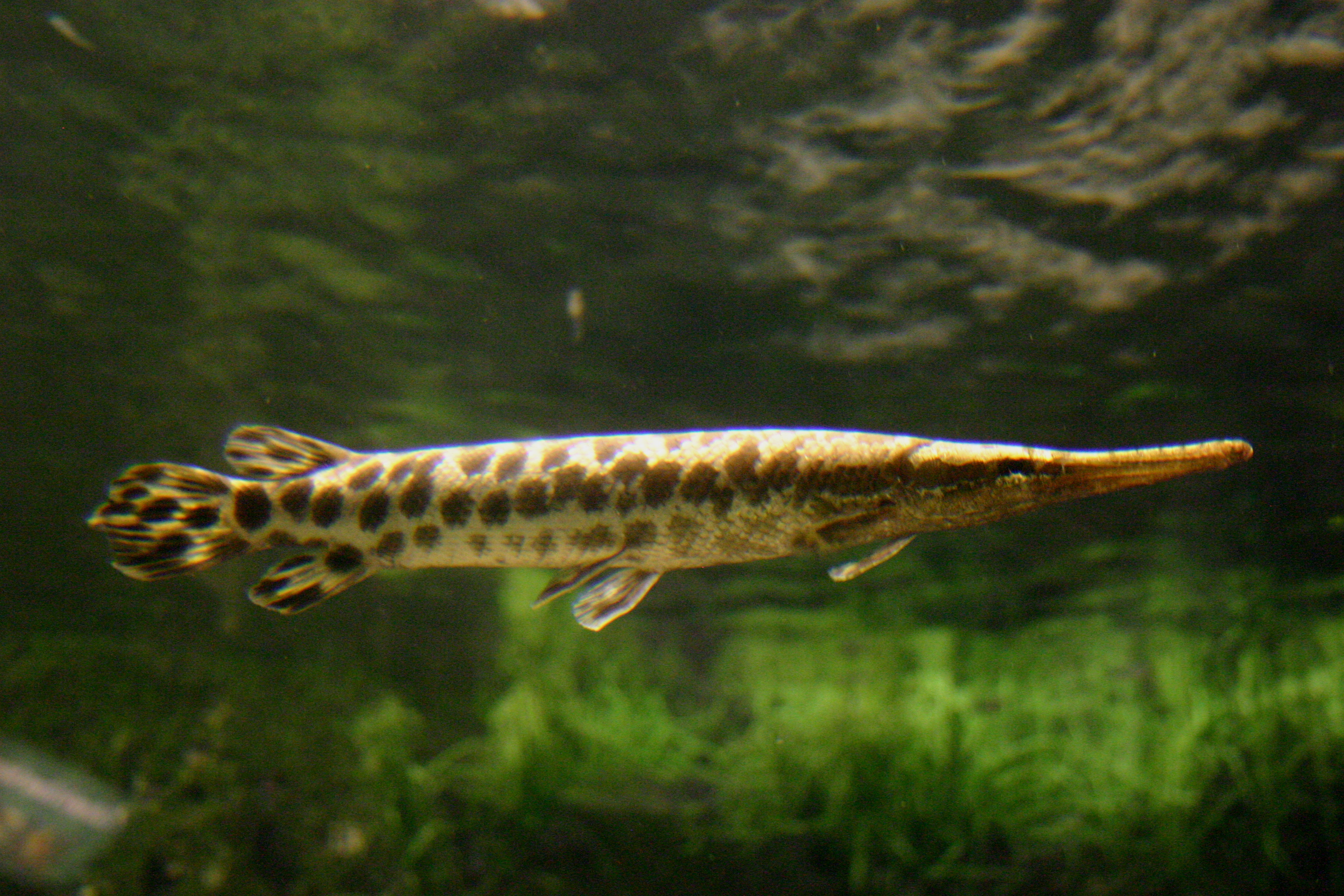
- Spotted gar (Lepisosteus oculatus)

Conservation status
- Least Concern (IUCN 3.1)

Scientific classification
- Kingdom: Animalia
- Phylum: Chordata
- Class: Actinopterygii
- Clade: Ginglymodi
- Order: Lepisosteiformes
- Family: Lepisosteidae
- Genus: Lepisosteus
- Species: L. oculatus

Binomial name
- Lepisosteus oculatus Winchell, 1864
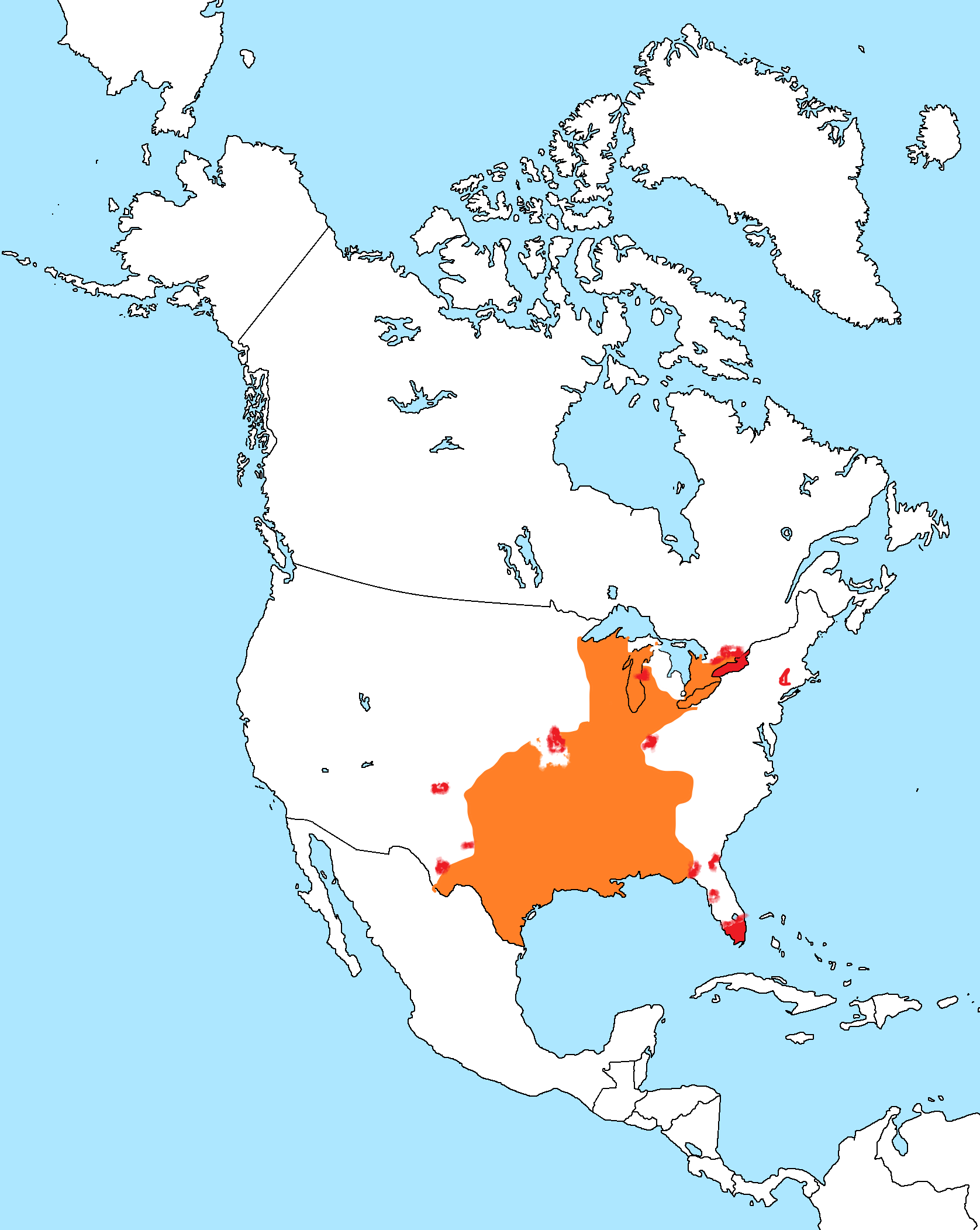

Synonyms
- ?Lepisosteus latirostris Girard, 1858; Cylindostreus productus Cope, 1865; Lepisosteus productus (Cope, 1865); Cylindrosteus agassizii Duméril, 1870; Cylindrosteus bartonii Duméril, 1870; Cylindrosteus zadockii Duméril, 1870

= Spotted gar =

Species of fish

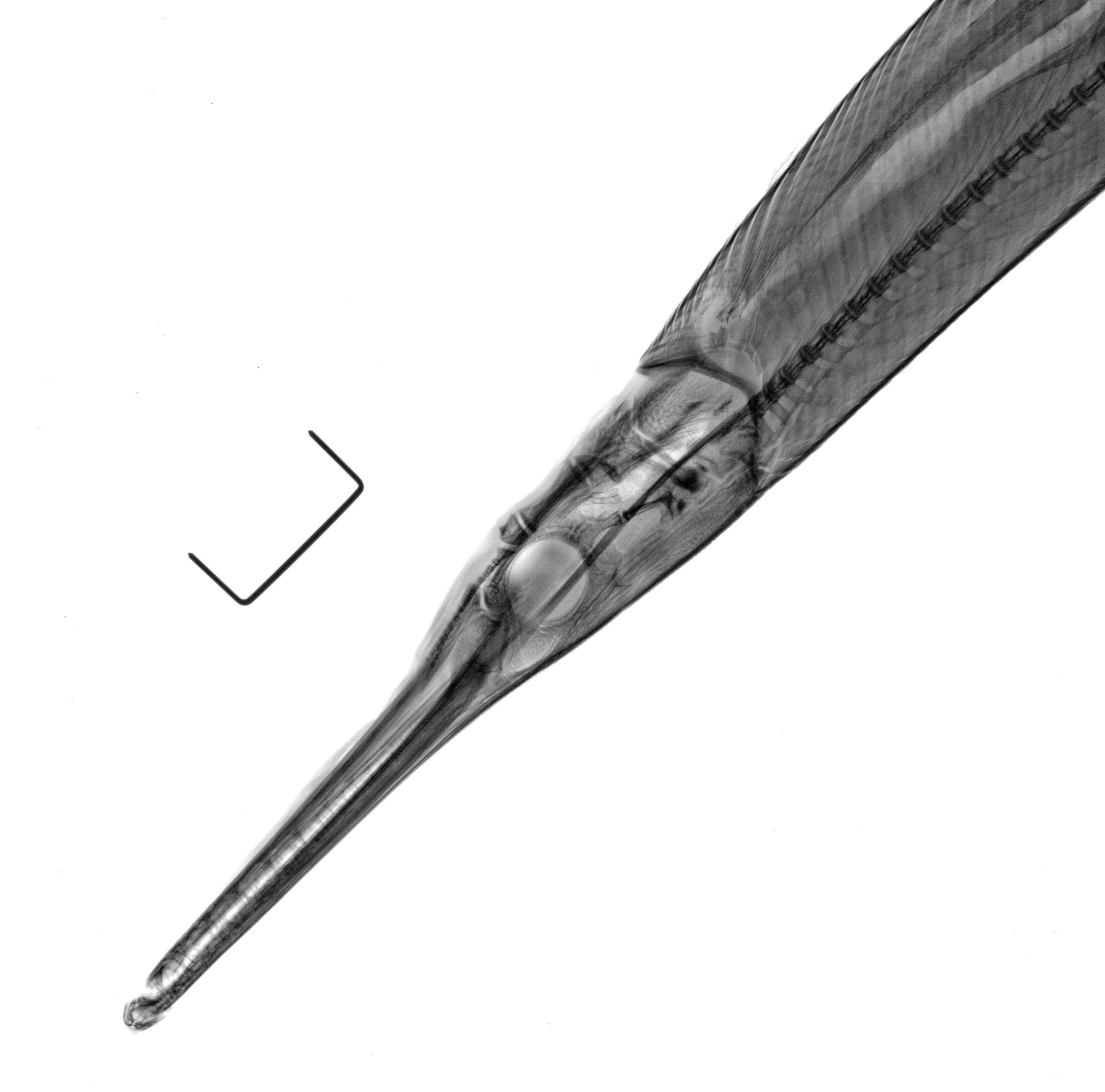
Gar head X-ray image

The spotted gar (Lepisosteus oculatus) is a freshwater fish native to North America that has an abundance of dark spots on its head, fins, and dart-like body. Spotted gar have an elongated mouth with many needle-like teeth to catch other fish and crustaceans. It is one of the smallest of the seven species of gar found in North America, growing 2–3 ft (0.61–0.91 m) in length and weighing 4–6 lb (1.8–2.7 kg) typically. Gars have diamond-shaped, thick, enamel (ganoid) scales. The name Lepisosteus is Greek for "bony scale".

Gars are almost never eaten in the central and northern United States. They have high levels of mercury and are considered a cancer risk.

== Distribution and habitat ==
The spotted gar is native to North America and its current range is from southern Ontario to the west from the Devils River in Texas east to the northern coast of the Gulf of Mexico and southeast to the lower Apalachicola River in Florida. The gar population is small in the north and is being threatened in Lake Erie by the destruction of their habitat and pollution. The gar is more common in the southern waters like the Mississippi River basin from southern Minnesota to Alabama and western Florida. Historical records indicate the spotted gar resided in the Thames and Sydenham Rivers in Ontario, Canada. Also, the fish was once common in Illinois in the Green and Illinois Rivers to the swamps in Union County; though sporadic, the population has dwindled in these water systems because of the loss of specific habitat they need to live, clear pools with aquatic vegetation.

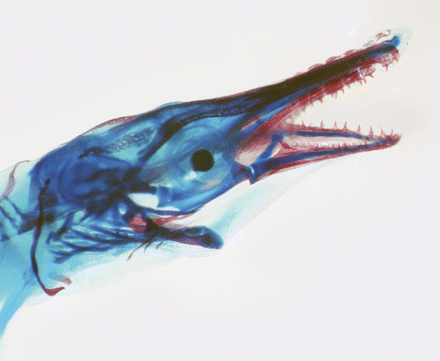
Gar larva at 22 days, stained for cartilage (blue) and bone (red)

Habitats for spotted gar are clear, slow-moving, shallow waters of creeks, rivers, and lakes. It occasionally enters brackish or more salty waters. In response to the low oxygen levels created by slow-moving water, the gars have developed the ability to gulp air and send it to a primitive lung called a gas bladder.

In one study, most spotted gar were shoreline oriented, preferred submerged branches as cover, and avoided areas of exposed bank. During a flood pulse, a floodplain provides habitat for spawning and nursery habitat for gar eggs.

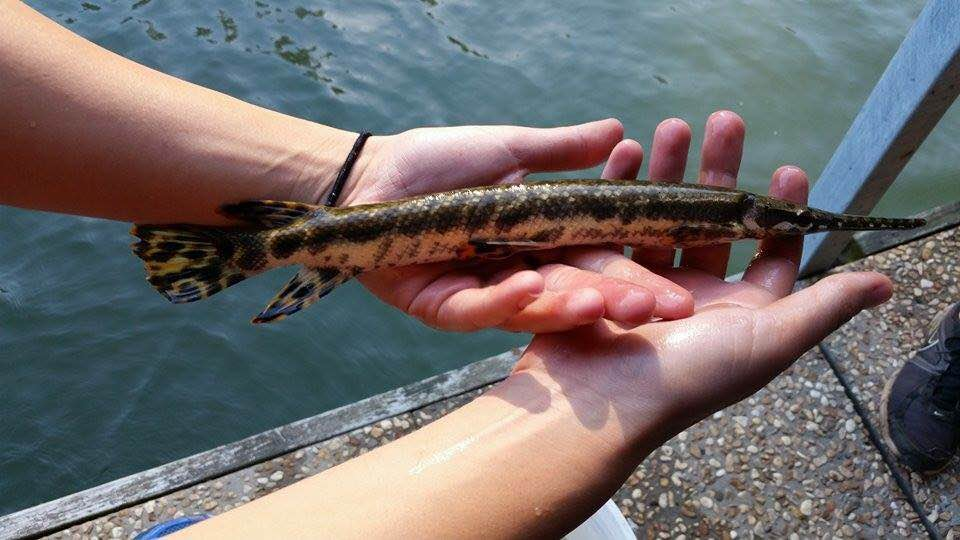
A specimen caught in Kentucky Lake by ecology students from Murray State University

== Ecology ==
The spotted gar is a voracious predator. Its sharp-toothed beak is very effective at catching fast moving prey. A diet study of the spotted gar reported the diet of a spotted gar consists of four species of fish; golden topminnow, warmouth, bluegill, and spotted sunfish, which adds to 18.1% of total food volume in the stomach, while 57.5% of the stomach content was shrimp. Other invertebrates filled the remaining 23.6% of the stomach. Gar are also known to eat insect larvae and algae.

Gar are a main predator in the aquatic food chain in lakes and rivers. In one example of a food chain herbivorous fish eat algae and are eaten by gar. Another food chain example is herbivorous invertebrates eat algae, are eaten by carnivorous fish, then the fish is eaten by the gar. Gar do not have many predators, only carnivorous fish would eat them, mainly at an early life stage. The fish would compete with other carnivorous fish such as the bowfin (Amia calva).

Movement rates were higher during the summer than during the fall and winter, and rates were greater at night than at dawn during both seasons. The temperature greatly affects their moving rates and their ability to range their home turf. When the water is warmer during the spring and summer, they travel more often than during the cold seasons. Spotted gars eat 70% of their food intake at night compared to dusk and dawn.

Abiotic factors that affect the spotted gar by humans include destruction of habitat and increased sedimentation in the water. In 2002, the Louisiana Department of Environmental Quality, Office of Water Resources, in coordination with the US Environmental Protection Agency, took fish tissue samples in the Lower Mississippi River to test for heavy metals and organic compounds. Spotted gar was found to be a cancer risk with high concentrations of heavy metals and organic compounds.

== Life history ==
Spotted gar spawn in the spring in April, May, and June, or when the water temperature is between 21.0 and 26.0 °C (69.8 and 78.8 °F), depending on the location. Gar spawn in shallow water with abundant vegetation and cover. A female can have multiple mating partners and the female is usually larger than the male.

The female can lay up to about 20,000 eggs, but on average about 13,000 eggs are laid. They lay their eggs on leaves of aquatic plants. The eggs are green in color and have an adhesive coating to keep them attached to aquatic vegetation. They are highly toxic to prospective predators. After 10 to 14 days, the eggs hatch. At this stage, the gar are most vulnerable.

Males mature at the age of two or three, whereas females mature at three or four years old. The male's average lifespan is 8 years and the female's average lifespan is 10 years. Females have lower annual mortality rates. The maximum lifespan for a gar is around 18 years; however, Teri the spotted gar, of undetermined sex, lived at the Museum of Natural Sciences of the University of Saskatchewan for over 20 years.

== Current management ==
Today, humans are affecting this fish species by destroying habitat and aquatic vegetation, and creating sedimentation in the waters of North America. Waste and chemical drainage into lakes and rivers causes chemical buildup and contamination of the water. Consequently, the water becomes murkier and causes predatory fish to have high mercury levels or accumulate carcinogenic compounds into their bodies. Spotted gar desire clear pools of water, and anthropogenic factors can decrease their survivability. This species is not on the U.S. Fish and Wildlife Service federally endangered species list, although in some northern states it is on special concern lists. In Canada, the fish is designated as threatened by the Committee on the Status of endangered wildlife in Canada. For Canadian waters the spotted gar is protected by the Species at Risk Act and the federal Fisheries Act. The Habitat Stewardship Program for Species at Risk works to protect the spotted gar and its habitat. Current management plans for spotted gar include: increasing water quality, minimizing or avoiding pollution, analyzing contaminated samples. The most important biological decline of the species is habitat destruction.
