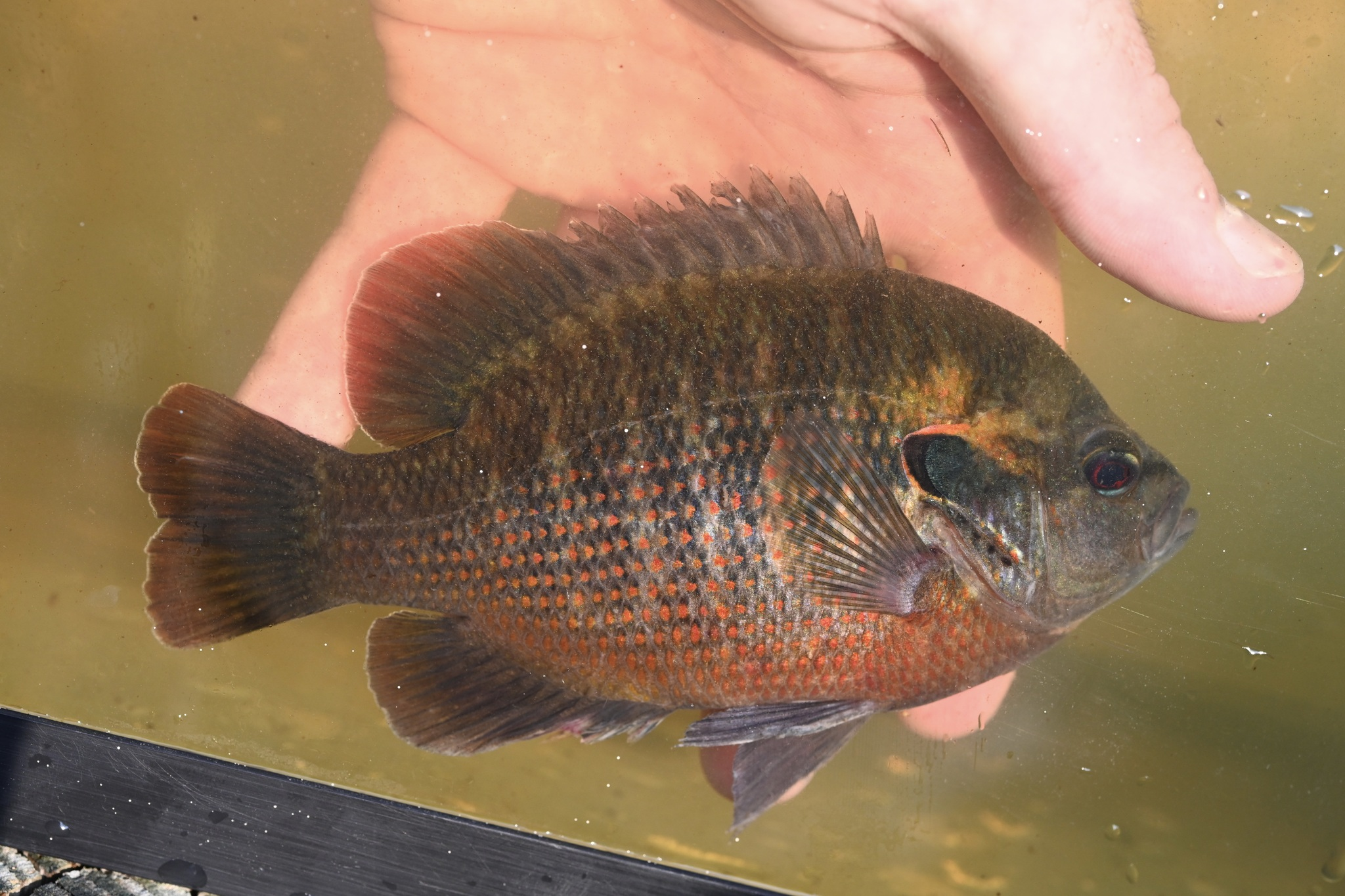

Conservation status
- Least Concern (IUCN 3.1)

Scientific classification
- Kingdom: Animalia
- Phylum: Chordata
- Class: Actinopterygii
- Order: Centrarchiformes
- Family: Centrarchidae
- Genus: Lepomis
- Species: L. miniatus

Binomial name
- Lepomis miniatus (D. S. Jordan, 1877)

Synonyms
- Lepiopomus miniatus D.S Jordan, 1877

= Redspotted sunfish =

Species of fish

The redspotted sunfish (Lepomis miniatus), also known as a stumpknocker, is a species of freshwater ray-finned fish, a sunfish from the family Centrarchidae which is native to the United States. The redspotted sunfish was previously considered to be a western subspecies of spotted sunfish (Lepomis punctatus) but was distinguished as a separate species by Warren in 1992.

== Geographic distribution ==
The redspotted sunfish is a freshwater fish that can be found throughout the Mississippi River Valley. The distribution spreads north into Illinois and to the Ohio River, west into Texas and to Oklahoma's Red River, and east to the Chattahoochee River in Georgia. Currently the populations of Lepomis miniatus found in the southern United States seem to be stable. However, the species's numbers have diminished significantly in the state of Illinois which lies at the northernmost point of the fish's historic range. Once, the redspotted sunfish was found in bodies of water throughout the state but the species's range, as of 2004, had diminished to just a few counties in the central and southern portions of Illinois. Surveys conducted in the mid-2000s suggested that just two populations existed in the entire state at the time, one in a tributary of the Illinois River and the other in a tributary of the Ohio River. There could be a number of causes for the decrease in the Lepomis miniatus in Illinois. A popular theory is that the redspotted sunfish has struggled due to a loss of wetlands, which make up the sunfish's natural habitat. The population may also be declining due to increasingly poor water conditions or from competition with invasive species.

== Description ==
The redspotted sunfish grows to a maximum standard length of 160 millimetres (6.3 in). An iridescent crescent is visible within its eye underneath the red or dark-colored iris. There is no dark spot at the rear of the dorsal fin, unlike that of the green sunfish, which also has a larger mouth than the redspotted sunfish does. Breeding redspotted males will develop red-orange coloration starting from their belly and extending upward as pigmented, horizontal rows of scales to within one or two rows below the lateral line, a feature that distinguishes them from paler-colored breeding males of the spotted sunfish Lepomis punctatus. Additionally, the redspotted sunfish does not have dark spots at the base of its scales, unlike spotted sunfish, in which these spots form irregular horizontal rows along the body. The redspotted sunfish has narrow bands of white or cream color at the tips of its dorsal, anal and caudal fins. It also has a dark opercular flap. In its zone of introgression with the spotted sunfish Lepomis punctatus, which includes areas of the Florida panhandle and western Georgia within its portion of the Tennessee River watershed and in tributaries of the Coosa River, part of the Mobile basin, L. miniatus may not be distinguishable from its sister species.

== Ecology ==
Lepomis miniatus feeds primarily on benthic species. Zooplankton make up between 33.3% to 74.6% of the diet of small sunfishes, about 50% of the diet of medium-sized sunfishes as they introduce larger prey into their diet. At larger sizes the redspotted sunfish shifts primarily to benthic macrofauna. Many larger carnivorous fish feed on the redspotted sunfish, primarily bass. Lepomis miniatus is commonly found in shallow and highly vegetated water. The species seems to prefer areas of slow moving water, 0.4 cm/s. The redspotted sunfish is salt tolerant and can be found in the lower reaches of estuaries, such as bayous, along the Gulf Coast west of Florida. While the redspotted sunfish has been shown to compete with other sunfish and some invasive species, like the Rio Grande cichlid in Louisiana, this competition is thought to have little effect in most cases due to the generalist diet of Lepomis miniatus. A more direct danger could be invasive species that force Lepomis miniatus out of its preferred habitat, increasing the risk of predation.

== Life history ==
The breeding time of the redspotted sunfish varies across the range of the species but usually occurs in late spring or early summer. The fish breeds in shallow, shaded, areas close to the shore in nests constructed by the males. The redspotted sunfish has an average clutch size of around 2000. Lepomis miniatus reaches sexual maturity at lengths greater than 50–55 mm TL, which occurs sometime between the ages of one and two. The average lifespan of the Lepomis miniatus is about five to six years, six being the maximum age the species tends to reach. The effect of human-induced changes on this life history is unknown at this time.

== Conservation and management ==
Reduction in the redspotted sunfish's native distribution area is probably the result of drainage of swamps and bottomland lakes and the general deterioration of the water quality. Oil pollution has been cited as a possible factor contributing to population decline in the lower Wabash River in Illinois. There is also some concern that the release of the invasive Nile tilapia into waters inhabited by the redspotted sunfish could be detrimental to the species.

The redspotted sunfish was listed as endangered by the State of Illinois in 2008. Fortunately a number of organizations have been working to help the species recover, and thanks to their efforts, the redspotted sunfish's conservation status in Illinois returned to "threatened" in 2020. The main groups who are working to rehabilitate Lepomis miniatus in Illinois are the Nature Conservancy in conjunction with the Illinois Natural History Survey and the Illinois Department of Natural Resources. These conservation efforts have involved transplanting a portion of the redspotted sunfish population into two protected, suitable, bodies of water. The first being a preserve lake in Emiquon National Wildlife Refuge near Havana, Illinois and the second being a refuge pond in Allerton Park in the Sangamon River basin. These populations have spawned enough fish to stock five more suitable bodies of water.
