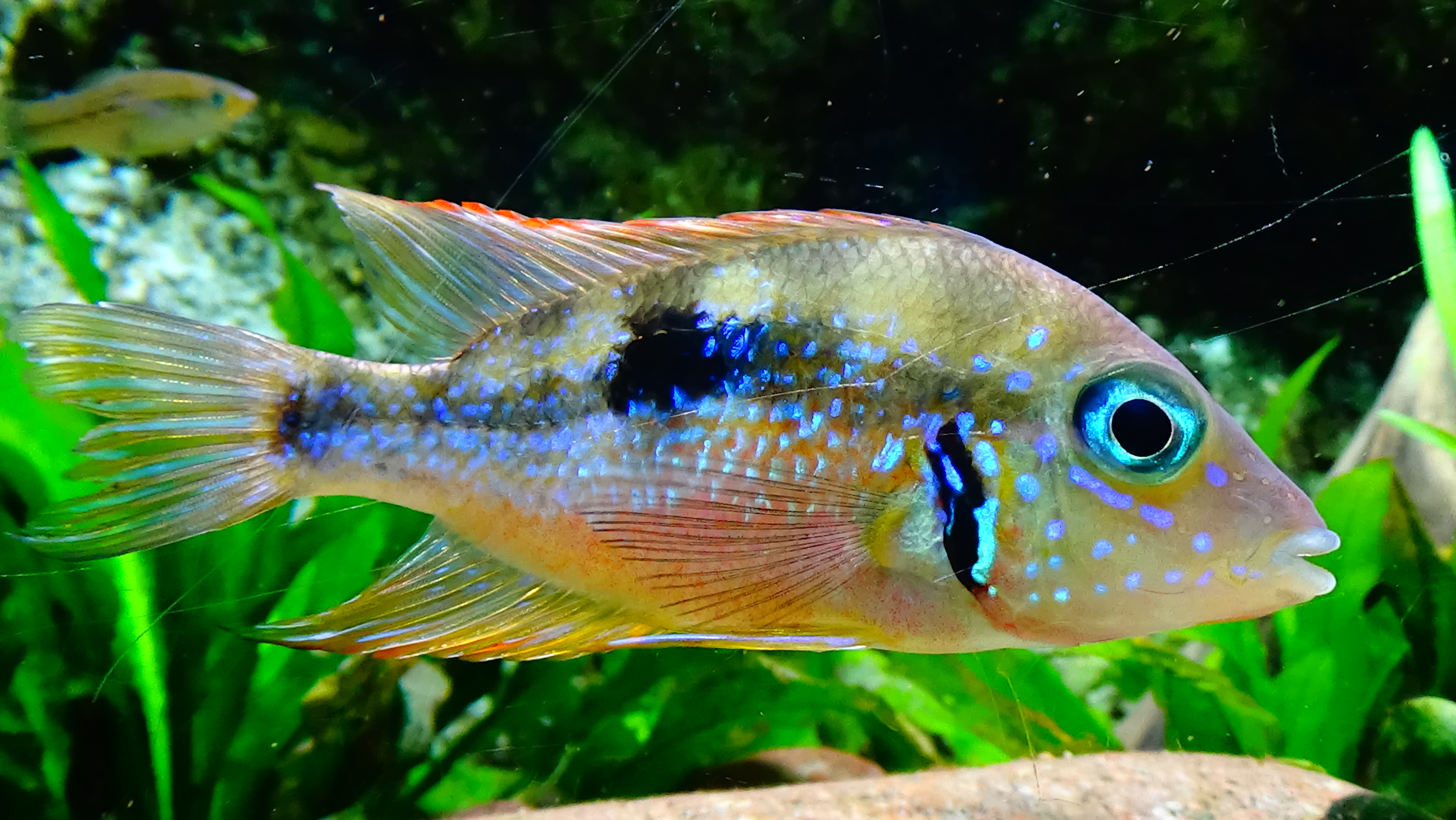
- Thorichthys aureus

Scientific classification
- Kingdom: Animalia
- Phylum: Chordata
- Class: Actinopterygii
- Order: Cichliformes
- Family: Cichlidae
- Tribe: Heroini
- Genus: Thorichthys; Meek, 1904

Type species
- Thorichthys ellioti Meek, 1904

= Thorichthys =

Genus of fishes

Thorichthys is a genus of cichlid fish that is native to the Atlantic slope of Middle America, ranging from southern Veracruz and the Yucatán Peninsula in Mexico, to Guatemala and Honduras, with introduced populations in a few other countries. They tend to inhabit moderately-flowing to standing water such as rivers, streams, lakes, ditches and lagoons, and they are primarily freshwater fish, although T. helleri and T. meeki may occur in slightly brackish habitats.

Thorichthys have somewhat pointy heads and their body often has a large blackish spot, a broad dark horizontal stripe and/or a sometimes inconspicuous pattern of vertical bands. They mostly feed on invertebrates and detritus. Members of Thorichthys do not exceed 17 cm (6.7 in) in standard length, and they are popular aquarium fish, especially the well-known firemouth cichlid (T. meeki). Genetic evidence shows that Thorichthys is most closely related to Salvin's cichlid, the only species of the genus Trichromis, which is morphologically and behaviorally rather different. In contrast, Thorichthys is not particularly close to Cribroheros despite having several features that are similar.

== Species ==
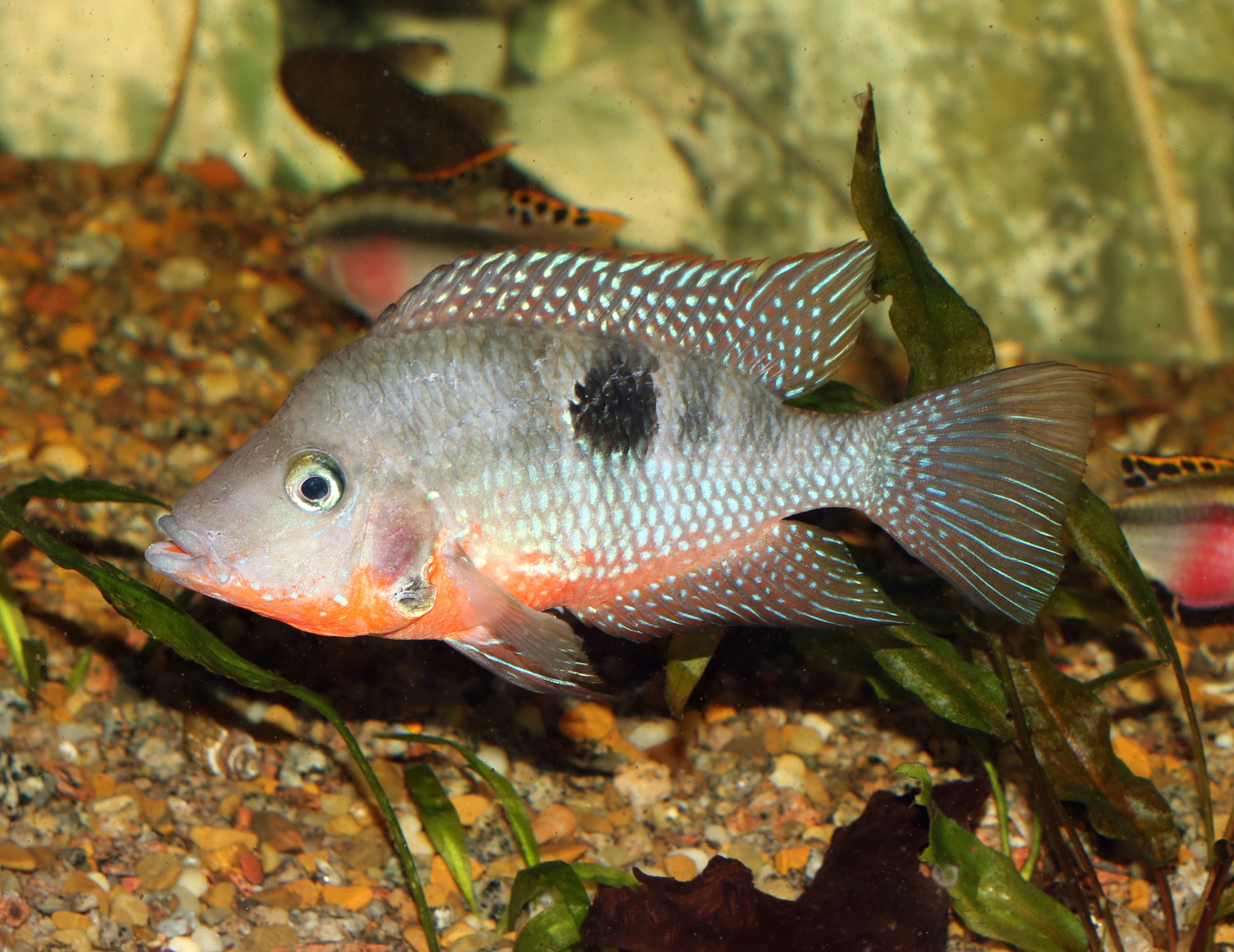
The well-known firemouth cichlid, T. meeki

There are currently 9 recognized species in this genus:

- Thorichthys affinis (Günther, 1862) (Yellow meeki)
- Thorichthys aureus (Günther, 1862) (Blue flash)
- Thorichthys callolepis (Regan, 1904) (San Domingo cichlid)
- Thorichthys helleri (Steindachner, 1864) (Yellow cichlid)
- Thorichthys maculipinnis (Steindachner, 1864)
- Thorichthys meeki Brind, 1918 (Firemouth cichlid)
- Thorichthys panchovillai Moral-Flores, López-Segovia & Hernández-Arellano, 2017
- Thorichthys pasionis (Rivas, 1962) (Blackgullet cichlid)
- Thorichthys socolofi (R. R. Miller & J. N. Taylor, 1984) (Chiapas cichlid)
