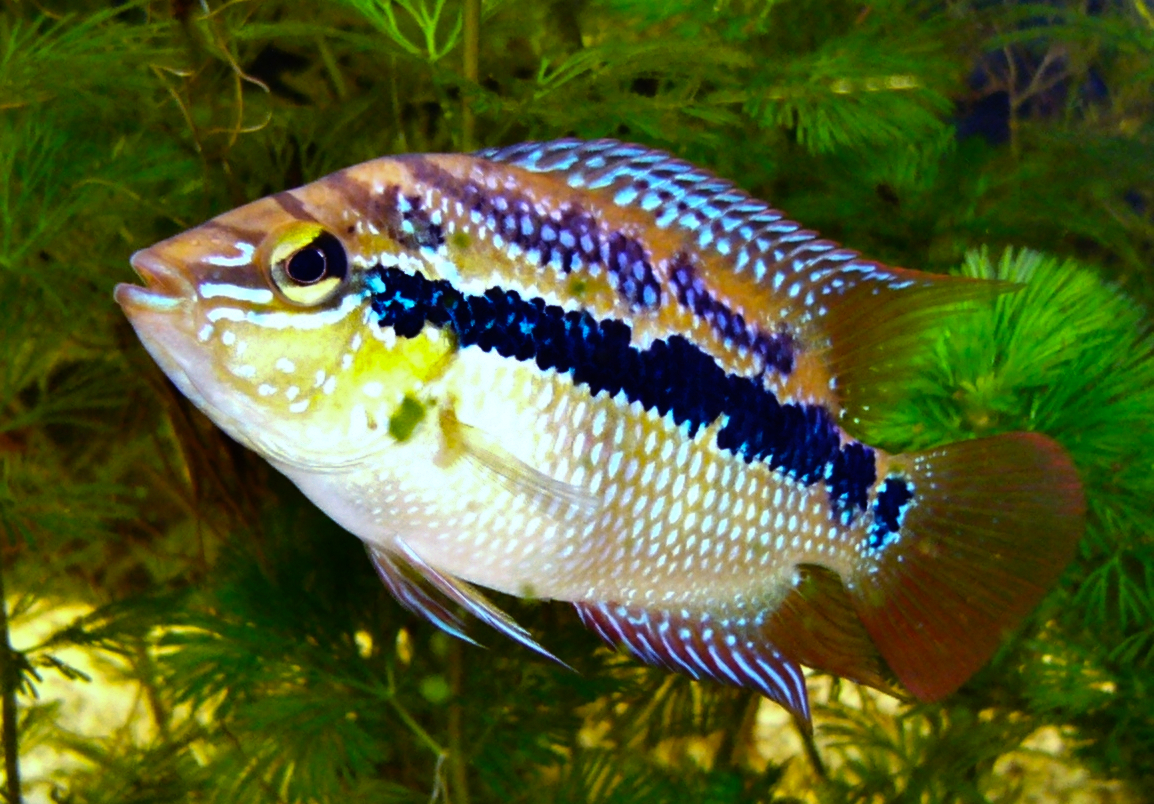

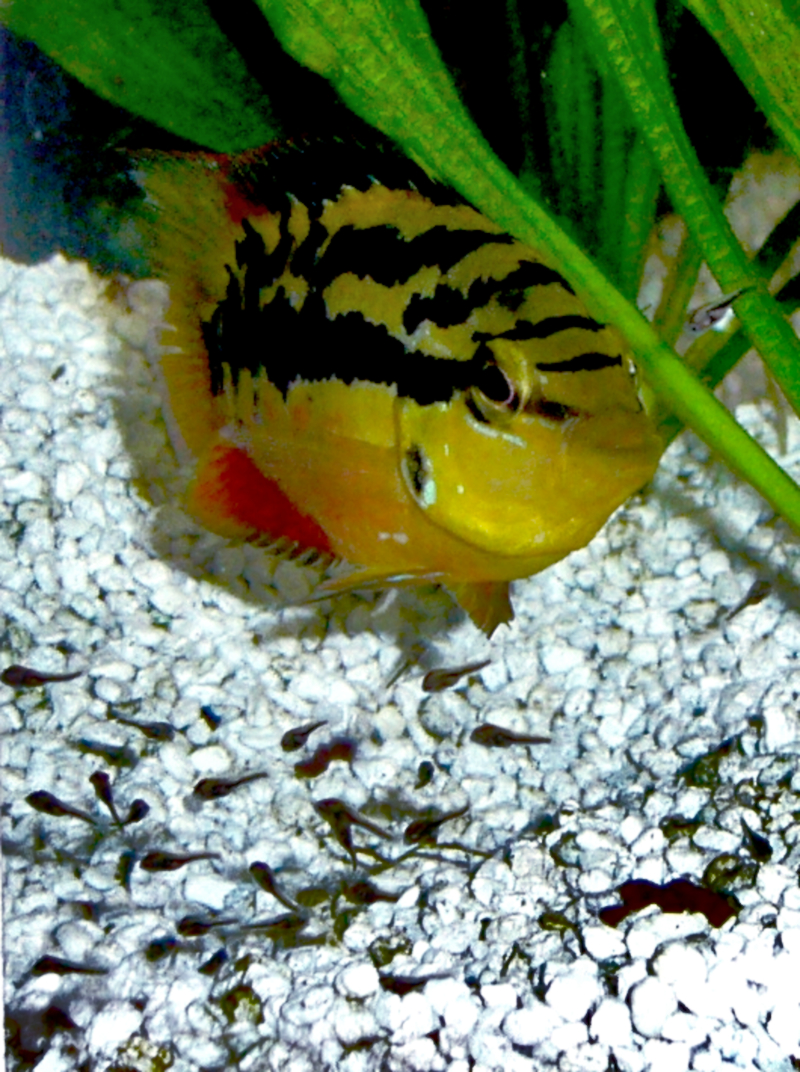
- male above, female with fry below

Conservation status
- Least Concern (IUCN 3.1)

Scientific classification
- Kingdom: Animalia
- Phylum: Chordata
- Class: Actinopterygii
- Order: Cichliformes
- Family: Cichlidae
- Subfamily: Cichlinae
- Tribe: Heroini
- Genus: Trichromis; McMahan & Chakrabarty, 2015
- Species: T. salvini

Binomial name
- Trichromis salvini (Günther, 1862)

Synonyms
- Species synonymy: Cichlasoma salvini (Günther, 1862); Cichlasoma tenue Meek, 1906; Heros triagramma Steindachner, 1864; Heros salvini Günther, 1862

= Salvin's cichlid =

Species of fish

The Salvin's cichlid (Trichromis salvini), also known as the yellow-belly cichlid or tricolored cichlid, is a species of the family Cichlidae. It is found in rivers of the Atlantic slope of southern Mexico, Belize, and Guatemala. It is the only species in the genus Trichromis.

== Taxonomy ==
In 2015, McMahan et al. published a paper placing this species in the genus Trichromis. The relationship of Salvin's cichlid to other Central American cichlid had long been debated. Genetic research by Říčan et al. revealed that the closest relatives to Trichromis are the firemouth cichlid and its congeners in the genus Thorichthys.

== Description ==
The Salvin's cichlid is oblong in shape and has a rather pointed mouth compared to other Central American cichlids. The body is yellow with two lines of black "flowers" along the side and upper half of the back of the fish. These flowers have a blue pearl outline. It has black bars that cross the face, and both sexes have red bellies, which is more pronounced in females, especially when ready to spawn. Females also have a patch in the center of the dorsal fin and a spot on the lower part of the gill cover. Females are smaller than males. Males are duller in color and have longer, more pointed fins. Both male and female become more vibrant during breeding.

== Distribution ==
Salvin's cichlid is found along the eastern coastal rivers and lagoons at lower elevations of Central America, from Mexico south to Honduras. This species is introduced in South Florida. The species prefers moderate to fast flowing currents.

== Dietary habits ==
Salvin's cichlid is a piscivore. It uses slight jaw protrusion to exploit prey located near riverbeds. Their 8.2% jaw protrusion only allows them to consume 48% of evasive prey.

== Reproduction ==
The female takes a more active role in initiating breeding and caring for fry than the male.

== Aquarium specimens ==
=== Care requirements ===
Salvin's cichlid is a very hardy fish, preferring temperatures between 22–27 °C (72–81 °F). They prefer a higher pH of around 8.0, and require the space of at least a 150 litres (33 imp gal; 40 US gal) tank. They grow to approximately 15 centimetres (5.9 in) in length and are quite aggressive toward other fish, but moderate aggressive towards same species. They require rocks and logs to hide in, and open swimming space.

=== Feeding ===
Salvin's cichlid accepts a wide variety of foods.
