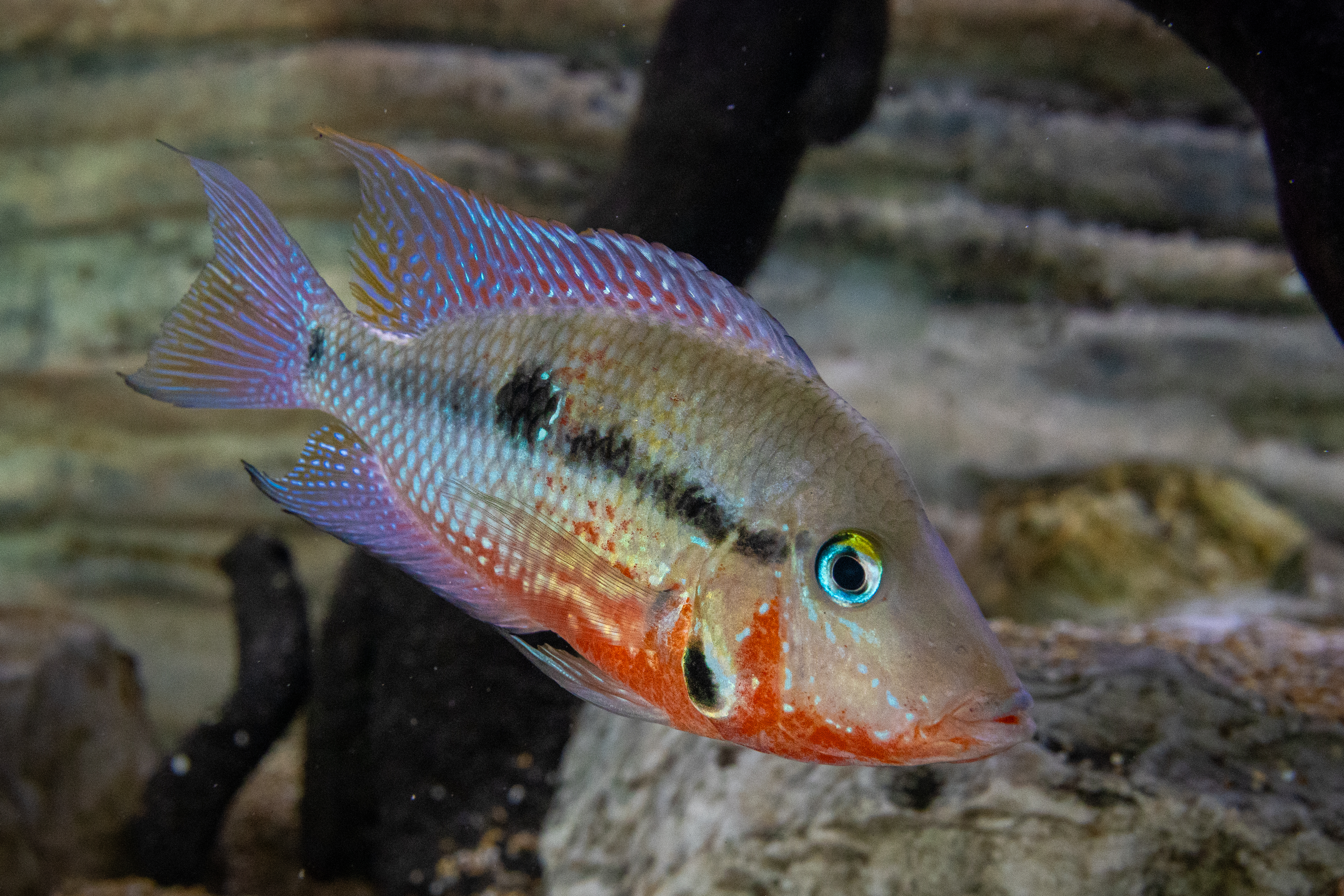

Conservation status
- Least Concern (IUCN 3.1)

Scientific classification
- Kingdom: Animalia
- Phylum: Chordata
- Class: Actinopterygii
- Order: Cichliformes
- Family: Cichlidae
- Subfamily: Cichlinae
- Tribe: Heroini
- Genus: Thorichthys
- Species: T. meeki

Binomial name
- Thorichthys meeki Brind, 1918

Synonyms
- Thorichthys helleri meeki Brind, 1918; Cichlasoma meeki (Brind, 1918); Herichthys meeki (Brind, 1918); Cichlasoma hyorhyncum C. L. Hubbs, 1935

= Firemouth cichlid =

Species of fish

The firemouth cichlid (Thorichthys meeki) is a species of cichlid fish native to Central America. They occur in rivers of the Yucatán Peninsula, Mexico, south through Belize and into northern Guatemala.

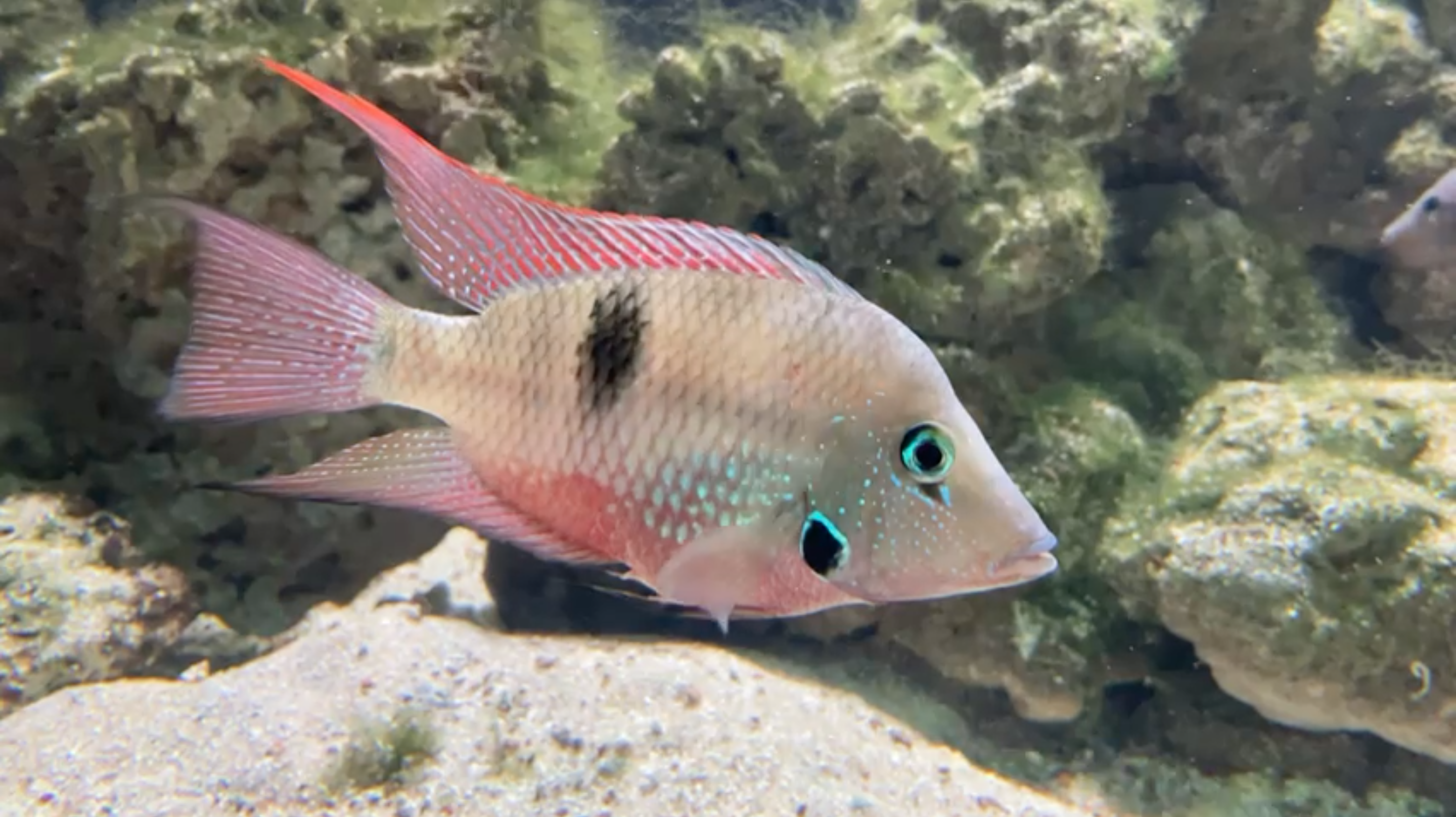
Vancouver Aquarium

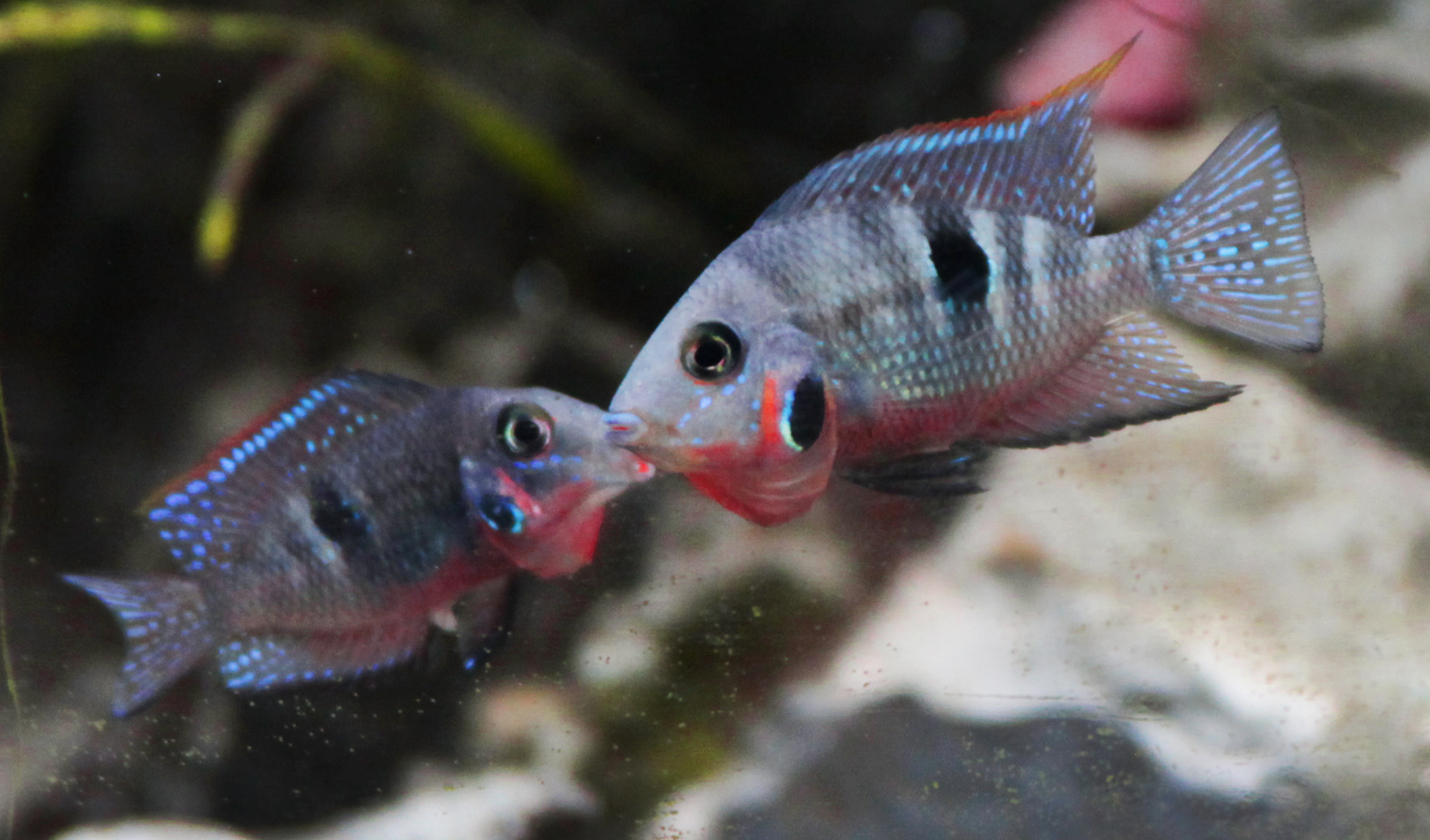
Fighting

Their natural habitat is typically shallow, slow-moving, often turbid, water with a pH of 6.5 - 8.0. It has also been reported to live in cave systems. As fish with a tropical distribution, firemouth cichlids live in warm water with a temperature range of 23–30 °C (73–86 °F). The common name "firemouth" is derived from the bright orange-red colouration on the underside of the jaw, while the specific epithet meeki honors American ichthyologist Seth Eugene Meek. Males in particular flare out their gills, exposing their red throats, in a threat display designed to ward off male rivals from their territory.

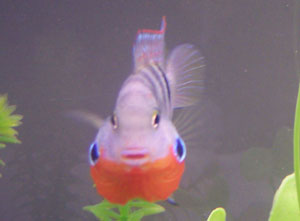
Male, gills flaring

Like most cichlids, brood care is highly developed; this species is an egg-layer. Firemouth cichlids form monogamous pairs and spawn on flattened surfaces of rocks, leaves or submerged wood. Breeding males are primarily responsible for territorial defense, while females are more intensively involved in raising the fry, though both parents lead the fry in search of food. Firemouth cichlids are omnivorous and opportunistic in their feeding strategies. Their ability to protrude their jaw 6% standard length limits their diet to about 6% evasive prey.

Sexual dimorphism is present, though limited in this species. Males are generally larger than females (up to 15 cm (5.9 in)), with brighter and more red colouration around the throat. They also have more pointed dorsal and anal fins. Firemouths are suitable for community aquaria, though they may become extremely aggressive to other members of its species and other community fish during spawning.

== See also ==
- List of freshwater aquarium fish species
