= Ancistrus maculatus =

Conservation status
- Data Deficient (IUCN 3.1)

Scientific classification
- Kingdom: Animalia
- Phylum: Chordata
- Class: Actinopterygii
- Division: Teleostei
- Order: Siluriformes
- Family: Loricariidae
- Genus: Ancistrus
- Species: A. maculatus

Binomial name
- Ancistrus maculatus (Steindachner, 1881)

Synonyms
- Chaetostomus cirrhosus maculatus Stendachner, 1881

Species of fish

Ancistrus maculatus is a species of freshwater ray-finned fish belonging to the family Loricariidae, the suckermouth armoured catfishes, and the subfamily Hypostominae, the suckermouth catfishes. This catfish, which is known only from its type series and may not be a valid species, is found in Brazil.

== Taxonomy ==
Ancistrus maculatus was first formally described as Chaetostomus cirrhosus maculatus in 1881 by the Austrian ichthyologist Franz Steindachner, with its type locality given as the Cudajas, Obidos, Tajapoura River, Chagres River, South America. Eschmeyer's Catalog of Fishes classified the genus Ancistrus in the subfamily Hypostominae, the suckermouth catfishes, within the suckermouth armored catfish family Loricariidae. It has also been classified in the tribe Ancistrini by some authorities.

== Etymology ==
Ancistrus maculatus is classified in the genus Ancistrus, a name coined by Rudolf Kner, but when he proposed the genus he did not explain the etymology of the name. It is thought to be from the Greek ágkistron, meaning a "fish hook" or the "hook of a spindle", a reference to the hooked odontodes on the interopercular bone. The specific name, maculatus, means "spotted", it was originally described as a spotted subspecies of A. cirrhosus.

== Description ==
Ancistrus maculatus reaches a standard length of 11.8 cm (4.6 in). This fish is known to have a modified iris called an omega iris, an adaptation shared with other loricariids. The top part of the iris descends to form a loop which can expand and contract, a structure which is known as an iris operculum. When light levels are high, such as during the day, the pupil reduces in diameter and the loop expands to cover the center of the pupil, forming a crescent-shaped, light-transmitting portion.

== Distribution ==
Ancistrus maculatus is known only from the type series which Steindachner said was collected in the Tajapoura River in Brazil as well as the Chagres River in Panama. It is known that specimens from Brazil and Panama were mixed and that some of the type series are A. chagresi. A lectotype of A. maculatus needs to be designated to stabilise the valididt of this taxon.

== Conservation status ==
Ancistrus maculatus is of uncertain taxonomic validity and its distribution, biology and population are unknown, the International Union for Conservation of Nature has therefore classifued this taxon as Data Deficient.
