= Ancistrus agostinhoi =

Conservation status
- Least Concern (IUCN 3.1)

Scientific classification
- Kingdom: Animalia
- Phylum: Chordata
- Class: Actinopterygii
- Order: Siluriformes
- Family: Loricariidae
- Genus: Ancistrus
- Species: A. agostinhoi

Binomial name
- Ancistrus agostinhoi Bifi, Pavanelli & Zawadzki, 2009

Species of catfish

Ancistrus agostinhoi is a species of freshwater ray-finned fish belonging to the family Loricariidae, the suckermouth armoured catfishes, and the subfamily Hypostominae, the suckermouth catfishes. This catfish is endemic to Brazil.

== Taxonomy ==
Ancistrus agostinhoi was first formally described in 2009 by the Brazilian ichthyologists Alessandro Gasparetto Bifi, Carla Simone Pavanelli and Cláudio Henrique Zawadzki with its type locality given as the Foz do Jordão, in the lower Rio Iguaçu basin, at 25°39'12"S, 51°58'15"W, in the Brazilian state of Paraná. Eschmeyer's Catalog of Fishes classified the genus Ancistrus in the subfamily Hypostominae, the suckermouth catfishes, within the suckermouth armored catfish family Loricariidae. It has also been classified in the tribe Ancistrini by some authorities.

== Etymology ==
Ancistrus agostinhoi is classified in the genus Ancistrus, a name coined by Rudolf Kner but when he proposed the genus Kner did not explain the etymology of the name. It is thought to be from the Greek ágkistron, meaning a "fish hook" or the "hook of a spindle", a reference to the hooked odontodes on the interopercular bone. The specific name, agostinhoi, honours Ângelo Antônio Agostinho, in recognition of his many and varied contributions to the knowledge of the ecology of Neotropical fishes, as well as his role in the foundation of Núcleo de Pesquisas em Limnologia, Ictiologia e Aquicultura (NUMELIA), State University of Maringá, an important centre for the study of Neotropical fish ecology.

== Description ==
Ancistrus agostinhoi is similar to A. abilhoai in that it has its dorsal fin supported by a single spine and 7 soft rays while its anal fin also has a single spine but only 3 or 4 soft rays. This species has a short barbel on the maxilla that is not free from the lower lip, it differs from that species in having a wider mazillary tooth row and larger eyes. It has an elongated body shape and it reaches a standard length of 9.6 cm (3.8 in).

== Distribution and habitat ==
Ancistrus agostinhoi is endemic to Brazil where it is only known to occur in the basin of the Jordão River in the state of Paraná, part of the basin of the Iguaçu River. Little is known about its biology or ecology.
