= Ancistrus macrophthalmus =

Conservation status
- Least Concern (IUCN 3.1)

Scientific classification
- Kingdom: Animalia
- Phylum: Chordata
- Class: Actinopterygii
- Division: Teleostei
- Order: Siluriformes
- Family: Loricariidae
- Genus: Ancistrus
- Species: A. macrophthalmus

Binomial name
- Ancistrus macrophthalmus (Pellegrin, 1912)

Synonyms
- Xenocara macrophthalma Pellegrin, 1912

Species of fish

Ancistrus macrophthalmus is a species of freshwater ray-finned fish belonging to the family Loricariidae, the suckermouth armoured catfishes, and the subfamily Hypostominae, the suckermouth catfishes. This catfish is found in Colombia and Vevezuela.

== Taxonomy ==
Ancistrus macrophthalmus was first formally described in 1912 by the French ichthyologist Jacques Pellegrin, with its type locality given as the Orinoco River in Venezuela. Eschmeyer's Catalog of Fishes classified the genus Ancistrus in the subfamily Hypostominae, the suckermouth catfishes, within the suckermouth armored catfish family Loricariidae. It has also been classified in the tribe Ancistrini by some authorities.

== Etymology ==
Ancistrus macrophthalmus is classified in the genus Ancistrus, a name coined by Rudolf Kner, but when he proposed the genus he did not explain the etymology of the name. It is thought to be from the Greek ágkistron, meaning a "fish hook" or the "hook of a spindle", a reference to the hooked odontodes on the interopercular bone. The specific name, lithurgicus, is an adjective derived from the Latin macrophthalmus, meaning a "large-eyed", a reference to the diameter of the eye being a fifth of the head length when compared to A. occidentalis, now regarded as a synonym of Ancistrus malacops, in which the diameter of the eye is a sixth or seventh of the head length.

== Description ==
Ancistrus macrophthalmus can be told apart from other Guianan shield Ancistrusspecies, by having a very flattened body and eyes placed high on the head. The tentacles on the middle part of the snout are arranged in a horseshoe shape with each half of the horshoe running from the tip of the snout to the lower margin of the eye. The middle plate under the rear of the membrane of the adipose fin is marginally taller than it is broad. It is dark grey above with cream or yellow spots and pale on the underside. Ancistrus species develop soft, bushy tentacles on the snout when sexually mature, these are better developed in the males than they are in females. This catfish reaches a standard length of 7.9 cm (3.1 in).

== Distribution and habitat ==
Ancistrus macrophthalmus occurs in the upper Orinoco River system from the Cinaruco River to the Casiquiare River in Colombia and Venezuela. This catfish is found in very high velocity water in rapids, its flattened shape suggests that it is found under rocks.

== Utilisation ==
Ancistrus macrophthalmus is widely available in the aquarium trade.
