= Ancistrus eustictus =

Conservation status
- Data Deficient (IUCN 3.1)

Scientific classification
- Kingdom: Animalia
- Phylum: Chordata
- Class: Actinopterygii
- Division: Teleostei
- Order: Siluriformes
- Family: Loricariidae
- Genus: Ancistrus
- Species: A. eustictus

Binomial name
- Ancistrus eustictus (Fowler, 1945)

Synonyms
- Pristiancistrus eustictus Fowler, 1945

Species of catfish

Ancistrus eustictus is a species of freshwater ray-finned fish belonging to the family Loricariidae, the suckermouth armoured catfishes, and the subfamily Hypostominae, the suckermouth catfishes. This catfish is endemic to Colombia.

== Taxonomy ==
Ancistrus eustictus was first formally described as Pristiancistrus eustictus in 1945 by the American zoologist Henry Weed Fowler, with its type locality given as the upper Baudó River on the Pacific slope of Colombia, from an elevation of "3,000 ft (910 m)". Some authorities regard this taxon as a synonym of A. centrolepis. Eschmeyer's Catalog of Fishes classified the genus Ancistrus in the subfamily Hypostominae, the suckermouth catfishes, within the suckermouth armored catfish family Loricariidae. It has also been classified in the tribe Ancistrini by some authorities.

== Etymology ==
Ancistrus eustictus is classified in the genus Ancistrus, a name coined by Rudolf Kner when he proposed the genus, but he did not explain the etymology of the name. It is thought to be from the Greek ágkistron, meaning a "fish hook" or the "hook of a spindle", a reference to the hooked odontodes on the interopercular bone. The specific name, eustictus, means "well spotted", thought to be an allusion to the five or six large black spots along the dorsal fin.

== Description ==
Ancistrus eustictus reaches a standard length of 18 cm (7.1 in). Ancistrus species develop soft, bushy tentacles on the snout when sexually mature; these are better developed in the males than they are in females.

== Distribution and habit ==
Ancistrus eustictus, if it is a valid species, is endemic to Colombia, where its range is uncertain but thought to be centred on the Baudó River on the Pacific Slope of the Andes.

== Conservation status ==
Ancistrus eustictus is of uncertain valididty as a species, and little is known about this taxon's range, biology or ecology, so the International Union for Conservation of Nature have classified it as Data Deficient.
