= Ancistrus tombador =

Conservation status
- Data Deficient (IUCN 3.1)

Scientific classification
- Kingdom: Animalia
- Phylum: Chordata
- Class: Actinopterygii
- Order: Siluriformes
- Family: Loricariidae
- Genus: Ancistrus
- Species: A. tombador

Binomial name
- Ancistrus tombador Fisch-Muller, A. R. Cardoso, J. F. P. da Silva & Bertaco, 2005

Species of catfish

Ancistrus tombador is a species of freshwater ray-finned fish belonging to the family Loricariidae, the suckermouth armoured catfishes, and the subfamily Hypostominae, the suckermouth catfishes. This catfish is endemic to Brazil.

== Taxonomy ==
Ancistrus tombador was first formally described in 2016 by the ichthyologists Sonia Fisch-Muller, who is Swiss, Alexandre Rodrigues Cardoso, José Francisco Pezzi da Silva and Vinicius de Araújo Bertaco, who are Brazilian, with its type locality given as on thed MT-338 road, about 26 km (16 mi) southeast from Porto dos Gaúchos, at 11°39'27"S, 57°12'07"W, from a tributary of the Arinos River, in the upper Tapajós basin in the Brazilian state of Mato Grosso. Eschmeyer's Catalog of Fishes classified the genus Ancistrus in the subfamily Hypostominae, the suckermouth catfishes, within the suckermouth armored catfish family Loricariidae. It has also been classified in the tribe Ancistrini by some authorities.

== Etymology ==
Ancistrus tombador is classified in the genus Ancistrus, a name coined by Rudolf Kner, but when he proposed the genus he did not explain the etymology of the name. It is thought to be from the Greek ágkistron, meaning a "fish hook" or the "hook of a spindle", a reference to the hooked odontodes on the interopercular bone. The specific name, tombador, is derived from the Serra do Tombador, where the type locality is located.

== Description ==
Ancistrus tombador has 8 soft rays in its dorsal fin and 5 in its anal fin. This species lacks an adipose fin and has between 3 and 5 platelets form a low crest in place of the adipose fin. The snout is naked along its edge, typically there are no tentacles on the snout, the body is very slender and the caudal peduncle is long and flat. This species reaches a standard length of 6.3 cm (2.5 in).

== Distribution and hbaitat ==
Ancistrus tombador is endemic to Brazil, where it occurs in the headwaters of the Juruena River, part of the Tapajós basin in the state of Mato Grosso. The collected specimens were found in headwater streams, indicating very specific habitat requirements.

== Conservation status ==
Ancistrus tombador is classified as Data Deficient by the IUCN. This is because it is unknown whether this species persists in the locations from which it was collected in the 2000s, these locations are not routinely sampled and because of this uncertainty, and taking into account the continuing degradation of habitat in that region.
