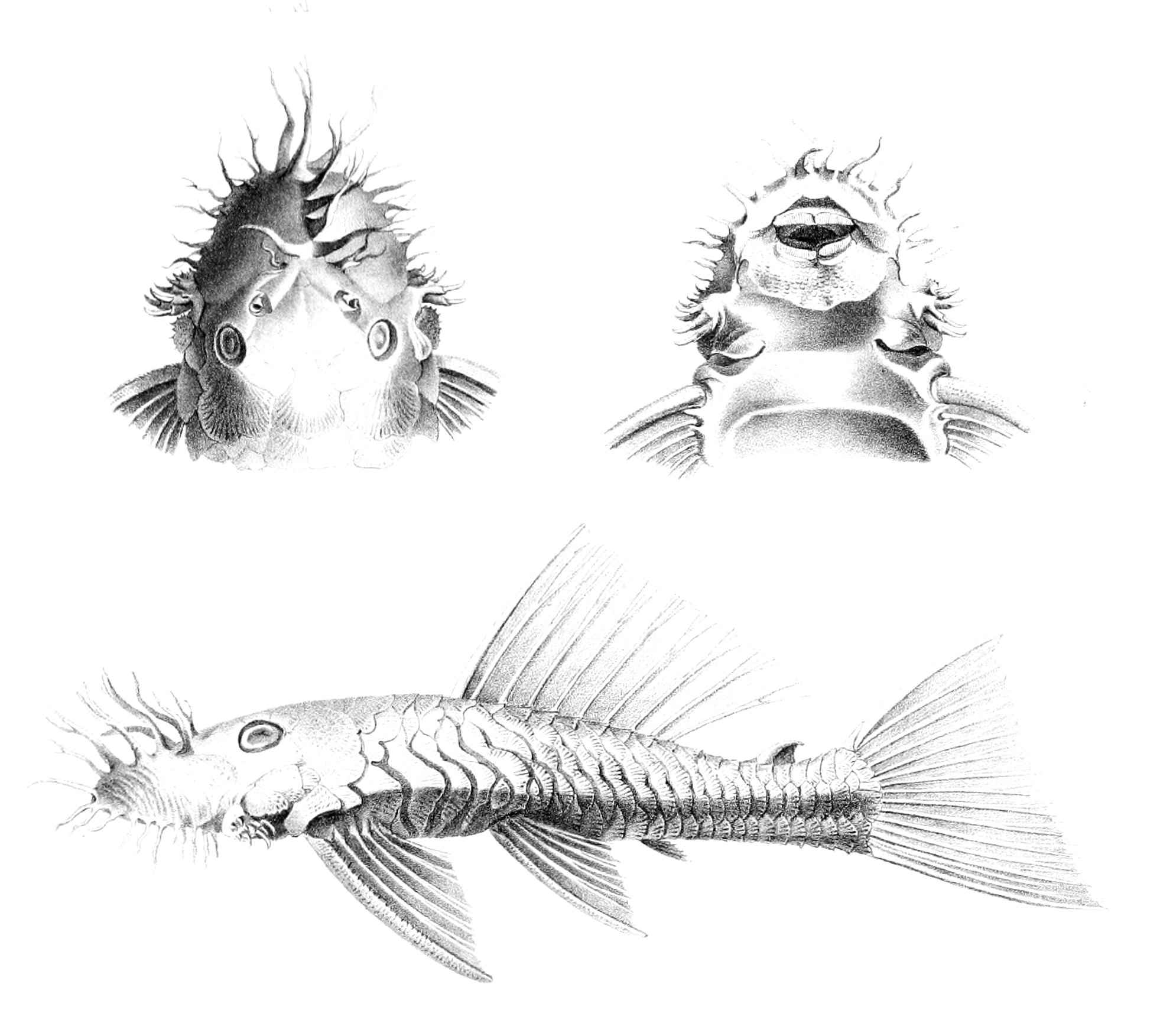

Conservation status
- Least Concern (IUCN 3.1)

Scientific classification
- Kingdom: Animalia
- Phylum: Chordata
- Class: Actinopterygii
- Division: Teleostei
- Order: Siluriformes
- Family: Loricariidae
- Genus: Ancistrus
- Species: A. dolichopterus

Binomial name
- Ancistrus dolichopterus Kner, 1854

Synonyms
- Hypostoma punctatum Jardine, 1841

= Bushymouth catfish =

Species of fish

The bushymouth catfish (Ancistrus dolichopterus) is a species of freshwater ray-finned fish belonging to the family Loricariidae, the suckermouth armoured catfishes, and the subfamily Hypostominae, the suckermouth catfishes. This catfish is found in South America.

== Taxonomy ==
The bushymouth catfish was first formally described in 1854 by the Austrian ichthyologist Rudolf Kner, with its type locality given as Manaus, Brazil. Eschmeyer's Catalog of Fishes classified the genus Ancistrus in the subfamily Hypostominae, the suckermouth catfishes, within the suckermouth armored catfish family Loricariidae. It has also been classified in the tribe Ancistrini by some authorities.

== Etymology ==
The bushymouth catfish is classified in the genus Ancistrus, a name coined by Rudolf Kner when he proposed the genus, but he did not explain the etymology of the name. It is thought to be from the Greek ágkistron, meaning a "fish hook" or the "hook of a spindle", a reference to the hooked odontodes on the interopercular bone. The specific name, dolichopterus, combines dolichos, meaning "long", and pteryx, meaning "fin", an allusion to the dorsal fin being as high as it is long, with its base having a length which is equal to the distance between it and the caudal fin.

== Description ==
The bushymouth catfish reaches a standard length of 14.5 cm (5.7 in). Ancistrus species develop soft, bushy tentacles on the snout when sexually mature. These are better developed in the males than they are in females.

== Distribution and habit ==
The bushymouth catfish is best known from the Rio Negro, basin but there are also records from the Amazon River and the Orinoco River. It has been recorded from Bolivia, Brazil, Colombia, Ecuador, Guyana, Peru and Venezuela. This is a demersal species which occurs in fast-flowing streams with submerged timber.
