= Ancistrus verecundus =

Conservation status
- Data Deficient (IUCN 3.1)

Scientific classification
- Kingdom: Animalia
- Phylum: Chordata
- Class: Actinopterygii
- Order: Siluriformes
- Family: Loricariidae
- Genus: Ancistrus
- Species: A. verecundus

Binomial name
- Ancistrus verecundus Fisch-Muller, A. R. Cardoso, J. F. P. da Silva & Bertaco, 2005

Species of catfish

Ancistrus verecundus is a species of freshwater ray-finned fish belonging to the family Loricariidae, the suckermouth armoured catfishes, and the subfamily Hypostominae, the suckermouth catfishes. This catfish is endemic to Brazil.

== Taxonomy ==
Ancistrus verecundus was first formally described in 2005 by the ichthyologists Sonia Fisch-Muller, who is Swiss, Alexandre Rodrigues Cardoso, José Francisco Pezzi da Silva and Vinicius de Araújo Bertaco, who are Brazilian, with its type locality given as the Piracolina Stream, about 6 km (3.7 mi) west of Vilhena, on road Br-364, in the upper Madeira River basin, at 12°43'33"S, 60°11'34"W, in the Brazilian state of Rondônia. Eschmeyer's Catalog of Fishes classified the genus Ancistrus in the subfamily Hypostominae, the suckermouth catfishes, within the suckermouth armored catfish family Loricariidae. It has also been classified in the tribe Ancistrini by some authorities.

== Etymology ==
Ancistrus verecundus is classified in the genus Ancistrus, a name coined by Rudolf Kner, but when he proposed the genus he did not explain the etymology of the name. It is thought to be from the Greek ágkistron, meaning a "fish hook" or the "hook of a spindle", a reference to the hooked odontodes on the interopercular bone. The specific name, verecundus, means "shy" or "modest" in Latin, an allusion to the reduced or absent tentacles on this fish's snout.

== Description ==
Ancistrus verecundus reaches a standard length of 5.5 cm (2.2 in). The dorsal fin contains 1 spine and 7 soft rays while the anal fin is suuported by 1 spine and 4 soft rays. This species does not have an adipose fin, the fin beingresplaces by between 3 and 5 unpaired platelets which form a ridge to the rear of the dorsal fin. The margins of the snout are naked and the tentacles on the snout are poorly developed or, typically, absent in both males and females. It also has a relatively deep and wide head and the base of the first pterygiophore in the anal fin is covered by skin.

== Distribution ==
Ancistrus verecundus is endemic to Brazil where it is known only from the Piracolina Stream, in the upper Madeira River, Vilhena in Rondônia, Brazil.

== Conservation status ==
Ancistrus jataensis is classified as Date Deficient by the International Union for Conservation of Nature because there is no information on its distribution and the threats that may affect it.
