= Ancistrus clementinae =

Conservation status
- Least Concern (IUCN 3.1)

Scientific classification
- Kingdom: Animalia
- Phylum: Chordata
- Class: Actinopterygii
- Order: Siluriformes
- Family: Loricariidae
- Genus: Ancistrus
- Species: A. clementinae

Binomial name
- Ancistrus clementinae Rendahl, 1937

Species of fish

Ancistrus clementinae is a species of freshwater ray-finned fish belonging to the family Loricariidae, the suckermouth armoured catfishes, and the subfamily Hypostominae, the suckermouth catfishes. This catfish is endemic to Ecuador.

== Taxonomy ==
Ancistrus clementinae was first formally described in 1937 by the Swedish zoologist, cartoonist and painter Hialmar Rendahl with its type locality given as the Río Clementina system, northwest of Babahoyo, Ecuador. Eschmeyer's Catalog of Fishes classified the genus Ancistrus in the subfamily Hypostominae, the suckermouth catfishes, within the suckermouth armored catfish family Loricariidae. It has also been classified in the tribe Ancistrini by some authorities.

== Etymology ==
Ancistrus clementinae is classified in the genus Ancistrus, a name coined by Rudolf Kner when he proposed the genus but Kner did not explain the etymology of the name. It is thought to be from the Greek ágkistron, meaning a "fish hook" or the "hook of a spindle", a reference to the hooked odontodes on the interopercular bone. The specific name, clementinae, means "of the Río Clementina", the type locality.

== Description ==
Ancistrus clementinae reaches a standard length of 10.2 cm (4.0 in). Ancistrus species develop soft, bushy tentacles on the snout when sexually mature, these are better developed in the males than they are in females. This species most sesembles A. tolima and A. vericaucanus in having short pectoral finsjust extend as far as the pelvic fin spine when flattened. Like A. vericaucanus this species has two plates in front of the adipose fin, which has a short, but separate adipose fin spine. A. clementinae has a highly flattened and slender body while A. vericaucanus has a far thicker and less flattened body.

== Distribution and habit ==
Ancistrus clementinae is endemic to Ecuador where it is found rivers draining towards the Pacific Ocean and it has been recorded from the Guayas River system as well as the Siete, Caluma, Bucay, Canayacu, Babahoya Rivers and the Santa Rosa River drainage;it is likely to be found in the tributaries in the Catamayo River's middle basin.
