= Ancistrus mattogrossensis =

Scientific classification
- Kingdom: Animalia
- Phylum: Chordata
- Class: Actinopterygii
- Division: Teleostei
- Order: Siluriformes
- Family: Loricariidae
- Genus: Ancistrus
- Species: A. mattogrossensis

Binomial name
- Ancistrus mattogrossensis A. Miranda-Ribeiro, 1912

Species of catfish

Ancistrus mattogrossensis is a species of freshwater ray-finned fish belonging to the family Loricariidae, the suckermouth armoured catfishes, and the subfamily Hypostominae, the suckermouth catfishes. It is, however, regarded as a species inquirenda. If valid, then this catfish is endemic to Brazil.

== Taxonomy ==
Ancistrus mattogrossensis was first formally described in 1912 by the Braziliam zoologist Alipio de Miranda Ribeiro, with its type locality given as the Brazilian state of Mato Grosso. However, this species is of uncertain validity; it is a species inquirenda. Eschmeyer's Catalog of Fishes classified the genus Ancistrus in the subfamily Hypostominae, the suckermouth catfishes, within the suckermouth armoured catfish family Loricariidae. It has also been classified in the tribe Ancistrini by some authorities.

== Etymology ==
Ancistrus mattogrossensis is classified in the genus Ancistrus, a name coined by Rudolf Kner, but when he proposed the genus he did not explain the etymology of the name. It is thought to be from the Greek ágkistron, meaning a "fish hook" or the "hook of a spindle", a reference to the hooked odontodes on the interopercular bone. The specific name, mattogrossensis, suffixes –ensis, which denotes place, onto Mato Grosso, the presumed type locality.

== Description ==
Ancistrus mattogrossensis develops soft, bushy tentacles on the snout when sexually mature. These are better developed in the males than they are in females.

== Distribution ==
Ancistrus mattogrossensis, if it is a valid species, is endemic to Mato Grosso in Brazil.
