= Ancistrus erinaceus =

Scientific classification
- Kingdom: Animalia
- Phylum: Chordata
- Class: Actinopterygii
- Order: Siluriformes
- Family: Loricariidae
- Genus: Ancistrus
- Species: A. erinaceus

Binomial name
- Ancistrus erinaceus (Valenciennes, 1840)

Synonyms
- Hypostomus erinaceus Valeneciennes, 1840

Species of catfish

Ancistrus erinaceus is a species of freshwater ray-finned fish belonging to the family Loricariidae, the suckermouth armoured catfishes, and the subfamily Hypostominae, the suckermouth catfishes. This catfish is kown only from its holotype which was said to be collected in Chile but this is thought likely to be an error.

== Taxonomy ==
Ancistrus erinaceus was first formally described as Hypostomus erinaceus by the French zoologist Achille Valenciennes in volume 15 of Histoire naturelle des poissons published in 1840 with its type locality given as "Chile". Eschmeyer's Catalog of Fishes classified the genus Ancistrus in the subfamily Hypostominae, the suckermouth catfishes, within the suckermouth armored catfish family Loricariidae. It has also been classified in the tribe Ancistrini by some authorities.

== Etymology ==
Ancistrus erinaceus is classified in the genus Ancistrus, a name coined by Rudolf Kner when he proposed the genus but Kner did not explain the etymology of the name. It is thought to be from the Greek ágkistron, meaning a "fish hook" or the "hook of a spindle", a reference to the hooked odontodes on the interopercular bone. The specific name, erinaceus, means "hedgehog", also thought to be a reference to the hooked odontodes on the interopercular region.

== Description ==
Ancistrus erinaceus reaches a standard length of 7.5 cm (3.0 in). Ancistrus species develop soft, bushy tentacles on the snout when sexually mature, these are better developed in the males than they are in females.

== Distribution and habit ==
Ancistrus erinaceus is known only from its holotype which Valenciennes stated was collected in Chile. No other Speciemns are known and there have been no further records. There are no other records of Ancistrus catfishes from Chile and the type locality given by Valenciennes is thought to be erroneous.
