= Ancistrus maximus =

Scientific classification
- Kingdom: Animalia
- Phylum: Chordata
- Class: Actinopterygii
- Division: Teleostei
- Order: Siluriformes
- Family: Loricariidae
- Genus: Ancistrus
- Species: A. maximus

Binomial name
- Ancistrus maximus R. R. de Oliveira, Zuanon, Zawadzki & Rapp Py-Daniel, 2015

Species of fish

Ancistrus maximus is a species of freshwater ray-finned fish belonging to the family Loricariidae, the suckermouth armoured catfishes, and the subfamily Hypostominae, the suckermouth catfishes. This catfish is found in Brazil.

== Taxonomy ==
Ancistrus maximus was first formally described in 2015 by the Brazilian ichthyologists Renildo Ribeiro de Oliveira, Jansen Alfredo Sampaio Zuanon, Cláudio Henrique Zawadzki and Lucia Helena Rapp Py-Daniel, with its type locality given as the Macoari stream, tributary to right side of Branco River at Rorainópolis in the Brazilian state of Roraima, at 1°09'12.1"S, 61°50'40.8"W. Eschmeyer's Catalog of Fishes classified the genus Ancistrus in the subfamily Hypostominae, the suckermouth catfishes, within the suckermouth armored catfish family Loricariidae. It has also been classified in the tribe Ancistrini by some authorities.

== Etymology ==
Ancistrus maximus is classified in the genus Ancistrus, a name coined by Rudolf Kner, but when he proposed the genus he did not explain the etymology of the name. It is thought to be from the Greek ágkistron, meaning a "fish hook" or the "hook of a spindle", a reference to the hooked odontodes on the interopercular bone. The specific name, maximus, means "large" or "great", an allusion to the large size of this catfish in comparison with related species.

== Description ==
Ancistrus maximus has its dorsal fin supported by 2 spines and 8 soft rays while its anal fin contains 5 soft rays. It has 8 branched rays in the dorsal fin, which is more than other related catfishes. The background colour is dark brown marked with reddish-orange spots that are nearly half the diameter of the pupil in adults and with the juveniles having reddish-orange bands on the distal portion of the dorsal and caudal fins. This species also has no hypertrophied odontodes on its lateral plates. This catfish reaches a standard length of 20.1 cm (7.9 in).

== Distribution ==
Ancistrus maximus is endemic to Brazil where it occurs in the drainage system of the Branco River in Roraima.
