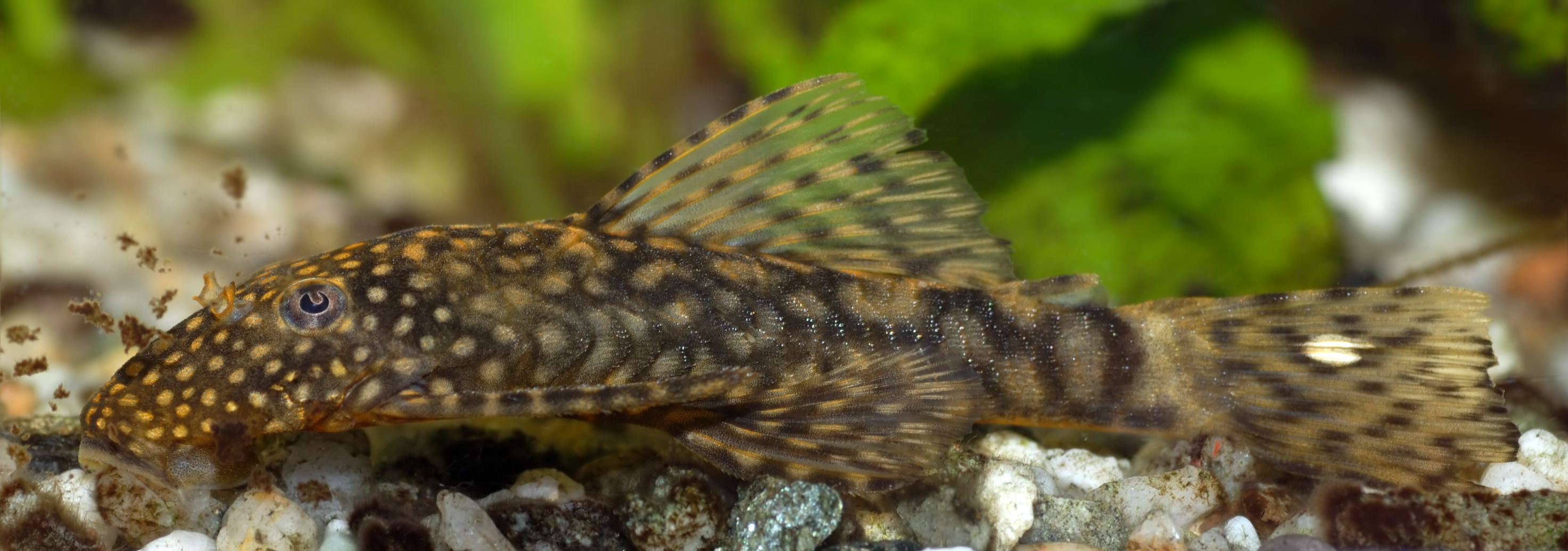
- Ancistrus sp.

Scientific classification
- Kingdom: Animalia
- Phylum: Chordata
- Class: Actinopterygii
- Order: Siluriformes
- Family: Loricariidae
- Subfamily: Hypostominae
- Genus: Ancistrus; Kner, 1854

Type species
- Hypostomus cirrhosus Valenciennes, 1836

Synonyms
- Pristiancistrus Fowler, 1945; Thysanocara Regan, 1906; Xenocara Regan, 1904

= Ancistrus =

Genus of fishes

Ancistrus is a genus of nocturnal freshwater fish in the family Loricariidae of order Siluriformes, native to freshwater habitats in South America and Panama. Fish of this genus are common in the aquarium trade where they are known as bushynose or bristlenose catfish. In the aquarium hobby they are often referred to as bushynose or bristlenose plecos instead, but this may lead to confusion as "pleco" usually is used for Hypostomus plecostomus and its allies and is often used as a catchall term for any loricariids remotely resembling that species.

== Taxonomy ==
The type species is Ancistrus cirrhosus. This genus is the largest genus within the tribe Ancistrini.

The name ancistrus derives from the Ancient Greek ἄγκιστρον agkistron meaning 'fish- or spindle hook' – a reference to the curved cheek odontodes of males. The genera Pristiancistrus, Thysanocara and Xenocara are now synonyms of Ancistrus.

== Description ==
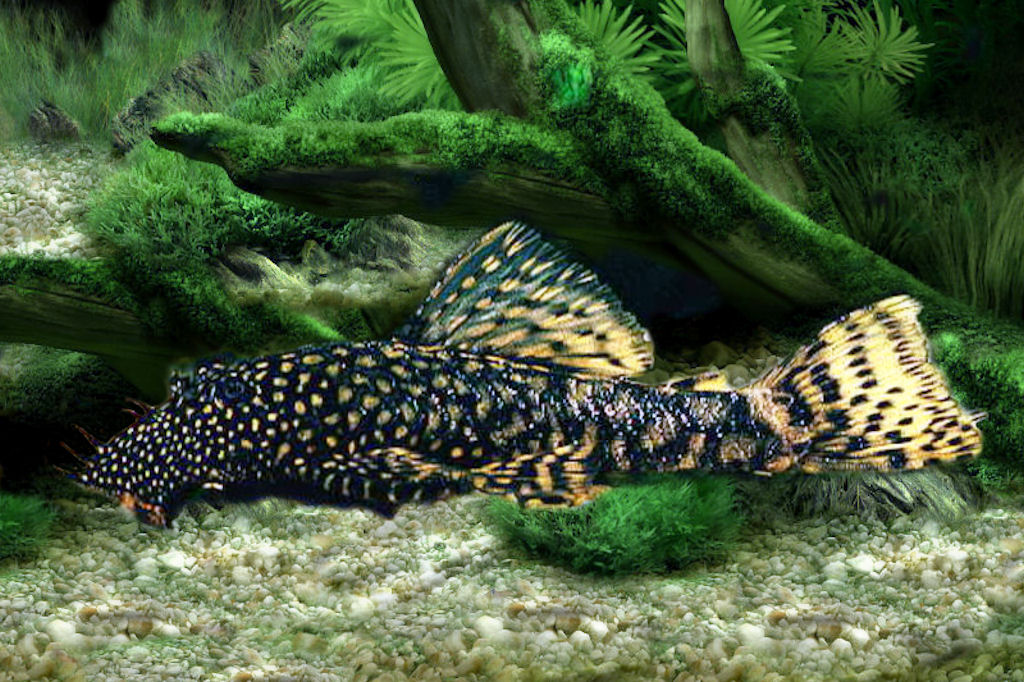
Ancistrus cirrhosus

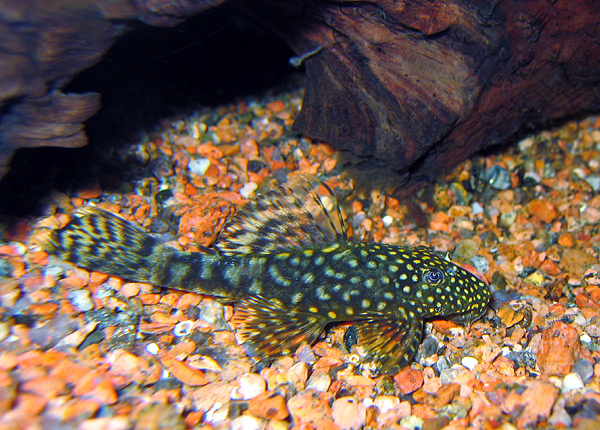
Ancistrus sp.

Ancistrus species show all the typical features of the Loricariidae. This includes a body covered in bony plates and a ventral suckermouth. The feature most commonly associated with the genus are the fleshy tentacles found on the head in adult males; females may possess tentacles along the snout margin but they are smaller and they lack tentacles on the head. Tentacules, tentacles directly associated with odontodes, develop on the pectoral fin spine of the males of some species. Males also have evertible cheek odontodes which are less developed or absent in females. They also lack odontodes along the snout. In comparison with a typical loricariid (pleco), a bristlenose is typically shorter (4–6 inches or 15 cm or less), more flattened and fatter with a comparatively wider head. Colouration is typically mottled brown, grey or black. Small white or yellow spots are common. In contrast to many other loricariid 'plecos' (many of which regularly exceed a foot in captivity), the bristlenose plecos do not usually exceed six inches in length; they can thus be kept in relatively small tanks, contributing to their popularity in the aquarium hobby.

Ancistrus species are unusual among vertebrates in possessing an X0 sex-determination system, which is the prevailing method in many lineages of arthropod but is very rare elsewhere in the animal kingdom.

== Distribution and habitat ==
Ancistrus is one of the widest ranging Loricariid genera, and representatives are found in most areas where the family in general is present. Many species are found in the rivers and floodplain areas of the Amazon basin, but there are also species elsewhere in tropical South America, as well as species on the island of Trinidad and two species, A. centrolepis and A. chagresi in Panama. Three species are true cavefish (troglobites): A. cryptophthalmus, A. galani and A. formoso. These are the only known loricariids that possess adaptions for a subterranean lifestyle, such as reduced pigmentation (appearing overall whitish) and eyes.

== Aquarium maintenance ==
In the wild, Ancistrus species prefer flowing water, so tanks with flow are typically used when keeping them in captivity. Since they are bottom-dwelling fish, substrate is considered preferable to a bare tank floor. Mixtures of gravel, dirt, and clay are frequently used as substrate for Ancistrus.

The aquarium size that is considered by some to be a minimum for fish of this genus is 25 gallons.

== Species ==
Ancistrus contains the following valid species:

- Ancistrus abilhoai Bifi, Pavanelli & Zawadzki, 2009
- Ancistrus agostinhoi Bifi, Pavanelli & Zawadzki, 2009
- Ancistrus aguaboensis Fisch-Muller, Mazzoni & C. Weber, 2001
- Ancistrus alga Cope, 1872
- Ancistrus amaris de Souza, Taphorn & Armbruster, 2019
- Ancistrus brevifilis (C. H. Eigenmann, 1920)
- Ancistrus brevipinnis (Regan, 1904)
- Ancistrus bufonius (Valenciennes, 1840)
- Ancistrus caucanus Fowler, 1943
- Ancistrus centrolepis Regan, 1913
- Ancistrus chagresi C. H. Eigenmann & R. S. Eigenmann, 1889
- Ancistrus cirrhosus (Valenciennes, 1836)
- Ancistrus claro Knaack, 1999
- Ancistrus clementinae Rendahl (de), 1937
- Ancistrus cryptophthalmus R. E. dos Reis, 1987
- Ancistrus cuiabae Knaack, 1999
- Ancistrus damasceni (Steindachner, 1907)
- Ancistrus dolichopterus Kner, 1854 (Bushy-mouth catfish)
- Ancistrus dubius C. H. Eigenmann & R. S. Eigenmann, 1889
- Ancistrus erinaceus (Valenciennes, 1840)
- Ancistrus eustictus (Fowler, 1945)
- Ancistrus falconensis Taphorn, Armbruster & Rodríguez-Olarte, 2010
- Ancistrus formoso Sabino & Trajano, 1997
- Ancistrus fulvus (Holly, 1929)
- Ancistrus galani A. Pérez & Viloria, 1994
- Ancistrus greeni (Isbrücker, 2001)
- Ancistrus gymnorhynchus Kner, 1854
- Ancistrus hoplogenys (Günther, 1864)
- Ancistrus jataiensis Fisch-Muller, A. R. Cardoso, J. F. P. da Silva & Bertaco, 2005
- Ancistrus jelskii (Steindachner, 1877)
- Ancistrus karajas R. R. de Oliveira, Rapp Py-Daniel, Zawadzki & Zuanon, 2016
- Ancistrus kellerae de Souza, Taphorn & Armbruster, 2019
- Ancistrus krenakarore R. R. de Oliveira, Rapp Py-Daniel, Zawadzki & Zuanon, 2016
- Ancistrus latifrons (Günther, 1869)
- Ancistrus leoni de Souza, Taphorn & Armbruster, 2019
- Ancistrus leucostictus (Günther, 1864)
- Ancistrus lineolatus Fowler, 1943
- Ancistrus lithurgicus C. H. Eigenmann, 1912
- Ancistrus luzia Neuhaus, Britto, Birindelli & Sousa, 2022
- Ancistrus macrophthalmus (Pellegrin, 1912)
- Ancistrus maculatus (Steindachner, 1881)
- Ancistrus malacops (Cope, 1872)
- Ancistrus maldonadoi Bifi & Ortega, 2020
- Ancistrus marcapatae (Regan, 1904)
- Ancistrus martini L. P. Schultz, 1944
- Ancistrus mattogrossensis A. Miranda-Ribeiro, 1912
- Ancistrus maximus R. R. de Oliveira, Zuanon, Zawadzki & Rapp Py-Daniel, 2015
- Ancistrus megacanthus Widholzer, Borsoi, Reis & Lehmann A. 2024
- Ancistrus megalostomus N. E. Pearson, 1924
- Ancistrus minutus Fisch-Muller, Mazzoni & C. Weber, 2001
- Ancistrus miracollis Bifi, de Oliveira & Rapp Py-Daniel, 2019
- Ancistrus montanus (Regan, 1904)
- Ancistrus mullerae Bifi, Pavanelli & Zawadzki, 2009
- Ancistrus multispinis (Regan, 1912)
- Ancistrus nudiceps (J. P. Müller & Troschel, 1849)
- Ancistrus occloi C. H. Eigenmann, 1928
- Ancistrus parecis Fisch-Muller, A. R. Cardoso, J. F. P. da Silva & Bertaco, 2005
- Ancistrus patronus de Souza, Taphorn & Armbruster, 2019
- Ancistrus pirareta Fisch-Muller, 1989
- Ancistrus piriformis Fisch-Muller, 1989
- Ancistrus ranunculus Fisch-Muller, Rapp Py-Daniel & Zuanon, 1994
- Ancistrus reisi Fisch-Muller, A. R. Cardoso, J. F. P. da Silva & Bertaco, 2005
- Ancistrus saudades de Souza, Taphorn & Armbruster, 2019
- Ancistrus sericeus (Cope, 1872)
- Ancistrus shuar Provenzano & Barriga Salazar, 2018
- Ancistrus spinosus Meek & Hildebrand, 1916
- Ancistrus stigmaticus C. H. Eigenmann & R. S. Eigenmann, 1889
- Ancistrus tamboensis Fowler, 1945
- Ancistrus taunayi A. Miranda-Ribeiro, 1918
- Ancistrus temminckii (Valenciennes, 1840)
- Ancistrus tolima Taphorn, Armbruster, Villa-Navarro & C. K. Ray, 2013
- Ancistrus tombador Fisch-Muller, A. R. Cardoso, J. F. P. da Silva & Bertaco, 2005
- Ancistrus trinitatis (Günther, 1864)
- Ancistrus triradiatus C. H. Eigenmann, 1918
- Ancistrus variolus (Cope, 1872)
- Ancistrus verecundus Fisch-Muller, A. R. Cardoso, J. F. P. da Silva & Bertaco, 2005
- Ancistrus vericaucanus Taphorn, Armbruster, Villa-Navarro & C. K. Ray, 2013
- Ancistrus yanesha Neuhaus, Meza-Vargas, Herrera & Lujan, 2023
- Ancistrus yutajae de Souza, Taphorn & Armbruster, 2019

== Ecology ==
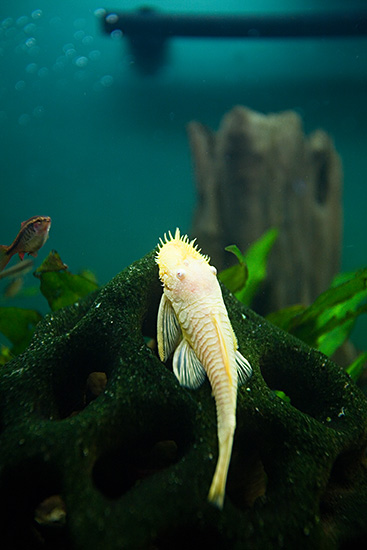
Albino bristlenose catfish are common in the aquarium trade.

The diet of this genus is typical for a Loricariid – algae, aufwuchs, and detritus, with sediment, sand, and gravel presumably ingested accidentally alongside food items. Despite reports among fish-keepers that they require wood in their diet, no scientific evidence to date supports members of this genus feeding on wood. Bristlenoses do not school but hide when not feeding, juveniles however are typically found in brightly lit shallows at the water margin making them susceptible to predation by birds.

Ancistrus species have the capability of obtaining oxygen through their modified stomach. This allows them to survive in conditions with low oxygen levels.

Breeding takes place in hollows, caves and mud holes in banks. Males may clean the inside of the cavity with their suckermouth before allowing the female to approach and inspect the nest. Courtship includes expanding the dorsal and caudal fins and attempts by the male to escort the female to the nest. While the female inspects the nest, the male keeps close contact. The female may lay 20–200 adhesive eggs, usually to the ceiling of the cavity.

The female plays no role in parental care; the male takes care of its young. Males will clean the eggs and the cavity with its fins and mouth. Males inspect eggs to remove diseased or infertile eggs, and aerates the clutch by fanning them with its pectoral and pelvic fins. During this time, a male usually will not leave the cavity to feed, or will leave only occasionally and quickly return. The eggs hatch in 4–10 days over a period of 2–6 hours; the male guards the eggs for 7–10 days after hatching. The fry remain in the cave, attaching to the walls and ceiling with their mouths, absorbing their yolk sac in 2–4 days and becoming free swimming.

Males of these species are competitive and territorial. Males display to each other by positioning themselves parallel to each other, head to tail, with dorsal and caudal fins erect and cheek odontode spines everted. If this escalates to combat, the males will circle each other and direct attacks at the head. If an intruding male manages to evict another male from the nest, it may cannibalize the other male's young.

A male bristlenose may guard several clutches of eggs simultaneously. Females prefer males that are already protecting eggs and may prefer males that are protecting larvae; it has been suggested that the tentacles may act as a fry mimic to attract females, which would allow males without eggs in their nest to compete with males guarding eggs. Several clutches in various states of development from eggs to free-swimming larvae can be found in one nest.

== In the aquarium ==
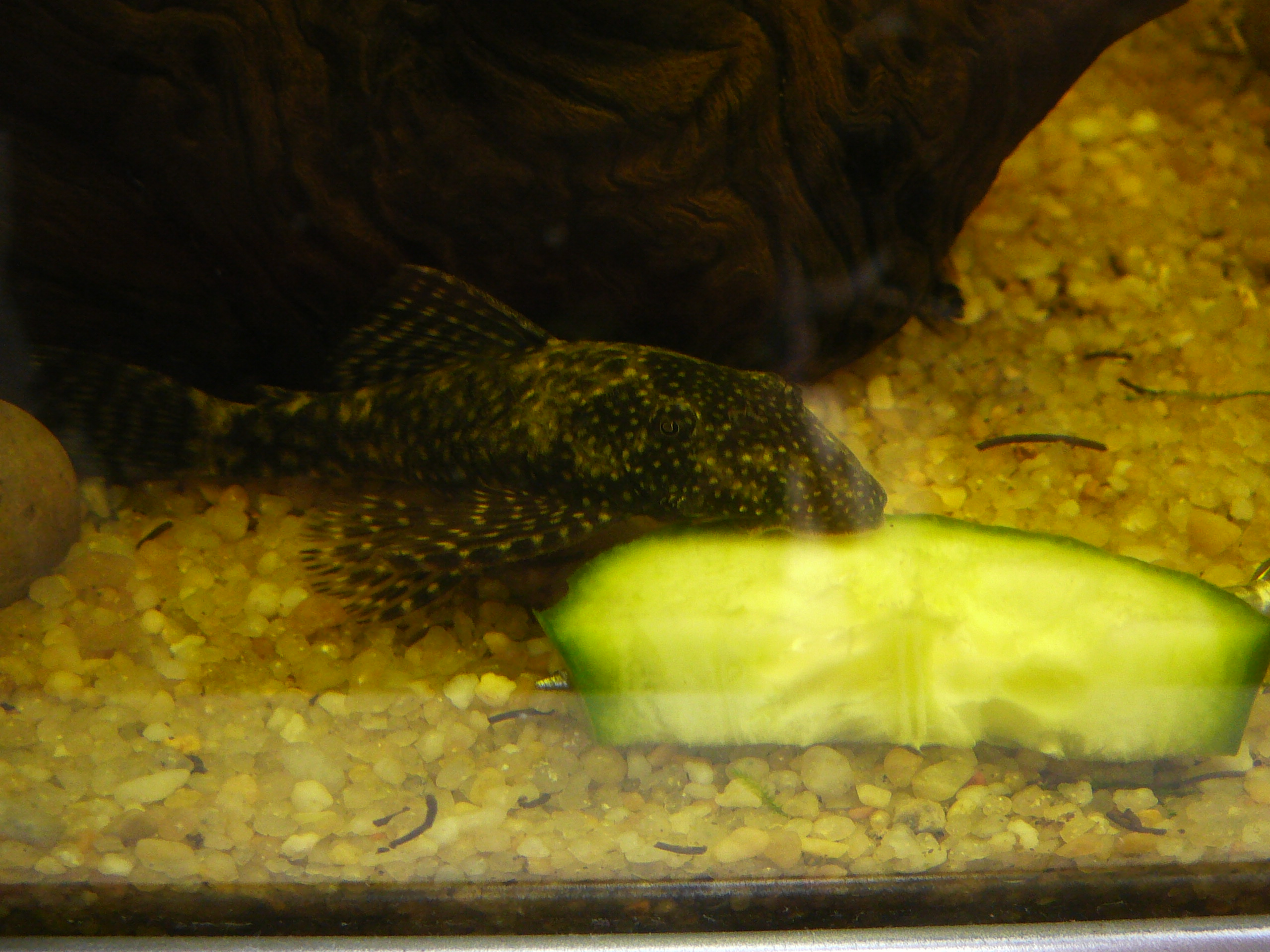
Female Ancistrus sp. on a piece of cucumber

These fish are often kept by aquarists, as they are dutiful algae-eaters and smaller in adult size than the common plecos usually seen in pet shops. They reach up to 15 cm (5.9 in) in males, and 12 cm (4.7 in) in females. Their recommended temperature is 23–27 °C (73–81 °F). Their lifespan is up to 12 years. They are hardy animals, tolerant to a wide range of water conditions. They breed easily in captivity, and are compatible with most other freshwater fish. Though typically mottled brown or black-and-grey spotted in color, other species are more exotic – spots of bright yellow on a dark background being a common pattern. Albino variants are also common. The albino morph is not caused by exposure to light during development, it is a morph controlled by genetics.

Historically, commonly available species of Ancistrus were Ancistrus cirrhosus and Ancistrus temminckii; other species are now available, though exact identification is difficult.

Feeding is easy, bristlenoses will graze on algae/ algae wafers and other surface growing organisms as well as eating algae wafers or tablets, flake food, squash, spinach, cucumber, zucchini, green beans, peas and even sliced carrots. They have also been known to accept frozen bloodworms as part of their diet. Aquarium specimens may starve for lack of algae or other plant matter; algae wafers or other low-protein foods are recommended. Keepers should watch for the abdomen to take on a sunken appearance, indicating insufficient nutrition.

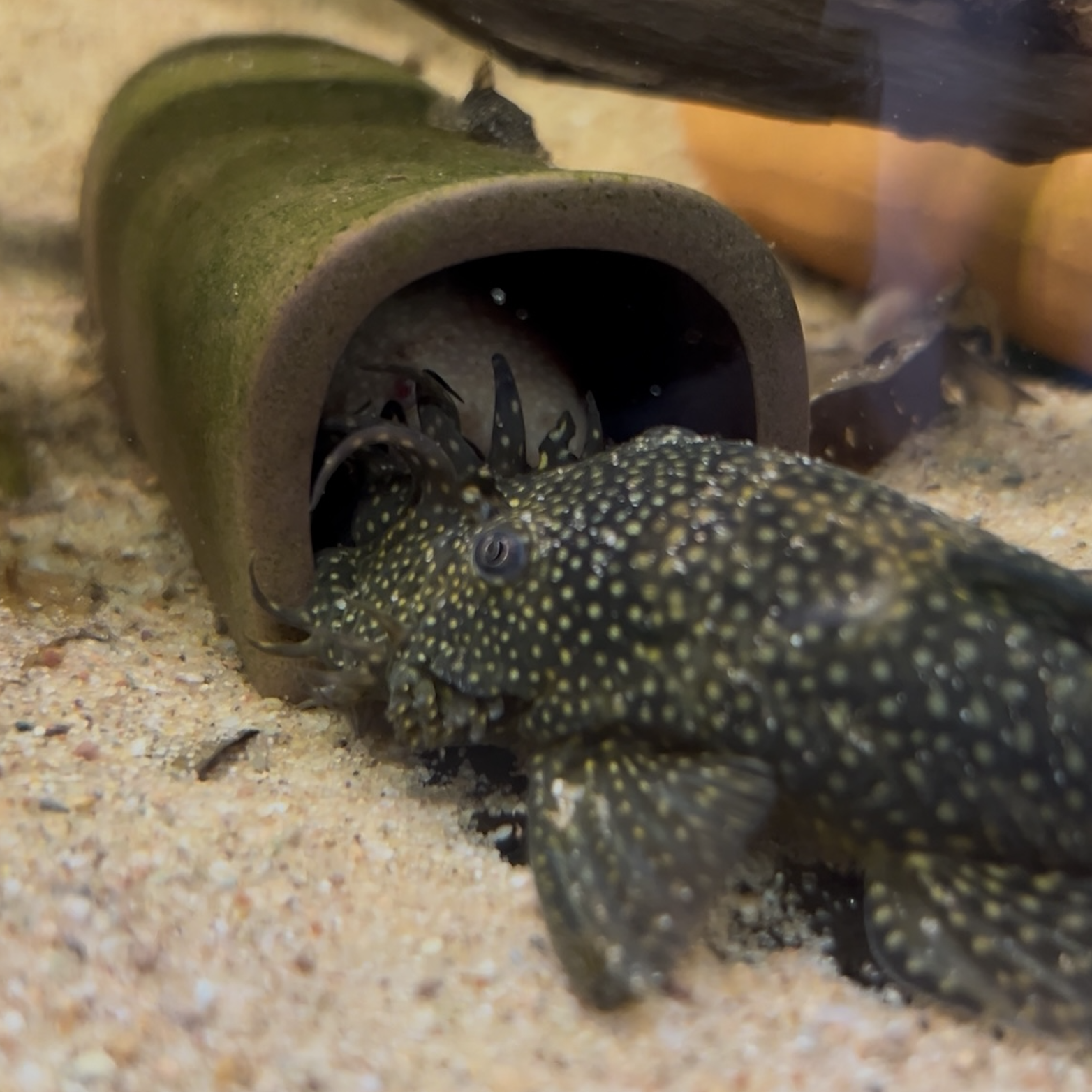
Male Ancistrus sp. trapping a female albino variant in a cave displaying typical breeding behaviour in home aquarium

Sexing is very easy as the female will only occasionally have bristles, around the edge of the chin, whereas the male will have them up the center of the head.

Breeding is also possible. Males attract females to a small cave or hollow, then guard eggs after fertilization through hatching (4–8 days) until fry are free swimming (4–6 days after hatching); the aquarist need only supply a suitable cave, food, and one of each sex.

Caution should be taken with the spines (odontodes); although the risk of personal injury is small with this genus, the hooked nature of the odontodes means that a bristlenose may become trapped in non-natural material such as sponge filters and netting.

== See also ==
- List of freshwater aquarium fish species
