= Ancistrus parecis =

Conservation status
- Near Threatened (IUCN 3.1)

Scientific classification
- Kingdom: Animalia
- Phylum: Chordata
- Class: Actinopterygii
- Division: Teleostei
- Order: Siluriformes
- Family: Loricariidae
- Genus: Ancistrus
- Species: A. parecis

Binomial name
- Ancistrus parecis Fisch-Muller, A. R. Cardoso, J. F. P. da Silva & Bertaco, 2005

Species of catfish

Ancistrus parecis is a species of freshwater ray-finned fish belonging to the family Loricariidae, the suckermouth armoured catfishes, and the subfamily Hypostominae, the suckermouth catfishes. This catfish is endemic to Brazil.

== Taxonomy ==
Ancistrus parecis was first formally described in 2005 by the ichthyologists Sonia Fisch-Muller, who is Swiss, Alexandre Rodrigues Cardoso, José Francisco Pezzi da Silva and Vinicius de Araújo Bertaco, who are Brazilian, with its type locality given as Campos de Júlio, on the Formiga River, a tributary of the Juruena River, in the upper Tapajós basin, on road BR-364, at 13°41'01"S, 59°12'11"W, in the Brazilian state of Mato Grosso. Eschmeyer's Catalog of Fishes classified the genus Ancistrus in the subfamily Hypostominae, the suckermouth catfishes, within the suckermouth armored catfish family Loricariidae. It has also been classified in the tribe Ancistrini by some authorities.

== Etymology ==
Ancistrus parecis is classified in the genus Ancistrus, a name coined by Rudolf Kner, but when he proposed the genus he did not explain the etymology of the name. It is thought to be from the Greek ágkistron, meaning a "fish hook" or the "hook of a spindle", a reference to the hooked odontodes on the interopercular bone. The specific name, parecis, is from the Chapada dos Parecis, the plateau on which the type locality is located.

== Description ==
Ancistrus parecis has a dorsal fin which is supported by 1 spine and 6 or 7 soft rays and an anal fin containing 1 spine and 4 soft rays. The adipose fin is absent and there is a small ridge of between 4 and 6 unpaired platelets where the adipose fin is located in other species, the adults have tentacles on the snout. This species has an elongated body shape and it reaches a standard length of 6.0 cm (2.4 in)>

== Distribution and habitat ==
Ancistrus parecis is endemic to Brazil where it occurs in the Juína and Formiga rivers, headwater tributaries of the Juruena River, part of the Tapajós River basin, in Mato Grosso. This catfish is found in small rivers and in stream s in riparian forest.

== Conservation status ==
Ancistrus parecis is threatened by habitat loss and degradation through urbanisation, agriculture and planned small hydroelectric schemes. It is only known from two locations and so has a restricted distribution. The International Union for Conservation of Nature has classified this species as Near Threatened.
