= Ancistrus gymnorhynchus =

Conservation status
- Least Concern (IUCN 3.1)

Scientific classification
- Kingdom: Animalia
- Phylum: Chordata
- Class: Actinopterygii
- Order: Siluriformes
- Family: Loricariidae
- Genus: Ancistrus
- Species: A. gymnorhynchus

Binomial name
- Ancistrus gymnorhynchus Kner, 1854

Synonyms
- Xenocara rothschildi Regan, 1905; Ancistrus rothschildi (Regan, 1905); Lasiancistrus nationi Fernández-Yépez, 1972; Ancistrus nationi Fernández-Yépez, 1972

Species of catfish

Ancistrus gymnorhynchus is a species of freshwater ray-finned fish belonging to the family Loricariidae, the suckermouth armoured catfishes, and the subfamily Hypostominae, the suckermouth catfishes. This catfish is endemic to Venezuela.

== Taxonomy ==
Ancistrus gymnorhynchus was first formally described in 1854 by the Austrian geologist, paleontologist, zoologist and Ichthyologist Rudolf Kner, with its type locality given as Puerto Cabello in Venezuela. Eschmeyer's Catalog of Fishes classified the genus Ancistrus in the subfamily Hypostominae, the suckermouth catfishes, within the suckermouth armored catfish family Loricariidae. It has also been classified in the tribe Ancistrini by some authorities.

== Etymology ==
Ancistrus gymnorhynchus is classified in the genus Ancistrus, a name coined by Kner, but when he proposed the genus he did not explain the etymology of the name. It is thought to be from the Greek ágkistron, meaning a "fish hook" or the "hook of a spindle", a reference to the hooked odontodes on the interopercular bone. The specific name, gymnorhynchus, means "naked snout", the holotype was a female which had less well developed tentacles on its snout.

== Description ==
Ancistrus gymnorhynchus reaches a standard length of 14.2 cm (5.6 in). Ancistrus species develop soft, bushy tentacles on the snout when sexually mature, these are better developed in the males than they are in females. Preserved specimens of this species can be told apart from Ancistrus species occurring in Venezuela by the plain brown grey or tan head and body with no dark or pale spots, except for a dark spot or blotch at the base of the membrane of the first dorsal fin.

== Distribution and habitat ==
Ancistrus gymnorhynchus is endemic to Venezuela where it occurs mostly distributed in coastal streams draining into the Caribbean Sea to the west of Caracas, in the states of Falcón, Lara and Carabobo, it is also found in the Pao River system, an Orinoco tributary. This catfish occurs in riffles, even near to the coast, in waters which vary from clear to white.
