= Ancistrus brevipinnis =

Conservation status
- Least Concern (IUCN 3.1)

Scientific classification
- Kingdom: Animalia
- Phylum: Chordata
- Class: Actinopterygii
- Order: Siluriformes
- Family: Loricariidae
- Genus: Ancistrus
- Species: A. brevipinnis

Binomial name
- Ancistrus brevipinnis (Regan, 1904)

Synonyms
- Xenocara brevipinnis Regan, 1904

Species of catfish

Ancistrus brevipinnis is a species of freshwater ray-finned fish belonging to the family Loricariidae, the suckermouth armoured catfishes, and the subfamily Hypostominae, the suckermouth catfishes. This catfish is endemic to Brazil.

== Taxonomy ==
Ancistrus brevipinnis was first formally described in 1904 by the British ichthyologist Charles Tate Regan with its type locality given as the Rio Grande do Sul, Brazil. Eschmeyer's Catalog of Fishes classified the genus Ancistrus in the subfamily Hypostominae, the suckermouth catfishes, within the suckermouth armored catfish family Loricariidae. It has also been classified in the tribe Ancistrini by some authorities.

== Etymology ==
Ancistrus brevipinnis is classified in the genus Ancistrus, a name coined by Rudolf Kner but when he proposed the genus Kner did not explain the etymology of the name. It is thought to be from the Greek ágkistron, meaning a "fish hook" or the "hook of a spindle", a reference to the hooked odontodes on the interopercular bone. The specific name, brevifilis, means "short fin" an allusion Regan did not explain but it may refer to the shorter dorsal fin spine than the other species Regan placed in the genus Xenocara.

== Description ==
Ancistrus brevipinnis reaches a standard length of 10.7 cm (4.2 in).

== Distribution and habit ==
Ancistrus brevipinnis is endemic to Brazil where it is found in the drainage basin of the Lagoa dos Patos in the Brazilian state of Rio Grande do Sul. This species is found in various habitats but it is more common in mountain streams where this species moves along the rocky bed or through the spaces between gravel and stones, it is more active at night.
