= Ancistrus variolus =

Conservation status
- Data Deficient (IUCN 3.1)

Scientific classification
- Kingdom: Animalia
- Phylum: Chordata
- Class: Actinopterygii
- Order: Siluriformes
- Family: Loricariidae
- Genus: Ancistrus
- Species: A. variolus

Binomial name
- Ancistrus variolus (Cope, 1872)

Synonyms<erf anme = "Cof genus"/>
- Chaetostomus variolus Cope, 1872

Species of catfish

Ancistrus variolus is a species of freshwater ray-finned fish belonging to the family Loricariidae, the suckermouth armoured catfishes, and the subfamily Hypostominae, the suckermouth catfishes. This catfish is endemic to Peru.

== Taxonomy ==
Ancistrus variolus was first formally described in 1872 by the American paleontologist and ichthyologist Edward Drinker Cope, with its type locality given as the Ambyiacu River in Peru. Eschmeyer's Catalog of Fishes classified the genus Ancistrus in the subfamily Hypostominae, the suckermouth catfishes, within the suckermouth armored catfish family Loricariidae. It has also been classified in the tribe Ancistrini by some authorities.

== Etymology ==
Ancistrus variolus is classified in the genus Ancistrus, a name coined by Rudolf Kner, but when he proposed the genus he did not explain the etymology of the name. It is thought to be from the Greek ágkistron, meaning a "fish hook" or the "hook of a spindle", a reference to the hooked odontodes on the interopercular bone. The specific name, variolus, is a masculisation of variola, which means "pox" or "pustule", a reference Cope did not explains but is thought to be a reference to the many large, round spots over its body.

== Description ==
Ancistrus variolus reaches a standard length of 4.2 cm (1.7 in). Ancistrus species develop soft, bushy tentacles on the snout when sexually mature, these are better developed in the males than they are in females.

== Distribution and habitat ==
Ancistrus variolus is found in the Amazon basin in Peru. This species is found in rivers with mixed, black and white waters, with a lot of woody debris and other organic matter, in shady waters within primary forest, where it is typically found in submerged logs.

== Conservation status ==
Ancistrus variolus is classified as Data Deficient by the International Union for Conservation of Nature because this species is very difficult to identify and this obscures its true status.
