= Ancistrus nudiceps =

Conservation status
- Least Concern (IUCN 3.1)

Scientific classification
- Kingdom: Animalia
- Phylum: Chordata
- Class: Actinopterygii
- Order: Siluriformes
- Family: Loricariidae
- Genus: Ancistrus
- Species: A. nudiceps

Binomial name
- Ancistrus nudiceps (J. P. Müller & Troschel, 1849)

Synonyms
- Hypostomus nudiceps J. P. Müller & Troschel, 1849

Species of catfish

Ancistrus nudiceps is a species of freshwater ray-finned fish belonging to the family Loricariidae, the suckermouth armoured catfishes, and the subfamily Hypostominae, the suckermouth catfishes. This catfish is endemic to Brazil.

== Taxonomy ==
Ancistrus nudiceps was first formally described as Hypostomus nudiceps in 1849 by the German zoologists Johannes Peter Müller and Franz Hermann Troschel with its type locality given as Takutu in Guyana. Eschmeyer's Catalog of Fishes classified the genus Ancistrus in the subfamily Hypostominae, the suckermouth catfishes, within the suckermouth armored catfish family Loricariidae. It has also been classified in the tribe Ancistrini by some authorities.

== Etymology ==
Ancistrus nudiceps is classified in the genus Ancistrus, a name coined by Rudolf Kner but when he proposed the genus Kner did not explain the etymology of the name. It is thought to be from the Greek ágkistron, meaning a "fish hook" or the "hook of a spindle", a reference to the hooked odontodes on the interopercular bone. The specific name, nudiceps, means "naked head", which runs for one third of the distance between the tip of the snout and the rear margin of the eye.

== Description ==
Ancistrus nudiceps reaches a standard length of 7.9 cm (3.1 in). Ancistrus species develop soft, bushy tentacles on the snout when sexually mature, these are better developed in the males than they are in females.

== Distribution and habitat ==
Ancistrus nudiceps is found in northern South America where it occurs throughout the basin of Essequibo River in Guyana and Venezuela, and in the Takutu River on the border between Brazil and Guyana. This species uses a wide variety of habitats from floodlplain lakes to riffles, this catfish is not as flattened as many Ancistrus species and these deeper bodied species favour slower flowing water more than their flattened congeners.
