= Ancistrus jelskii =

Conservation status
- Data Deficient (IUCN 3.1)

Scientific classification
- Kingdom: Animalia
- Phylum: Chordata
- Class: Actinopterygii
- Order: Siluriformes
- Family: Loricariidae
- Genus: Ancistrus
- Species: A. jelskii

Binomial name
- Ancistrus jelskii (Steindachner, 1877)

Synonyms
- Chaetostomus jelskii Steindachner, 1877

Species of catfish

Ancistrus jelskii is a species of freshwater ray-finned fish belonging to the family Loricariidae, the suckermouth armoured catfishes, and the subfamily Hypostominae, the suckermouth catfishes. This catfish is endemic to Peru.

== Taxonomy ==
Ancistrus jelskii was first formally described as Chaetostomus jelskii in 1877 by the Austrian ichthyologist Franz Steindachner, with its type locality given as Amable Maria and Monterico in Peru. Eschmeyer's Catalog of Fishes classified the genus Ancistrus in the subfamily Hypostominae, the suckermouth catfishes, within the suckermouth armored catfish family Loricariidae. It has also been classified in the tribe Ancistrini by some authorities.

== Etymology ==
Ancistrus jelskii is classified in the genus Ancistrus, a name coined by Rudolf Kner, but when he proposed the genus he did not explain the etymology of the name. It is thought to be from the Greek ágkistron, meaning a "fish hook" or the "hook of a spindle", a reference to the hooked odontodes on the interopercular bone. The specific name, jelskii, honours the collector of the holotype, the Belarusian-Polish ornithologist Konstanty Jelski.

== Description ==
Ancistrus jelskii reaches a total length of 8 cm (3.1 in). Ancistrus species develop soft, bushy tentacles on the snout when sexually mature, these are better developed in the males than they are in females.

== Distribution ==
Ancistrus jelskii is endemic to Peru where it is found in the Amazon basin in the Tulumayo River basin, a tributary of the Perené River, in the Upper Ucayali River system. This catfish is a benthic freshwater fish that lives on rocky or mixed gravel and sand substrate, where it feeds on periphyton.

== Conservation status ==
Ancistrus jelskii is classified as Data Deficient by the International Union for Conservation of Nature because there very little information on its range, population status, and the threats that are affecting it. A major problems with many Ancistrus species is the difficulty of identify;ing them which results in many fishes in this genus are not yet identified to the species level, meaning that is its difficult to discern the actual distribution of this species.
