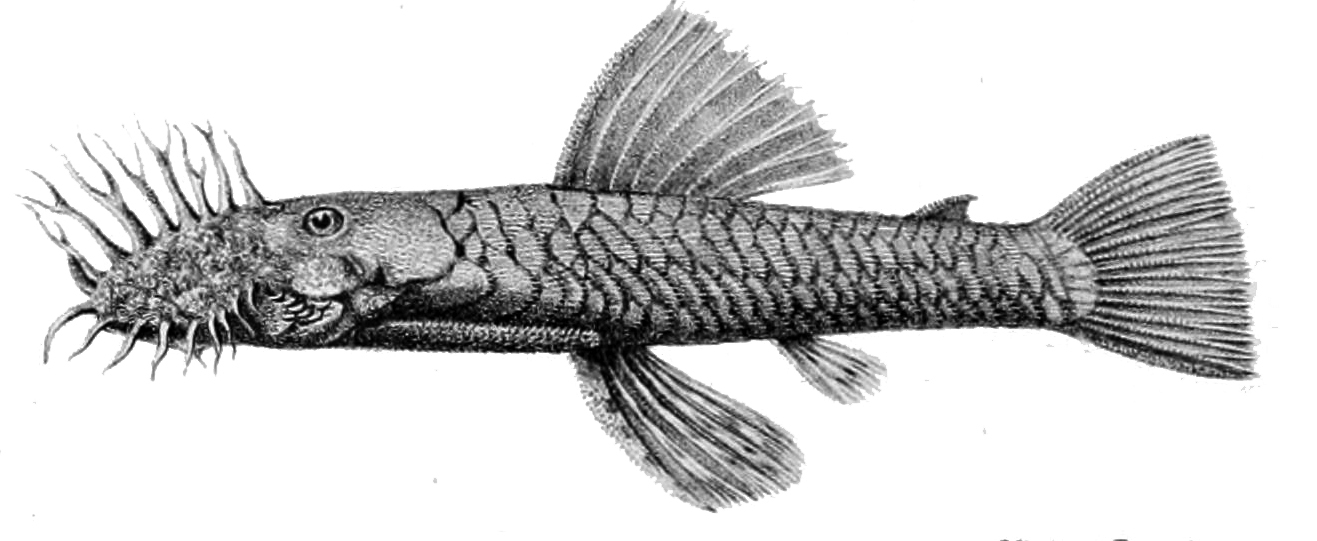

Conservation status
- Least Concern (IUCN 3.1)

Scientific classification
- Kingdom: Animalia
- Phylum: Chordata
- Class: Actinopterygii
- Order: Siluriformes
- Family: Loricariidae
- Genus: Ancistrus
- Species: A. montanus

Binomial name
- Ancistrus montanus (Regan, 1904)

Synonyms
- Xenocara montana Regan, 1904

= Ancistrus montanus =

Species of catfish

Ancistrus montanus is a species of freshwater ray-finned fish belonging to the family Loricariidae, the suckermouth armoured catfishes, and the subfamily Hypostominae, the suckermouth catfishes. This catfish is endemic to Bolivia.

== Taxonomy ==
Ancistrus montanus was first formally described as Xenocara montana in 1904 by the British ichthyologist Charles Tate Regan, with its type locality given as the Tumupasa, in the Andes of Bolivia, at an elevation of 1,500 ft (460 m). Eschmeyer's Catalog of Fishes classified the genus Ancistrus in the subfamily Hypostominae, the suckermouth catfishes, within the suckermouth armored catfish family Loricariidae. It has also been classified in the tribe Ancistrini by some authorities.

== Etymology ==
Ancistrus montanus is classified in the genus Ancistrus, a name coined by Rudolf Kner but when he proposed the genus Kner did not explain the etymology of the name. It is thought to be from the Greek ágkistron, meaning a "fish hook" or the "hook of a spindle", a reference to the hooked odontodes on the interopercular bone. The specific name, montanus, means "of the mountains", the type locality being in the Andes Mountains in Bolivia.

== Description ==
Ancistrus montanus reaches a standard length of 9.2 cm (3.6 in). Ancistrus species develop soft, bushy tentacles on the snout when sexually mature, these are better developed in the males than they are in females.

== Distribution and habitat ==
Ancistrus montanus is endemic to Bolivia where it occurs in the basin of the Beni River. This catfish occurs in rivers and streams, living in clear water and feeding on periphyton.
