= Ancistrus mullerae =

Conservation status
- Least Concern (IUCN 3.1)

Scientific classification
- Kingdom: Animalia
- Phylum: Chordata
- Class: Actinopterygii
- Order: Siluriformes
- Family: Loricariidae
- Genus: Ancistrus
- Species: A. mullerae

Binomial name
- Ancistrus mullerae Bifi, Pavanelli & Zawadzki, 2009

Species of catfish

Ancistrus mullerae is a species of freshwater ray-finned fish belonging to the family Loricariidae, the suckermouth armoured catfishes, and the subfamily Hypostominae, the suckermouth catfishes. This catfish is endemic to Brazil.

== Taxonomy ==
Ancistrus mullerae was first formally described in 2009 by the Brazilian ichthyologists Alessandro Gasparetto Bifi, Carla Simone Pavanelli and Cláudio Henrique Zawadzki with its type locality given as Três Barras do Paraná on the Guaraní River, a tributary of the Iguaçu River, at 25°25'29"S, 53°07'30"W, in the Brazilian state of Paraná. Eschmeyer's Catalog of Fishes classified the genus Ancistrus in the subfamily Hypostominae, the suckermouth catfishes, within the suckermouth armored catfish family Loricariidae. It has also been classified in the tribe Ancistrini by some authorities.

== Etymology ==
Ancistrus mullerae is classified in the genus Ancistrus, a name coined by Rudolf Kner but when he proposed the genus Kner did not explain the etymology of the name. It is thought to be from the Greek ágkistron, meaning a "fish hook" or the "hook of a spindle", a reference to the hooked odontodes on the interopercular bone. The specific name, mullerae, honours the Swiss ichthyologist Sonia Fisch-Muller, of the Natural History Museum of Geneva, for her contributions to the study of the fishes in the genus Ancistrus.

== Description ==
Ancistrus mullerae has an elongated body and it reaches a standard length of 12.5 cm (4.9 in). It has a dorsal fin which is supported by 1 spine and 7 soft rays and an anal fin containing 1 spine and 3 or 4 soft rays. Ancistrus species develop soft, bushy tentacles on the snout when sexually mature, these are better developed in the males than they are in females.

== Distribution and habitat ==
Ancistrus mullerae is endemic to Brazil, where it occurs in the lower Iguaçu River basin, above the Iguaçu Falls in the southern Brazilian state of Paraná.

== Biology ==
Ancistrus mullerae feeds on detritus and algae.
