= Ancistrus hoplogenys =

Conservation status
- Least Concern (IUCN 3.1)

Scientific classification
- Kingdom: Animalia
- Phylum: Chordata
- Class: Actinopterygii
- Order: Siluriformes
- Family: Loricariidae
- Genus: Ancistrus
- Species: A. hoplogenys

Binomial name
- Ancistrus hoplogenys (Günther, 1864)

Synonyms
- Chaetostomus hoplogenys Günther, 1864; Chaetostomus (Ancistrus) cirrhosus var. punctata Steindachner, 1881; Ancistrus punctatus (Steindachner, 1881)

Species of fish

Ancistrus hoplogenys is a species of freshwater ray-finned fish belonging to the family Loricariidae, the suckermouth armoured catfishes, and the subfamily Hypostominae, the suckermouth catfishes. This catfish is found in South America.

== Taxonomy ==
Ancistrus hoplogenys was first formally described as Chaetostomus hoplogenys in 1864 by the German-born British herpetologist and ichthyologist Albert Günther, with its type locality given as the Capim River in the Brazilian state of Pará. Eschmeyer's Catalog of Fishes classified the genus Ancistrus in the subfamily Hypostominae, the suckermouth catfishes, within the suckermouth armored catfish family Loricariidae. It has also been classified in the tribe Ancistrini by some authorities.

== Etymology ==
Ancistrus hoplogenys is classified in the genus Ancistrus, a name coined by Rudolf Kner, but when he proposed the genus he did not explain the etymology of the name. It is thought to be from the Greek ágkistron, meaning a "fish hook" or the "hook of a spindle", a reference to the hooked odontodes on the interopercular bone. The specific name, hoplogenys, combines hoplon, meaning "shield" or "armour", with genys, which means "jaw", although in ichthyological terminology it can mean either lower jaw or cheek, an allusion to the eight or nine curved spines between the eyes.

== Description ==
Ancistrus hoplogenys reaches a standard length of 15.8 cm (6.2 in). Ancistrus species develop soft, bushy tentacles on the snout when sexually mature, these are better developed in the males than they are in females. This catfish has eight or nine flexible and curved spines on the interopercular bone, for which it is named.

== Distribution and habitat ==
Ancistrus hoplogenys has a wide distribution in South America being found in the Amazon and Paraguay River basins, as well as in the coastal drainages of the Guianas, including Essequibo basin, and in the Orinoco, middle Paraná and La Plata basins. The species has been recorded fromn Argentina, Brazil, Bolivia, Colombia, Ecuador, Guyana, Paraguay, Peru, Suriname, Uruguay and Venezuela. It is found in rivers.

== Utilisation ==
Ancistrus hoplogenys occurs in the aquarium hobby, where this fish is sometimes known as the spotted or starlight bristlenose pleco, although it may also be referred to by its L-number, which is L059.
