= Ancistrus brevifilis =

Conservation status
- Vulnerable (IUCN 3.1)

Scientific classification
- Kingdom: Animalia
- Phylum: Chordata
- Class: Actinopterygii
- Order: Siluriformes
- Family: Loricariidae
- Genus: Ancistrus
- Species: A. brevifilis

Binomial name
- Ancistrus brevifilis C. H. Eigenmann, 1920

Species of catfish

Ancistrus brevifilis is a species of freshwater ray-finned fish belonging to the family Loricariidae, the suckermouth armoured catfishes, and the subfamily Hypostominae, the suckermouth catfishes. This catfish is endemic to Venezuela.

== Taxonomy ==
Ancistrus brevifilis was first formally described in 1920 by the German American ichthyologist Carl H. Eigenmann with its type locality given as the Río Tiquirito at El Consejo, Venezuela. Eschmeyer's Catalog of Fishes classified the genus Ancistrus in the subfamily Hypostominae, the suckermouth catfishes, within the suckermouth armored catfish family Loricariidae. It has also been classified in the tribe Ancistrini by some authorities.

== Etymology ==
Ancistrus brevifilis is classified in the genus Ancistrus, a name coined by Rudolf Kner but when he proposed the genus Kner did not explain the etymology of the name. It is thought to be from the Greek ágkistron, meaning a "fish hook" or the "hook of a spindle", a reference to the hooked odontodes on the interopercular bone. The specific name, brevifilis, means "short thread" an allusion to the short paired or grouped tentacles on the snout of this species.

== Description ==
Ancistrus brevifilis has short paired or grouped tentacles on their snout. This species reaches a standard length of 11.8 cm (4.6 in).

== Distribution and habit ==
Ancistrus brevifilis is endemic to Venezuela where it is known with certainty only from the basin of the Tuy River basin in the north of that nation. The catfishes of the genus Ancistrus are typically found along with the banks of rivers and streams where the water is clear and torrential. They feed on periphyton on wood or aquatic macrophytes.

== Conservation status ==
Ancistrus brevifilis has a restricted range, where its habitat is under anthropogenic threats from agriculture and urbanisation. The International Union for Conservation of Nature have classified this species as Vulnerable.
