= Ancistrus occloi =

Conservation status
- Least Concern (IUCN 3.1)

Scientific classification
- Kingdom: Animalia
- Phylum: Chordata
- Class: Actinopterygii
- Order: Siluriformes
- Family: Loricariidae
- Genus: Ancistrus
- Species: A. occloi

Binomial name
- Ancistrus occloi C. H. Eigenmann, 1928

Species of catfish

Ancistrus occloi is a species of freshwater ray-finned fish belonging to the family Loricariidae, the suckermouth armoured catfishes, and the subfamily Hypostominae, the suckermouth catfishes. This catfish is endemic to Peru.

== Taxonomy ==
Ancistrus occloi was first formally described in 1928 by the German-born American ichthyologist Carl H. Eigenmann with its type locality given as the Urubamba River at Ollantaytambo, in the Upper Amazon system of Peru, from an elevation of 9,000 ft (2,700 m). Eschmeyer's Catalog of Fishes classified the genus Ancistrus in the subfamily Hypostominae, the suckermouth catfishes, within the suckermouth armored catfish family Loricariidae. It has also been classified in the tribe Ancistrini by some authorities.

== Etymology ==
Ancistris occloi is classified in the genus Ancistrus, a name coined by Rudolf Kner but when he proposed the genus Kner did not explain the etymology of the name. It is thought to be from the Greek ágkistron, meaning a "fish hook" or the "hook of a spindle", a reference to the hooked odontodes on the interopercular bone. The specific name, occloi, means of Mama Ocllo, the Inca mother and fertility deity and, in Inca mythology, the sister and wife of Manco Cápac, the legendary founder of the Inca civilisation.

== Description ==
Ancistrus occloi reaches a standard length of 11.6 cm (4.6 in). This species has between 20 and 25 spines on the interopercular. Ancistrus species develop soft, bushy tentacles on the snout when sexually mature, these are better developed in the males than they are in females.

== Distribution and habitat ==
Ancistrus occloi is endemic to Peru where it is found in the upper Urubamaba river sistem and in the Pachitea River basin, inn the Upper Amazon basin. This is a demersal fish of high altitude waters.
