= Ancistrus reisi =

Conservation status
- Data Deficient (IUCN 3.1)

Scientific classification
- Kingdom: Animalia
- Phylum: Chordata
- Class: Actinopterygii
- Order: Siluriformes
- Family: Loricariidae
- Genus: Ancistrus
- Species: A. reisi

Binomial name
- Ancistrus reisi Fisch-Muller, A. R. Cardoso, J. F. P. da Silva & Bertaco, 2005

Species of catfish

Ancistrus reisi is a species of freshwater ray-finned fish belonging to the family Loricariidae, the suckermouth armoured catfishes, and the subfamily Hypostominae, the suckermouth catfishes. This catfish is endemic to Brazil.

== Taxonomy ==
Ancistrus reisi was first formally described in 2005 by the ichthyologists Sonia Fisch-Muller, who is Swiss, Alexandre Rodrigues Cardoso, José Francisco Pezzi da Silva and Vinicius de Araújo Bertaco, who are Brazilian, with its type locality given as Mambaí, the Dores stream, a tributary of the Vermelho River, at 14°29'S, 46°06'W, in the Tocantins River basin, in the Brazilian state of Goiás. Eschmeyer's Catalog of Fishes classified the genus Ancistrus in the subfamily Hypostominae, the suckermouth catfishes, within the suckermouth armored catfish family Loricariidae. It has also been classified in the tribe Ancistrini by some authorities.

== Etymology ==
Ancistrus reisiis classified in the genus Ancistrus, a name coined by Rudolf Kner, but when he proposed the genus he did not explain the etymology of the name. It is thought to be from the Greek ágkistron, meaning a "fish hook" or the "hook of a spindle", a reference to the hooked odontodes on the interopercular bone. The specific name, reisi, homours the Brazilian ichthyologist Roberto Esser dos Reis for his contributions to the knowledge of Neotropical fishes.
