= Ancistrus jataiensis =

Conservation status
- Data Deficient (IUCN 3.1)

Scientific classification
- Kingdom: Animalia
- Phylum: Chordata
- Class: Actinopterygii
- Order: Siluriformes
- Family: Loricariidae
- Genus: Ancistrus
- Species: A. jataiensis

Binomial name
- Ancistrus jataiensis Fisch-Muller, A. R. Cardoso, J. F. P. da Silva & Bertaco, 2005

Species of fish

Ancistrus jataiensis is a species of freshwater ray-finned fish belonging to the family Loricariidae, the suckermouth armoured catfishes, and the subfamily Hypostominae, the suckermouth catfishes. This catfish is endemic to Brazil.

== Taxonomy ==
Ancistrus jataiensis was first formally described in 2005 by the ichthyologists Sonia Fisch-Muller, who is Swiss, Alexandre Rodrigues Cardoso, José Francisco Pezzi da Silva and Vinicius de Araújo Bertaco, who are Brazilian, with its type locality given as Mambaí, the Jataí stream, a tributary of Vermelho, at 14°29'S, 46°06'W, in the Tocantins River basin in the Brazilian state of Goiás. Eschmeyer's Catalog of Fishes classified the genus Ancistrus in the subfamily Hypostominae, the suckermouth catfishes, within the suckermouth armored catfish family Loricariidae. It has also been classified in the tribe Ancistrini by some authorities.

== Etymology ==
Ancistrus jataiensis is classified in the genus Ancistrus, a name coined by Rudolf Kner, but when he proposed the genus he did not explain the etymology of the name. It is thought to be from the Greek ágkistron, meaning a "fish hook" or the "hook of a spindle", a reference to the hooked odontodes on the interopercular bone. The specific name, jataensis, puts the Latin suffix-ensis on Jata, the name of the stream which is the type locality.

== Description ==
Ancistrus jataensis reaches a standard length of 5.4 cm (2.1 in). Ancistrus species develop soft, bushy tentacles on the snout when sexually mature, these are better developed in the males than they are in females.

== Distribution ==
Ancistrus jataensis is endemic to Brazil where it has only ever been encountered at or near its type locality which is in the upper Tocantins River basin, in the state of Goiás.

== Conservation status ==
Ancistrus jataensis is known from only two locations in the upper Tocantins River basin in Goiás, the genus Ancistrus is known for having a number of difficult to identify taxa and the area where this taxon is known from has not been well sampled by ichthyologists. These factors have led the International Union for Conservation of Nature to classify this species as Data Deficient.
