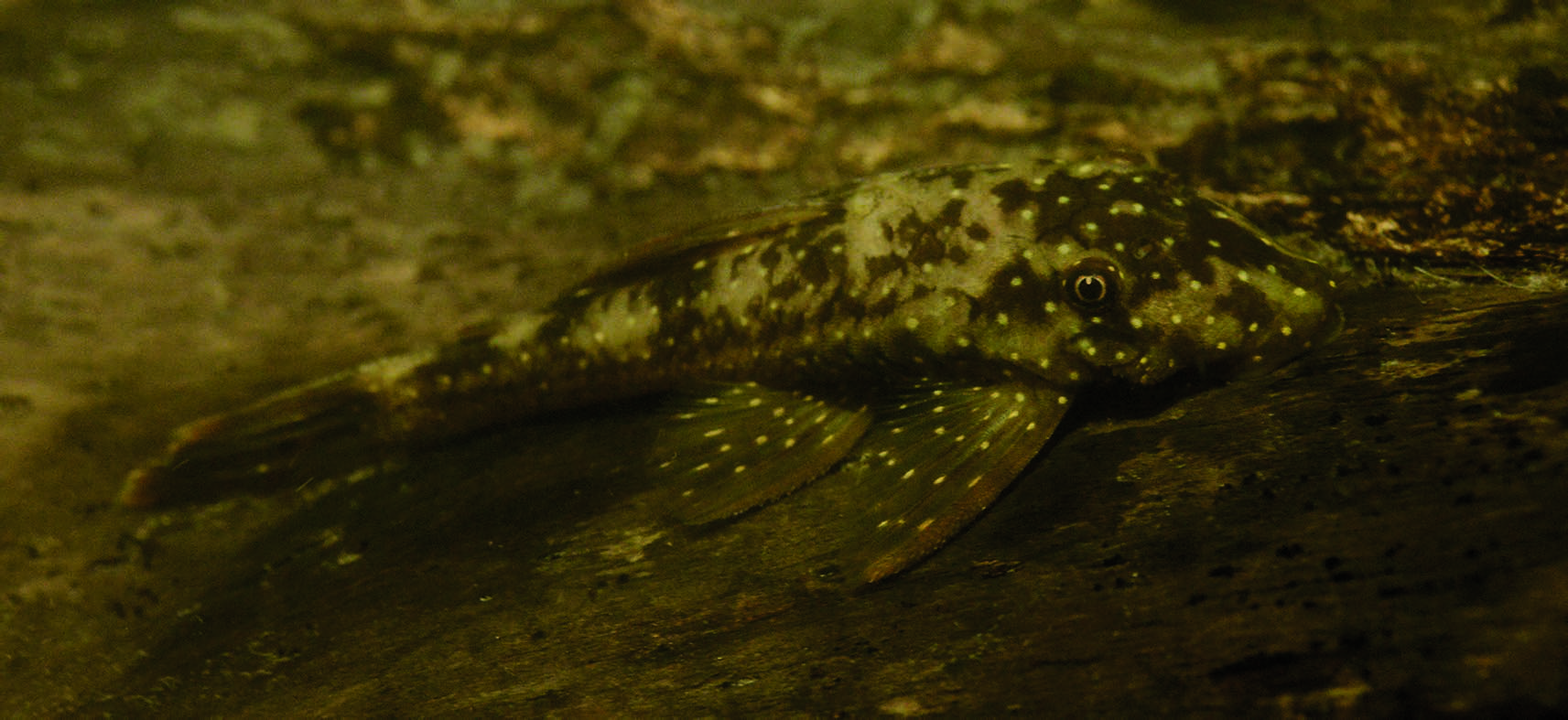

Scientific classification
- Kingdom: Animalia
- Phylum: Chordata
- Class: Actinopterygii
- Division: Teleostei
- Order: Siluriformes
- Family: Loricariidae
- Genus: Ancistrus
- Species: A. temminckii

Binomial name
- Ancistrus temminckii (Valenciennes, 1840)

Synonyms
- Hypostomus temminckii Valenciennes, 1840; Plecostomus aculeatus Gronow, 1854

= Ancistrus temminckii =

Species of fish

Ancistrus temminckii is a species of freshwater ray-finned fish belonging to the family Loricariidae, the suckermouth armoured catfishes, and the subfamily Hypostominae, the suckermouth catfishes. This catfish is found in the Guianas.

== Taxonomy ==
Ancistrus temminckii was first formally described as Hypostomus temminckii by the French zoologist Achille Valenciennes in volume 15 of Histoire naturelle des poissons with its type locality given as Suriname. Eschmeyer's Catalog of Fishes classifies the genus Ancistrus in the subfamily Hypostominae, the suckermouth catfishes, within the suckermouth armored catfish family Loricariidae. It has also been classified in the tribe Ancistrini by some authorities.

== Etymology ==
Ancistrus temminckii is classified in the genus Ancistrus, a name coined by Rudolf Kner, but when he proposed the genus he did not explain the etymology of the name. It is thought to be from the Greek ágkistron, meaning a "fish hook" or the "hook of a spindle", a reference to the hooked odontodes on the interopercular bone. The specific name, temminckii, honours the Dutch zoologist Coenraad Jacob Temminck, who was director of the Rijksmuseum van Natuurlijke Historie in Leiden, and who provided Valenciennes with the holotype.

== Description ==
Ancistrus temminckii reaches a standard length of 9.84 cm (3.87 in). Ancistrus species develop soft, bushy tentacles on the snout when sexually mature; these are better developed in the males than they are in females. This species has a wide, naked edge to the snout, the raisable odontodes on the interopecular are hook like and the tentacles on the snouts of males are forked. The body is marked with clear bright orange spots.

== Distribution and habit ==
Ancistrus temminckii is found in the Saramacca River and Maroni river basins in Suriname and French Guiana. It has been introduced to streams on the island of Oʻahu in Hawaii. These fishes are found in small to medium-sized forest streams with a moderate current and a sandy or rocky substrate.
