= Ancistrus latifrons =

Conservation status
- Least Concern (IUCN 3.1)

Scientific classification
- Kingdom: Animalia
- Phylum: Chordata
- Class: Actinopterygii
- Order: Siluriformes
- Family: Loricariidae
- Genus: Ancistrus
- Species: A. latifrons

Binomial name
- Ancistrus latifrons (Günther, 1869)

Synonyms
- Chaetostomus latifrons Günther, 1869

Species of catfish

Ancistrus latifrons is a species of freshwater ray-finned fish belonging to the family Loricariidae, the suckermouth armoured catfishes, and the subfamily Hypostominae, the suckermouth catfishes. This catfish is found in South America.

== Taxonomy ==
Ancistrus latifrons was first formally described as Chaetostomus latifrons in 1869 by the German-born British herpetologist and ichthyologist Albert Günther, with its type locality given as the upper Amazon River in Peru. Eschmeyer's Catalog of Fishes classified the genus Ancistrus in the subfamily Hypostominae, the suckermouth catfishes, within the suckermouth armored catfish family Loricariidae. It has also been classified in the tribe Ancistrini by some authorities.

== Etymology ==
Ancistrus latifrons is classified in the genus Ancistrus, a name coined by Rudolf Kner, but when he proposed the genus he did not explain the etymology of the name. It is thought to be from the Greek ágkistron, meaning a "fish hook" or the "hook of a spindle", a reference to the hooked odontodes on the interopercular bone. The specific name, latifrons, combines latus, meaning "wide" or "broad", with frons, which means "forehead", an allusion to the wide interorbital space.

== Description ==
Ancistrus latifrons reaches a standard length of 15.4 cm (6.1 in). Ancistrus species develop soft, bushy tentacles on the snout when sexually mature, these are better developed in the males than they are in females. This catfish has wide interopercular space, for which it is named.

== Distribution ==
Ancistrus latifrons is found the upper Amazon basin in Ecuador and Peru, and the upper Solimões River in Brazil.
