= Ancistrus cuiabae =

Conservation status
- Least Concern (IUCN 3.1)

Scientific classification
- Kingdom: Animalia
- Phylum: Chordata
- Class: Actinopterygii
- Division: Teleostei
- Order: Siluriformes
- Family: Loricariidae
- Genus: Ancistrus
- Species: A. cuiabae

Binomial name
- Ancistrus cuiabae Knaack, 1999

Species of catfish

Ancistrus cuiabae is a species of freshwater ray-finned fish belonging to the family Loricariidae, the suckermouth armoured catfishes, and the subfamily Hypostominae, the suckermouth catfishes. This catfish is endemic to Brazil.

== Taxonomy ==
Ancistrus cuiabae was first formally described in 1999 by the German ichthyologist and aquarist Joachim Knaack with its type locality given as the Pantanal, 36 km (22 mi) southeast of Poconé, in a permanent pool of the Bento Gomes River in the Brazilian state of Mato Grosso. Eschmeyer's Catalog of Fishes classified the genus Ancistrus in the subfamily Hypostominae, the suckermouth catfishes, within the suckermouth armored catfish family Loricariidae. It has also been classified in the tribe Ancistrini by some authorities.

== Etymology ==
Ancistrus cuiabae is classified in the genus Ancistrus, a name coined by Rudolf Kner when he proposed the genus but Kner did not explain the etymology of the name. It is thought to be from the Greek ágkistron, meaning a "fish hook" or the "hook of a spindle", a reference to the hooked odontodes on the interopercular bone. The specific name, cuiabae, is a reference to the Cuiabá River basin, the basin this species is endemic to.

== Description ==
Ancistrus cuiabae reaches a standard length of 11.5 cm (4.5 in). Ancistrus species develop soft, bushy tentacles on the snout when sexually mature, these are better developed in the males than they are in females.

== Distribution and habit ==
Ancistrus cuiabae was formerly thought to be restricted to the Cuiabá River basin, in the upper portion of the Paraguay River drainage in Brazil, being considered to be endemic to the Pantanal region near Poconé. However, this species has also been recorded in the Miranda River system thus A. cuiabae is endemic to the upper Paraguay River system rather than only the Cuiabá system. A. cuiabae occurs in areas of turbid water, which develops a greenish coloration in the dry season as the nutrients concentrate, where there is a muddy substrate and depths ranging from 0.5 to 1.5 m (1 ft 8 in to 4 ft 11 in). It lives under the trunks and branches of submerged trees and in rocks, in environments with low or no current.

== Utilisation ==
Ancistrus cuiabae appears in the aquarium trade.
