= Ancistrus sericeus =

Conservation status
- Least Concern (IUCN 3.1)

Scientific classification
- Kingdom: Animalia
- Phylum: Chordata
- Class: Actinopterygii
- Division: Teleostei
- Order: Siluriformes
- Family: Loricariidae
- Genus: Ancistrus
- Species: A. sericeus

Binomial name
- Ancistrus sericeus (Cope, 1872)

Synonyms
- Chaetostomus sericeus Cope, 1872; Chaetostoma sericeum Cope, 1872

Species of fish

Ancistrus sericeus is a species of freshwater ray-finned fish belonging to the family Loricariidae, the suckermouth armoured catfishes, and the subfamily Hypostominae, the suckermouth catfishes. This catfish is endemic to Peru.

== Taxonomy ==
Ancistrus sericeus was first formally described in 1872 by the American paleontologist and ichthyologist Edward Drinker Cope, with its type locality given as the Ambyiacu River in Peru. Eschmeyer's Catalog of Fishes classified the genus Ancistrus in the subfamily Hypostominae, the suckermouth catfishes, within the suckermouth armored catfish family Loricariidae. It has also been classified in the tribe Ancistrini by some authorities.

== Etymology ==
Ancistrus sericeus is classified in the genus Ancistrus, a name coined by Rudolf Kner, but when he proposed the genus he did not explain the etymology of the name. It is thought to be from the Greek ágkistron, meaning a "fish hook" or the "hook of a spindle", a reference to the hooked odontodes on the interopercular bone. The specific name, sericeus, means "silky" or "silken". Cope did not explain his choice of name, nor is it evident.

== Description ==
Ancistrus sericeus reaches a standard length of 5 cm (2.0 in). Ancistrus species develop soft, bushy tentacles on the snout when sexually mature; these are better developed in the males than they are in females.

== Distribution and habitat ==
Ancistrus sericeus is endemic to Peru, where it is found in the Amazon basin. This species is a benthic species which is found in white and clear waters.

== Conservation status ==
Ancistrus sericeus is classified as Least Concern by the International Union for Conservation of Nature, because although it has a small range, it mostly lies within a protected area, and there are no known threats to this species.
