= Ancistrus trinitatis =

Conservation status
- Near Threatened (IUCN 3.1)

Scientific classification
- Kingdom: Animalia
- Phylum: Chordata
- Class: Actinopterygii
- Division: Teleostei
- Order: Siluriformes
- Family: Loricariidae
- Genus: Ancistrus
- Species: A. trinitatis

Binomial name
- Ancistrus trinitatis (Günther, 1864)

Synonyms
- Chaetostoma trinitatis Günther, 1964; Chaetostomus trinitatis Günther, 1964; Guyanancistrus trinitatis (Günther, 1964); Lasiancistrus trinitatis (Günther, 1964); Ancistrus maracasae Fowler, 1946

Dubious species of catfish

Ancistrus trinitatis is a species of freshwater ray-finned fish belonging to the family Loricariidae, the suckermouth armoured catfishes, and the subfamily Hypostominae, the suckermouth catfishes. This catfish is endemic to Trinidad & Tobago.

== Taxonomy ==
Ancistrus trinitatis was first formally described as Chaetostomus trinitatis, although the correct spelling of the genus name was Chaetostoma, in 1864 by the German-born British herpetologist and ichthyologist Albert Günther, with its type locality given as the Maracas River on Trinidad in the West Indies. This taxon has been regarded as being of dubious validity, as Theodore Gill referred to the type material in 1858 as Ancistrus guacharote (a species now referred to as Lasiancistrus guacharote) and it was described by Günther in 1864 as Chaetostomus trinitatis, but neither description is considered sufficient to determine the validity and identity of the taxon. While the original locality of the type material was listed as Puerto Rico, this was determined to be in error and the material was determined to have actually originated from the Maracaibo Basin of Venezuela. In 1946, Henry Weed Fowler described the species Ancistrus maracasae from Trinidad (which is the only confirmed loricariid species native to the island, aside from Hypostomus robinii, which is not known to have been taxonomically confused with any Ancistrus species), and in 2019, Lesley S. de Souza, Donald C. Taphorn, and Jonathan W. Armbruster determined that A. maracasae and A. trinitatis are synonymous, designating the holotype of A. maracasae as the neotype of A. trinitatis. Eschmeyer's Catalog of Fishes treates A. trinitatis as a valid species, within the genus Ancistrus which it classifies in the subfamily Hypostominae, the suckermouth catfishes, within the suckermouth armored catfish family Loricariidae. It has also been classified in the tribe Ancistrini by some authorities.

== Etymology ==
Ancistrus trinitatis is classified in the genus Ancistrus, a name coined by Rudolf Kner, but when he proposed the genus he did not explain the etymology of the name. It is thought to be from the Greek ágkistron, meaning a "fish hook" or the "hook of a spindle", a reference to the hooked odontodes on the interopercular bone. The specific name, trinitatis, means of Trinidad, where this species is endemic.

== Description ==
Ancistrus trinitatis may be distinguished from other Ancistrus catfishes in northern South America in the possession of large, irregular, pale spots on the dorsal and caudal fins, black spots on the base of the caudal fin rays and white spots towards the tips, these spots typically smaller and forming rows while the dorsal fin rays have no spots. The neotype had a standard length of 82 mm (3.2 in).

== Distribution and habitat ==
Ancistrus trinitatis is endemic to the island of Trinidad where it is only found in its northwestern corner. Here it can be found in a variety of habitats from fast flowing clearwater streams to murky, stagnant water.
