= Ancistrus damasceni =

Conservation status
- Least Concern (IUCN 3.1)

Scientific classification
- Kingdom: Animalia
- Phylum: Chordata
- Class: Actinopterygii
- Order: Siluriformes
- Family: Loricariidae
- Genus: Ancistrus
- Species: A. damasceni

Binomial name
- Ancistrus damasceni (Steindachner, 1907)

Synonyms
- Xenocara damasceni Steindachner, 1907

Species of catfish

Ancistrus damasceni is a species of freshwater ray-finned fish belonging to the family Loricariidae, the suckermouth armoured catfishes, and the subfamily Hypostominae, the suckermouth catfishes. This catfish is endemic to Brazil.

== Taxonomy ==
Ancistrus damasceni was first formally described in 1907 by the Austrian ichthyologist Franz Steindachner with its type locality given as the Parnahyba River near Victoria and Filomena. Eschmeyer's Catalog of Fishes classified the genus Ancistrus in the subfamily Hypostominae, the suckermouth catfishes, within the suckermouth armored catfish family Loricariidae. It has also been classified in the tribe Ancistrini by some authorities.

== Etymology ==
Ancistrus damasceni is classified in the genus Ancistrus, a name coined by Rudolf Kner when he proposed the genus but Kner did not explain the etymology of the name. It is thought to be from the Greek ágkistron, meaning a "fish hook" or the "hook of a spindle", a reference to the hooked odontodes on the interopercular bone. The specific name, damasceni, was not explained by Steindachner but while he was in Santa Filimeno, near the type locality, he was hosted by Colonel José Damasceno Nogueira who the name almost certainly honours.

== Description ==
Ancistrus damasceni reaches a standard length of 6.5 cm (2.6 in). Ancistrus species develop soft, bushy tentacles on the snout when sexually mature, these are better developed in the males than they are in females.

== Distribution and habit ==
Ancistrus damasceni is endemic to Brazil where it is found in the upper Parnaiba River basin in the Brazilian State of Piauí. There is very little information about the biology and ecology of this species.
