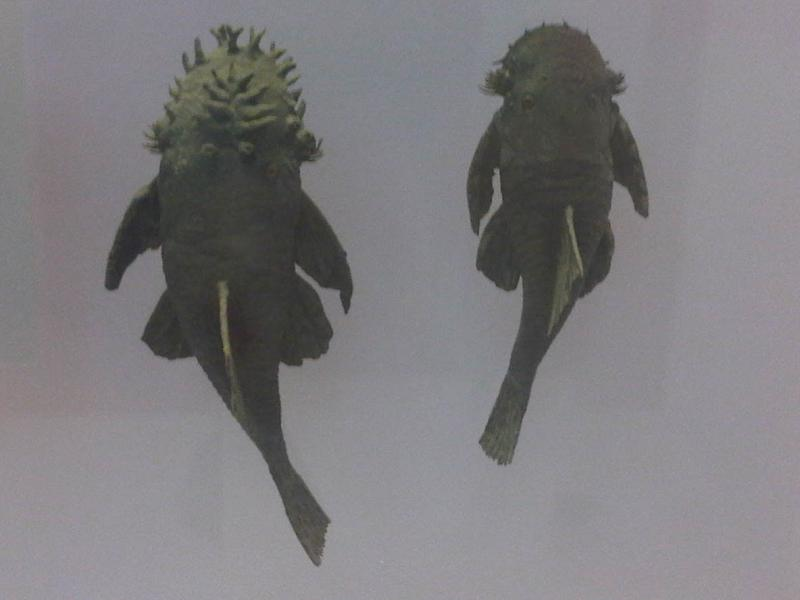

Conservation status
- Data Deficient (IUCN 3.1)

Scientific classification
- Kingdom: Animalia
- Phylum: Chordata
- Class: Actinopterygii
- Order: Siluriformes
- Family: Loricariidae
- Genus: Ancistrus
- Species: A. stigmaticus

Binomial name
- Ancistrus stigmaticus C. H. Eigenmann & R. S. Eigenmann, 1889

= Ancistrus stigmaticus =

Species of fish

Ancistrus stigmaticus is a species of freshwater ray-finned fish belonging to the family Loricariidae, the suckermouth armoured catfishes, and the subfamily Hypostominae, the suckermouth catfishes. This catfish is endemic to Brazil.

== Taxonomy ==
Ancistrus stigmaticus was first formally described in 1889 by the ichthyologists Carl H. Eigenmann and Rosa Smith Eigenmann with its type locality given as São Mateus in the Brazilian state of Espirito Santo and the state of Goiás. Eschmeyer's Catalog of Fishes classified the genus Ancistrus in the subfamily Hypostominae, the suckermouth catfishes, within the suckermouth armored catfish family Loricariidae. It has also been classified in the tribe Ancistrini by some authorities.

== Etymology ==
Ancistrus stigmaticus is classified in the genus Ancistrus, a name coined by Rudolf Kner, but when he proposed the genus he did not explain the etymology of the name. It is thought to be from the Greek ágkistron, meaning a "fish hook" or the "hook of a spindle", a reference to the hooked odontodes on the interopercular bone. The specific name, stigmaticus, means "branded" or "marked", thought to be an allusion to either the dark brown body being densely spotted with pale spots or the dark fins having irregular pale spots.

== Description ==
Ancistrus stigmaticus reaches a standard length of 15.2 cm (6.0 in). Ancistrus species develop soft, bushy tentacles on the snout when sexually mature, these are better developed in the males than they are in females. This species has a dark brown body which has a desne covering of plae spots while the dark fins are marked with irregular pale spots.

== Distribution ==
Ancistrus stigmaticus is endemic to Brazil where it is only known from the Vermelho River, a tributary of the Araguaia River, in the state of Goiás. The paralectotype from Espirito Santo does not appear to be the same taxon as the lectotype.

== Conservation status ==
Ancistrus stigmaticus is classified as Data Deficient by the International Union for Conservation of Nature because there is a lack of information on its current distribution, biology and population, as well as the difficulty of taxonomic identification of most species of the genus.
