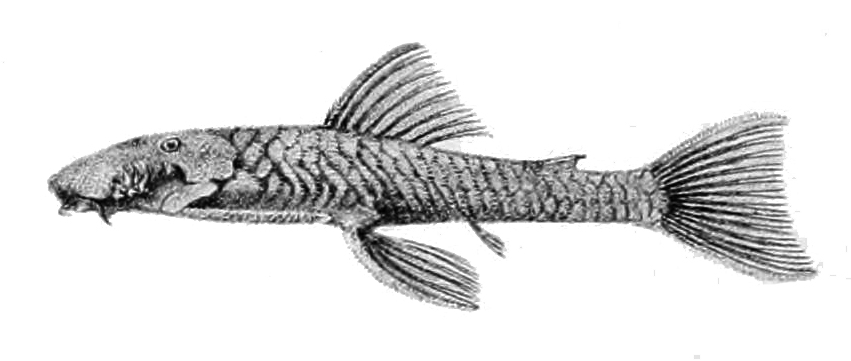

Conservation status
- Data Deficient (IUCN 3.1)

Scientific classification
- Kingdom: Animalia
- Phylum: Chordata
- Class: Actinopterygii
- Division: Teleostei
- Order: Siluriformes
- Family: Loricariidae
- Genus: Ancistrus
- Species: A. greeni

Binomial name
- Ancistrus greeni (Isbrücker, 2001)

Synonyms
- Chaetostoma greeni Isbrücker in Isbrücker et al., 2001; Chaetostoma maculatum Regan, 1904; Chaetostomus maculatus Regan, 1904

= Ancistrus greeni =

Species of catfish

Ancistrus greeni is a species of freshwater ray-finned fish belonging to the family Loricariidae, the suckermouth armoured catfishes, and the subfamily Hypostominae, the suckermouth catfishes. This catfish is probably endemic to Peru.

== Taxonomy ==
Ancistrus greeni was originally described as Chaetostoma maculatum by the British ichthyologist Charles Tate Regan with its type locality given as Rozmaiu in Peru. Regan's name was preoccupied by Chaetostomus (Ancistrus) cirrhosus var. maculata described by Franz Steindachner in 1881. In 2001 Isaac J. H. Isbrücker proposed the replacement name Ancistrus greeni. Eschmeyer's Catalog of Fishes classified the genus Ancistrus in the subfamily Hypostominae, the suckermouth catfishes, within the suckermouth armoured catfish family Loricariidae. It has also been classified in the tribe Ancistrini by some authorities.

== Etymology ==
Ancistrus greeni is classified in the genus Ancistrus, a name coined by Rudolf Kner when he proposed the genus but Kner did not explain the etymology of the name. It is thought to be from the Greek ágkistron, meaning a "fish hook" or the "hook of a spindle", a reference to the hooked odontodes on the interopercular bone. The specific name, greeni, honours the artist artist J. Green, who illustrated Regan’s 1904 monograph of the family Loricariidae.

== Description ==
Ancistrus greeni reaches a total length of 6.5 cm (2.6 in). Ancistrus species develop soft, bushy tentacles on the snout when sexually mature, these are better developed in the males than they are in females.

== Distribution ==
Ancistrus greeni is known only from its type locality, "Rozmaiu, Upper Peru", a location which is uncertain but which is probably in Peru.

== Conservation status ==
Ancistrus greeni is known only from its type locality is classified by the International Union for Conservation of Nature as Data Deficient because the type locality is uncertaina nd there is no information on its population range, threats or biology.
