= Ancistrus lithurgicus =

Conservation status
- Least Concern (IUCN 3.1)

Scientific classification
- Kingdom: Animalia
- Phylum: Chordata
- Class: Actinopterygii
- Order: Siluriformes
- Family: Loricariidae
- Genus: Ancistrus
- Species: A. lithurgicus

Binomial name
- Ancistrus lithurgicus C. H. Eigenmann, 1912

Species of catfish

Ancistrus lithurgicus is a species of freshwater ray-finned fish belonging to the family Loricariidae, the suckermouth armoured catfishes, and the subfamily Hypostominae, the suckermouth catfishes. This catfish is endemic to Guyana.

== Taxonomy ==
Ancistrus lithurgicus was first formally described in 1912 by the German-American ichthyologist Carl H. Eigenmann, with its type locality given as Crab Falls, Essequibo River, Guyana, at roughly 5.403128, -58.820068. Eschmeyer's Catalog of Fishes classified the genus Ancistrus in the subfamily Hypostominae, the suckermouth catfishes, within the suckermouth armored catfish family Loricariidae. It has also been classified in the tribe Ancistrini by some authorities.

== Etymology ==
Ancistrus lithurgicus is classified in the genus Ancistrus, a name coined by Rudolf Kner, but when he proposed the genus he did not explain the etymology of the name. It is thought to be from the Greek ágkistron, meaning a "fish hook" or the "hook of a spindle", a reference to the hooked odontodes on the interopercular bone. The specific name, lithurgicus, is an adjective derived from the Latin lithurgus, meaning a "stoneworker", an allusion Eigenmann did not explain, bit it may be an allusion to the type locality being a waterfall, the catfish possibly using its suckermouth to cling to rocks in the falls.

== Description ==
Ancistrus lithurgicus can be told apart from other Guianan shield Ancistrusspecies, by having a very flattened body and eyes placed high on the head. It is black in colour with white or gold spots and does not have any saddle marks across its back. Ancistrus species develop soft, bushy tentacles on the snout when sexually mature, these are better developed in the males than they are in females. This catfish reaches a standard length of 13.2 cm (5.2 in).

== Distribution and habitat ==
Ancistrus lithurgicus is endemic to Guyana where it occurs in the Essequibo River and the Berbice River. It is a highly flattened specuies which lives in rapids.
