= Ancistrus megalostomus =

Conservation status
- Least Concern (IUCN 3.1)

Scientific classification
- Kingdom: Animalia
- Phylum: Chordata
- Class: Actinopterygii
- Order: Siluriformes
- Family: Loricariidae
- Genus: Ancistrus
- Species: A. megalostomus

Binomial name
- Ancistrus megalostomus Pearson, 1924

Species of catfish

Ancistrus megalostomus is a species of freshwater ray-finned fish belonging to the family Loricariidae, the suckermouth armoured catfishes, and the subfamily Hypostominae, the suckermouth catfishes. This catfish is found in Bolivia and Peru.

== Taxonomy ==
Ancistrus megalostomus was first formally described in 1924 by the American ichthyologist Nathan Everett Pearson, with its type locality given as the Huachi, at the confluence of the Bopi and Cochabamba rivers in Bolivia, at an elevation of 2,235 ft (681 m). Eschmeyer's Catalog of Fishes classified the genus Ancistrus in the subfamily Hypostominae, the suckermouth catfishes, within the suckermouth armored catfish family Loricariidae. It has also been classified in the tribe Ancistrini by some authorities.

== Etymology ==
Ancistrus megalostomus is classified in the genus Ancistrus, a name coined by Rudolf Kner, but when he proposed the genus he did not explain the etymology of the name. It is thought to be from the Greek ágkistron, meaning a "fish hook" or the "hook of a spindle", a reference to the hooked odontodes on the interopercular bone. The specific name, megalostomus, means "lareg-mouthed", an allusion to the large mandibular ramus of this catfish in comparison with related species.

== Description ==
Ancistrus megalostomus reaches a standard length of 8.3 cm (3.3 in). Ancistrus species develop soft, bushy tentacles on the snout when sexually mature, these are better developed in the males than they are in females.

== Distribution ==
Ancistrus megalostomus is found in South America where it occurs in the Madre de Dios River basin in Peru and Bolivia, and in the Beni and Mamoré River basins in Bolivia. This catfish lived in river and streams with fast currents.
