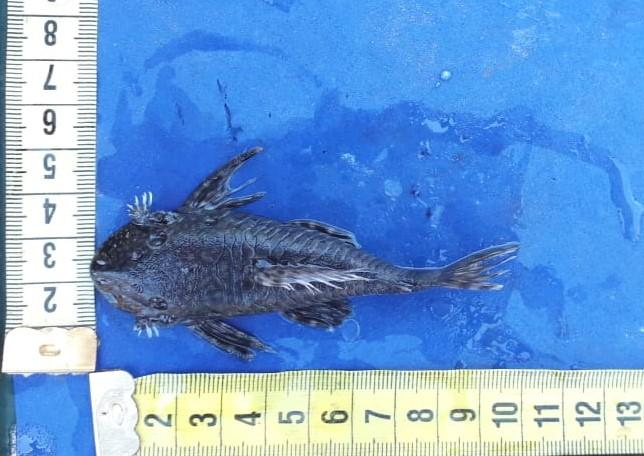

Conservation status
- Least Concern (IUCN 3.1)

Scientific classification
- Kingdom: Animalia
- Phylum: Chordata
- Class: Actinopterygii
- Order: Siluriformes
- Family: Loricariidae
- Genus: Ancistrus
- Species: A. taunayi

Binomial name
- Ancistrus taunayi A. Miranda-Ribeiro, 1918

= Ancistrus taunayi =

Species of catfish

Ancistrus taunayi is a species of freshwater ray-finned fish belonging to the family Loricariidae, the suckermouth armoured catfishes, and the subfamily Hypostominae, the suckermouth catfishes. This catfish is found in southeastern South America.

== Taxonomy ==
Ancistrus taunayi was first formally described in 1918 by the Brazilian zoologist Alipio de Miranda Ribeiro with its type locality given as the Lageado River at Itaqui, in the Brazilian state of Rio Grande do Sul. Eschmeyer's Catalog of Fishes classifies the genus Ancistrus in the subfamily Hypostominae, the suckermouth catfishes, within the suckermouth armored catfish family Loricariidae. It has also been classified in the tribe Ancistrini by some authorities.

== Etymology ==
Ancistrus taunayi is classified in the genus Ancistrus, a name coined by Rudolf Kner, but when he proposed the genus he did not explain the etymology of the name. It is thought to be from the Greek ágkistron, meaning a "fish hook" or the "hook of a spindle", a reference to the hooked odontodes on the interopercular bone. The specific name, tauneyi, honours the Brazilian historian and novelist Afonso d'Escragnolle Taunay, who was director of the director of Museu Paulista.

== Description ==
Ancistrus tauneyi reaches a standard length of 14 cm (5.5 in). Ancistrus species develop soft, bushy tentacles on the snout when sexually mature, these are better developed in the males than they are in females.

== Distribution and habitat ==
Ancistrus tauneyi is endemic to Uruguay River basin in Argentina, Brazil and Uruguay. There is no information about the biolgy of this species.
