= Ancistrus piriformis =

Conservation status
- Least Concern (IUCN 3.1)

Scientific classification
- Kingdom: Animalia
- Phylum: Chordata
- Class: Actinopterygii
- Order: Siluriformes
- Family: Loricariidae
- Genus: Ancistrus
- Species: A. piriformis

Binomial name
- Ancistrus piriformis Muller, 1989

Species of catfish

Ancistrus piriformis is a species of freshwater ray-finned fish belonging to the family Loricariidae, the suckermouth armoured catfishes, and the subfamily Hypostominae, the suckermouth catfishes. This catfish is found in Argentina and Paraguay.

== Taxonomy ==
Ancistrus piriformis was first formally described in 1989 by the Swiss ichthyologist Sonia Fisch-Muller, with its type locality given as the Acaray River, above the lake behind the dam, at 25°23'S, 54°42'W, Alto Paraná, Paraguay. Eschmeyer's Catalog of Fishes classified the genus Ancistrus in the subfamily Hypostominae, the suckermouth catfishes, within the suckermouth armored catfish family Loricariidae. It has also been classified in the tribe Ancistrini by some authorities.

== Etymology ==
Ancistrus piriformis is classified in the genus Ancistrus, a name coined by Rudolf Kner, but when he proposed the genus he did not explain the etymology of the name. It is thought to be from the Greek ágkistron, meaning a "fish hook" or the "hook of a spindle", a reference to the hooked odontodes on the interopercular bone. The specific name, piriformis, means "pear-shaped", a reference to characteristic pear shape of this fish.

== Description ==
Ancistrus piriformis reaches a standard length of 8.3 cm (3.3 in). Ancistrus species develop soft, bushy tentacles on the snout when sexually mature, these are better developed in the males than they are in females.

== Distribution and habitat ==
Ancistrus piriformis is found in Bolivia and Argentina in the Acaray River basin in the middle Paraná River drainage. This catfish is demersal and occurs in streams and rivers with a rocky substrate.
