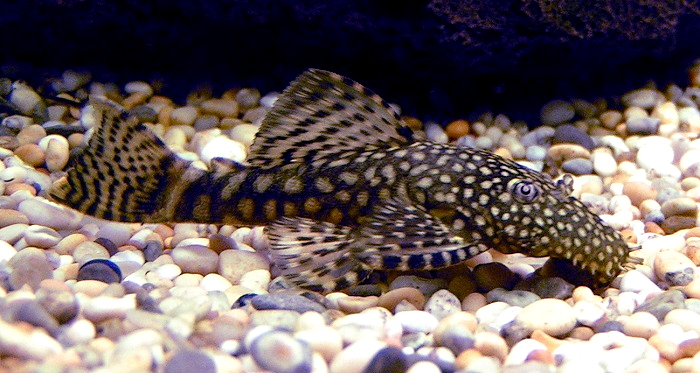

Conservation status
- Least Concern (IUCN 3.1)

Scientific classification
- Kingdom: Animalia
- Phylum: Chordata
- Class: Actinopterygii
- Division: Teleostei
- Order: Siluriformes
- Family: Loricariidae
- Genus: Ancistrus
- Species: A. triradiatus

Binomial name
- Ancistrus triradiatus C. H. Eigenmann, 1918

= Ancistrus triradiatus =

Species of catfish

Ancistrus triradiatus is a species of freshwater ray-finned fish belonging to the family Loricariidae, the suckermouth armoured catfishes, and the subfamily Hypostominae, the suckermouth catfishes. This catfish is found in northern South America.

== Taxonomy ==
Ancistrus triradiatus was first formally described in 1918 by the German-born American ichthyologist Carl H. Eigenmann, with its type locality given as the ravine of Cramalote, Barrigona and Villavicencio, upper Meta River drainage, Colombia. Eschmeyer's Catalog of Fishes classifies the genus Ancistrus in the subfamily Hypostominae, the suckermouth catfishes, within the suckermouth armored catfish family Loricariidae. It has also been classified in the tribe Ancistrini by some authorities.

== Etymology ==
Ancistrus triradiatus is classified in the genus Ancistrus, a name coined by Rudolf Kner, but when he proposed the genus he did not explain the etymology of the name. It is thought to be from the Greek ágkistron, meaning a "fish hook" or the "hook of a spindle", a reference to the hooked odontodes on the interopercular bone. The specific name, triradiatis, means "three-rayed", an allusion Eigenmann did not explain but may refer to the 3 soft rays in the anal fin.

== Description ==
Ancistrus triradiatus reaches a standard length of 9.2 cm (3.6 in). Ancistrus species develop soft, bushy tentacles on the snout when sexually mature, these are better developed in the males than they are in females.

== Distribution and habitat ==
Ancistrus triradiatus is found in northern South America in the Orinoco drainage system, as well as in river drainages flowing into the Caribbean Sea to the north of the Orinoco in Colombia and Venezuela. This species is found in pools and riffles, it is one of the deeper bodied Ancistrus catfishes which suggests that it can tolerate slower flows than some of its congeners.

== Utilisation ==
Ancistrus triradiatus sometimes appears in the aquarium trade, where it is known as the gold-spot or three-ray bristlenose pleco.
