= Ancistrus leucostictus =

Conservation status
- Least Concern (IUCN 3.1)

Scientific classification
- Kingdom: Animalia
- Phylum: Chordata
- Class: Actinopterygii
- Order: Siluriformes
- Family: Loricariidae
- Genus: Ancistrus
- Species: A. leucostictus

Binomial name
- Ancistrus leucostictus (Günther, 1864)

Synonyms
- Chaetostomus leucostictus Günther, 1864

Species of fish

Ancistrus leucostictus is a species of freshwater ray-finned fish belonging to the family Loricariidae, the suckermouth armoured catfishes, and the subfamily Hypostominae, the suckermouth catfishes. This catfish is, as far as is known, endemic to Guyana.

== Taxonomy ==
Ancistrus leucostictus was first formally described in 1864 by the ichthyologists Lesley S. de Souza, Donald Charles Taphorn Baechle and Jonathan W. Armbruster, with its type locality given as the Essequibo River in Guyana. Eschmeyer's Catalog of Fishes classified the genus Ancistrus in the subfamily Hypostominae, the suckermouth catfishes, within the suckermouth armored catfish family Loricariidae. It has also been classified in the tribe Ancistrini by some authorities.

== Etymology ==
Ancistrus leucostictus is classified in the genus Ancistrus, a name coined by Rudolf Kner, but when he proposed the genus he did not explain the etymology of the name. It is thought to be from the Greek ágkistron, meaning a "fish hook" or the "hook of a spindle", a reference to the hooked odontodes on the interopercular bone. The specific name, leucostictus, means "white-spotted", an allusion to the small white spots that cover the body and fins.

== Description ==
Ancistrus leucostictus has white spots that cover the body and fins. Ancistrus species develop soft, bushy tentacles on the snout when sexually mature, these are better developed in the males than they are in females. This catfish reaches a standard length of 5.5 cm (2.2 in).

== Distribution ==
Ancistrus leucostictus is known only from Guyana in the middle and upper Essequibo River, and Demerara-Berbice River system. It may occur in the Cuyuni River basin in Venezuela. It is associated with large boulders and flowing water.
