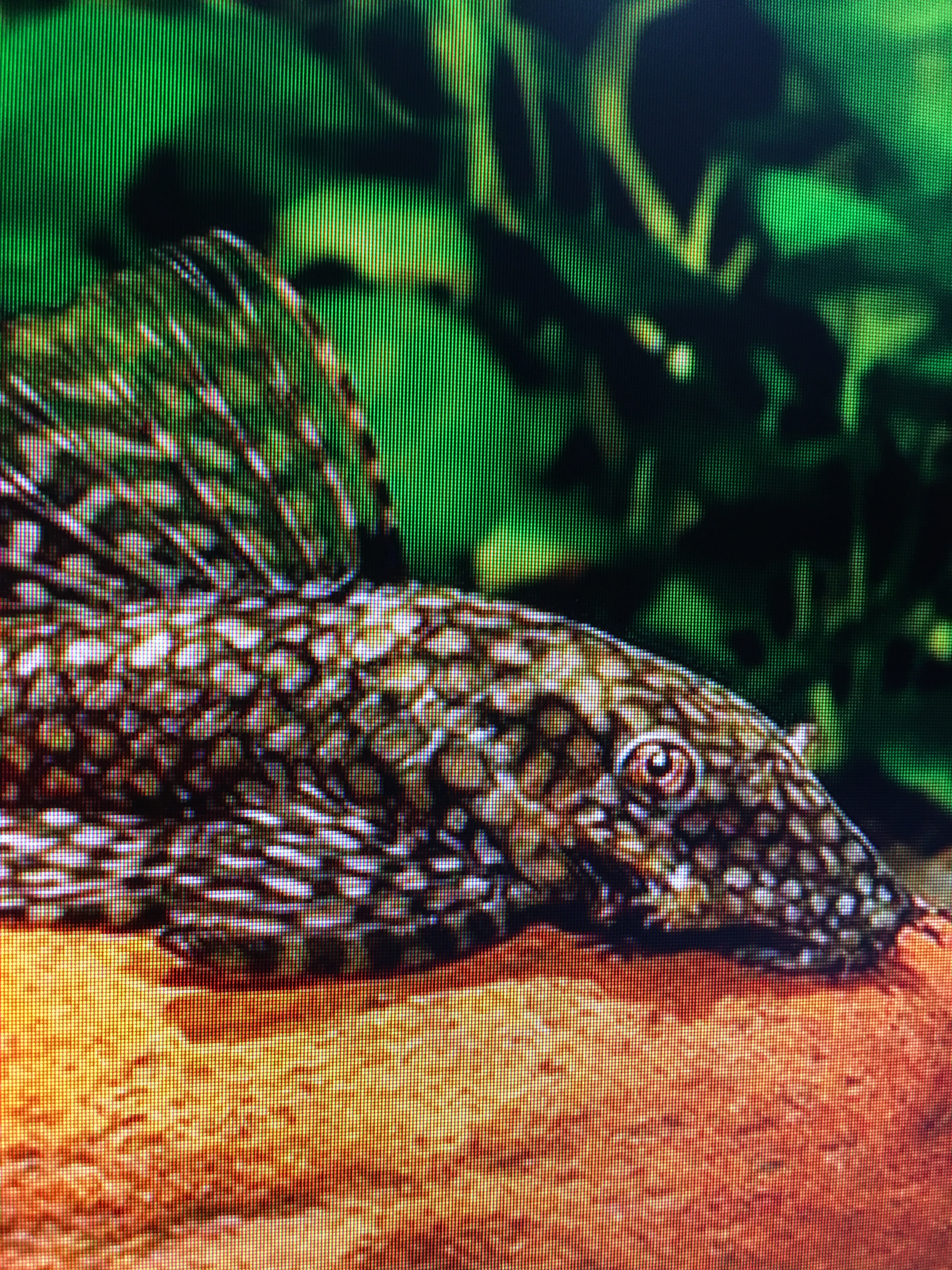

Conservation status
- Least Concern (IUCN 3.1)

Scientific classification
- Kingdom: Animalia
- Phylum: Chordata
- Class: Actinopterygii
- Order: Siluriformes
- Family: Loricariidae
- Genus: Ancistrus
- Species: A. tamboensis

Binomial name
- Ancistrus tamboensis Fowler, 1945

= Ancistrus tamboensis =

Species of catfish

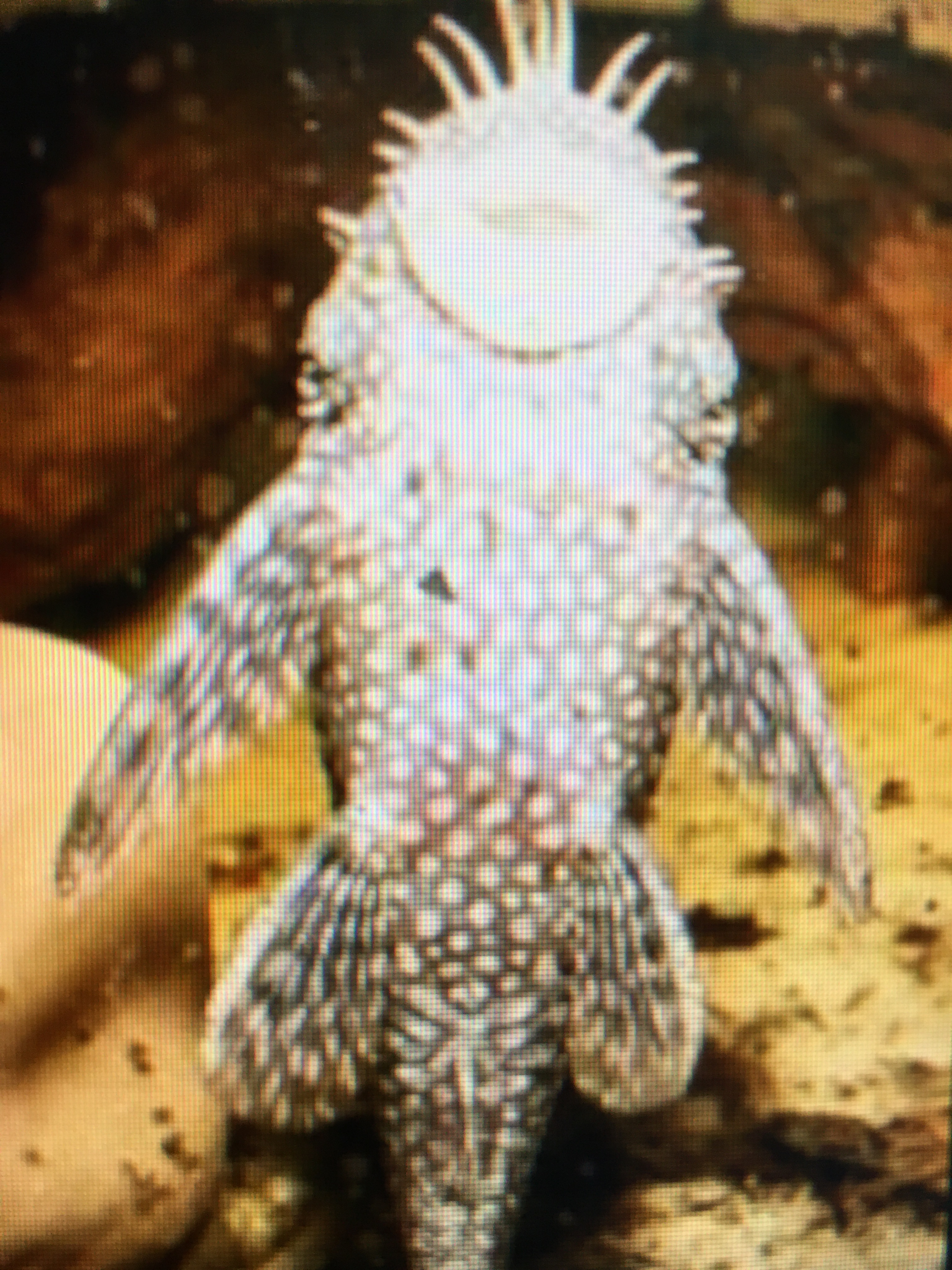
Ventral view of a specimen of Ancistrus tamboensis.

Ancistrus tamboensis is a species of freshwater ray-finned fish belonging to the family Loricariidae, the suckermouth armoured catfishes, and the subfamily Hypostominae, the suckermouth catfishes. This catfish is endemic to Peru.

== Taxonomy ==
Ancistrus tamboensis was first formally described in 1945 by the American zoologist Henry Weed Fowler with its type locality given as Satipo, in the upper Tambo River basin, Ucayali River drainage, Peru, from an elevation of 600 m (2,000 ft). Eschmeyer's Catalog of Fishes classified the genus Ancistrus in the subfamily Hypostominae, the suckermouth catfishes, within the suckermouth armored catfish family Loricariidae. It has also been classified in the tribe Ancistrini by some authorities.

== Etymology ==
Ancistrus tamboensis is classified in the genus Ancistrus, a name coined by Rudolf Kner, but when he proposed the genus he did not explain the etymology of the name. It is thought to be from the Greek ágkistron, meaning a "fish hook" or the "hook of a spindle", a reference to the hooked odontodes on the interopercular bone. The specific name, tamboensis, suffixes -ensis, meaning "of a place", onto Tambo, the name of the river system this species is endemic to.

== Description ==
Ancistrus tamboensis reaches a standard length of 8.2 cm (3.2 in). Ancistrus species develop soft, bushy tentacles on the snout when sexually mature, these are better developed in the males than they are in females.

== Distribution and habitat ==
Ancistrus tamboensis is endemic to Peru where known from the Upper Amazon basin. This is a benthic fish which lives in clear and white water on rocky, sandy or gravel substrates.

== Biology ==
Ancistrus tamboensis grazes on algae. In the genus Ancistrus the males guard the eggs and fry.
