= Ancistrus dubius =

Conservation status
- Least Concern (IUCN 3.1)

Scientific classification
- Kingdom: Animalia
- Phylum: Chordata
- Class: Actinopterygii
- Division: Teleostei
- Order: Siluriformes
- Family: Loricariidae
- Genus: Ancistrus
- Species: A. dubius

Binomial name
- Ancistrus dubius C. H. Eigenmann & R. S. Eigenmann, 1889

Synonyms
- Ancistrus cirrhosus dubius C. H. Eigenmann & R. S. Eigenamnn, 1889

Species of fish

Ancistrus dubius is a species of freshwater ray-finned fish belonging to the family Loricariidae, the suckermouth armoured catfishes, and the subfamily Hypostominae, the suckermouth catfishes. This catfish is endemic to Brazil.

== Taxonomy ==
Ancistrus dubius was first formally described as Ancistrus cirrhosus dubius in 1889 by the American ichthyologists Carl H. Eigenmann and Rosa Smith Eigenmann with its type locality given as Gurupá in the Brazilian state of Pará. Eschmeyer's Catalog of Fishes classified the genus Ancistrus in the subfamily Hypostominae, the suckermouth catfishes, within the suckermouth armored catfish family Loricariidae. It has also been classified in the tribe Ancistrini by some authorities.

== Etymology ==
Ancistrus dubius is classified in the genus Ancistrus, a name coined by Rudolf Kner when he proposed the genus but Kner did not explain the etymology of the name. It is thought to be from the Greek ágkistron, meaning a "fish hook" or the "hook of a spindle", a reference to the hooked odontodes on the interopercular bone. The specific name, dubius, means "uncertain" or "doubtful" in Latin, because the Eigenmanns were dubious about its validity of this as a species.

== Description ==
Ancistrus dubius reaches a standard length of 12.6 cm (5.0 in). Ancistrus species develop soft, bushy tentacles on the snout when sexually mature, these are better developed in the males than they are in females.

== Distribution and habit ==
Ancistrus dubius is found in the Amazon Basin where it has been recorded in the Tapajós, Xingu and Negro rivers, in Brazil, in the Madeira River, in Bolivia and Brazil, and in the area where the borders of Brazil, Peru and Colombia meet. This catfish lives in rivers but there is little information on it biology and ecology.
