= Ancistrus fulvus =

Conservation status
- Data Deficient (IUCN 3.1)

Scientific classification
- Kingdom: Animalia
- Phylum: Chordata
- Class: Actinopterygii
- Division: Teleostei
- Order: Siluriformes
- Family: Loricariidae
- Genus: Ancistrus
- Species: A. fulvus

Binomial name
- Ancistrus fulvus (Holly, 1929)

Synonyms
- Xenocara fulva Holly, 1929

Species of fish

Ancistrus fulvus is a species of freshwater ray-finned fish belonging to the family Loricariidae, the suckermouth armoured catfishes, and the subfamily Hypostominae, the suckermouth catfishes. This catfish is endemic to Brazil, although it is only known from its holotype.

== Taxonomy ==
Ancistrus fulvus was first formally described as Xenocara fulva by the Belgian ichthyologist Maximilian Holly, with its type locality given as the upper Acará River, a tributary of the Guamá River, south of Belém, in the Brazilian state of Pará. Eschmeyer's Catalog of Fishes classified the genus Ancistrus in the subfamily Hypostominae, the suckermouth catfishes, within the suckermouth armoured catfish family Loricariidae. It has also been classified in the tribe Ancistrini by some authorities.

== Etymology ==
Ancistrus fulvus is classified in the genus Ancistrus, a name coined by Rudolf Kner when he proposed the genus, but he did not explain the etymology of the name. It is thought to be from the Greek ágkistron, meaning a "fish hook" or the "hook of a spindle", a reference to the hooked odontodes on the interopercular bone. The specific name, fulvus, means "tawny" or "reddish-brown", an allusion to this fish being plain dark-brown in colour.

== Description ==
Ancistrus fulvus reaches a standard length of 8.8 cm (3.5 in). Ancistrus species develop soft, bushy tentacles on the snout when sexually mature. These are better developed in the males than they are in females.

== Distribution ==
Ancistrus fulvus is only known from its holotype, collected in 1920 from the Acará River, and there have been no records of this species since. The genus Ancistrus is taxonomically problematic, with a high degree of confusion between taxa.

== Conservation status ==
Ancistrus fulvus is only known from its holotype, and its genus has taxonomic issues. There is no information on the range of this species. This has led the International Union for Conservation of Nature to classify A. fulvus as Data Deficient.
