= Ancistrus claro =

Conservation status
- Least Concern (IUCN 3.1)

Scientific classification
- Kingdom: Animalia
- Phylum: Chordata
- Class: Actinopterygii
- Order: Siluriformes
- Family: Loricariidae
- Genus: Ancistrus
- Species: A. claro

Binomial name
- Ancistrus claro Knaack, 1999

Species of fish

Ancistrus claro is a species of freshwater ray-finned fish belonging to the family Loricariidae, the suckermouth armoured catfishes, and the subfamily Hypostominae, the suckermouth catfishes. This catfish is endemic to Colombia.

== Taxonomy ==
Ancistrus claro was first formally described in 1999 by the German ichthyologist and aquarist Joachim Knaack with its type locality given as the Claro River above the bridge, in the direction of Chapada dos Guimarães in the Brazilian state of Mato Grosso. Eschmeyer's Catalog of Fishes classified the genus Ancistrus in the subfamily Hypostominae, the suckermouth catfishes, within the suckermouth armored catfish family Loricariidae. It has also been classified in the tribe Ancistrini by some authorities.

== Etymology ==
Ancistrus claro is classified in the genus Ancistrus, a name coined by Rudolf Kner when he proposed the genus but Kner did not explain the etymology of the name. It is thought to be from the Greek ágkistron, meaning a "fish hook" or the "hook of a spindle", a reference to the hooked odontodes on the interopercular bone. The specific name, claro, is the name of the type locality, the Claro River in Mato Grosso.

== Description ==
Ancistrus claro reaches a standard length of 6.6 cm (2.6 in). Ancistrus species develop soft, bushy tentacles on the snout when sexually mature, these are better developed in the males than they are in females.

== Distribution and habit ==
Ancistrus caucanus is endemic to Brazil, in the Claro River basin, a tributary of the Cuiabá River, in the upper portion of the Paraguay River drainage in the state of Mato Grosso. It is a diurnal riverine species found both in fast rocky stretches of rapids and the areas of slower current between them.
