= Ancistrus abilhoai =

Conservation status
- Least Concern (IUCN 3.1)

Scientific classification
- Kingdom: Animalia
- Phylum: Chordata
- Class: Actinopterygii
- Order: Siluriformes
- Family: Loricariidae
- Genus: Ancistrus
- Species: A. abilhoai

Binomial name
- Ancistrus abilhoai Bifi, Pavanelli & Zawadzki, 2009

Species of fish

Ancistrus abilhoai is a species of freshwater ray-finned fish belonging to the family Loricariidae, the suckermouth armoured catfishes, and the subfamily Hypostominae, the suckermouth catfishes. This catfish is endemic to Brazil.

== Taxonomy ==
Ancistrus abilhoai was first formally described in 2009 by the Brazilian ichthyologists Alessandro Gasparetto Bifi, Carla Simone Pavanelli and Cláudio Henrique Zawadzki with its type locality given as Lapa in the middle Rio Iguaçu basin, at 25°47'35"S, 50°11'59"W, in the Brazilian state of Paraná. Eschmeyer's Catalog of Fishes classified the genus Ancistrus in the subfamily Hypostominae, the suckermouth catfishes, within the suckermouth armored catfish family Loricariidae. It has also been classified in the tribe Ancistrini by some authorities.

== Etymology ==
Ancistrus abilhoai is classified in the genus Ancistrus, a name coined by Rudolf Kner but when he proposed the genus Kner did not explain the etymology of the name. It is thought to be from the Greek ágkistron, meaning a "fish hook" or the "hook of a spindle", a reference to the hooked odontodes on the interopercular bone. The specific name, abilhoai, honours Vinícius Abilhoa, the curator of fishes, Museu de História Natural do Capão de Imbuia in Curitiba, who was the collector of some of the specimens which make up the type series, and who was of great assistance to the authors in their work on this fish and in other work.

== Description ==
Ancistrus abilhoai has its dorsal fin supported by a single spine and 7 soft rays while its anal fin also has a single spine but only 3 or 4 soft rays. This species has a short barbel on the maxilla that is not free from the lower lip. It has an elongated body shape and it reaches a standard length of 10.6 cm (4.2 in).

== Distribution and habitat ==
Ancistrus abilhoai is endemic to Brazil where it occurs in the states of Paraná and Santa Catarina in the basin of the Iguaçu River. Little is known about its biology or ecology.
