= Ancistrus chagresi =

Conservation status
- Least Concern (IUCN 3.1)

Scientific classification
- Kingdom: Animalia
- Phylum: Chordata
- Class: Actinopterygii
- Order: Siluriformes
- Family: Loricariidae
- Genus: Ancistrus
- Species: A. chagresi

Binomial name
- Ancistrus chagresi C. H. Eigenmann & R. S. Eigenmann, 1889

Species of fish

Ancistrus chagresi is a species of freshwater ray-finned fish belonging to the family Loricariidae, the suckermouth armoured catfishes, and the subfamily Hypostominae, the suckermouth catfishes. This catfish is endemic to Panama.

== Taxonomy ==
Ancistrus chagresi was first formally described in 1889 by the American ichthyologists Carl H. Eigenmann and Rosa Smith Eigenmann with its type locality given as the Chagres River, in the Panama Canal Zone, Panama. Eschmeyer's Catalog of Fishes classified the genus Ancistrus in the subfamily Hypostominae, the suckermouth catfishes, within the suckermouth armored catfish family Loricariidae. It has also been classified in the tribe Ancistrini by some authorities.

== Etymology ==
Ancistrus chagresi is classified in the genus Ancistrus, a name coined by Rudolf Kner when he proposed the genus but Kner did not explain the etymology of the name. It is thought to be from the Greek ágkistron, meaning a "fish hook" or the "hook of a spindle", a reference to the hooked odontodes on the interopercular bone. The specific name, chagresi, means "of the Rio Chagres", the type locality.

== Description ==
Ancistrus chagresi reaches a standard length of 19.5 cm (7.7 in). Ancistrus species develop soft, bushy tentacles on the snout when sexually mature, these are better developed in the males than they are in females. This species has white spots on its body and fins, the plates along the lateral line have moderately sized odontodes along their rear edges White spots on the tail are also diagnostic.

== Distribution and habit ==
Ancistrus caucanus is endemic to Panama where it is found from the Cocle del Norte system east to the Acla River at Guna Yala on the Atlantic slope, and from the Rio Caimito drainage to the Bayano River basin. This catfish is found in streams and riverst, here it is usually spends the day in crevices in deeper pools during the day, and moves into riffles to feed at night. It preferd waterways with riffles, runs, and pools, submerged tree roots and logs. Pebble substrate in riffles is used by juveniles for shelter, and adults move into deeper habitat to avoid being caught by birds.
