= Ancistrus malacops =

Conservation status
- Least Concern (IUCN 3.1)

Scientific classification
- Kingdom: Animalia
- Phylum: Chordata
- Class: Actinopterygii
- Order: Siluriformes
- Family: Loricariidae
- Genus: Ancistrus
- Species: A. malacops

Binomial name
- Ancistrus malacops (Cope, 1872)

Synonyms<erf anme = "Cof genus"/>
- Chaetostomus malacops Cope, 1872; Xenocara occidentalis Regan, 1904; Ancistrus occidentalis (Regan, 1904); Ancistrus lineolatus Fowler, 1943

Species of catfish

Ancistrus malacops is a species of freshwater ray-finned fish belonging to the family Loricariidae, the suckermouth armoured catfishes, and the subfamily Hypostominae, the suckermouth catfishes. This catfish is endemic to Peru.

== Taxonomy ==
Ancistrus malacops was first formally described in 1872 by the American paleontologist and ichthyologist Edward Drinker Cope, with its type locality given as the Ambyiacu River in Peru. Eschmeyer's Catalog of Fishes classified the genus Ancistrus in the subfamily Hypostominae, the suckermouth catfishes, within the suckermouth armored catfish family Loricariidae. It has also been classified in the tribe Ancistrini by some authorities.

== Etymology ==
Ancistrus malacops is classified in the genus Ancistrus, a name coined by Rudolf Kner, but when he proposed the genus he did not explain the etymology of the name. It is thought to be from the Greek ágkistron, meaning a "fish hook" or the "hook of a spindle", a reference to the hooked odontodes on the interopercular bone. The specific name, malacops, is a combination of malakos, which means "soft", and ops, meaning "eye" or "face", an allusion Cope did not explain but it may refer to the cheeks being naked, without plates.

== Description ==
Ancistrus malacops reaches a standard length of 7.7 cm (3.0 in). Ancistrus species develop soft, bushy tentacles on the snout when sexually mature, these are better developed in the males than they are in females.

== Distribution and habitat ==
Ancistrus malacops is found in the Amazon basin in Peru. This species is found in rivers with mixed, black and white waters, with a lot of woody debris and other organic matter, in shady waters within primary forest, where it is typically found in submerged logs.
