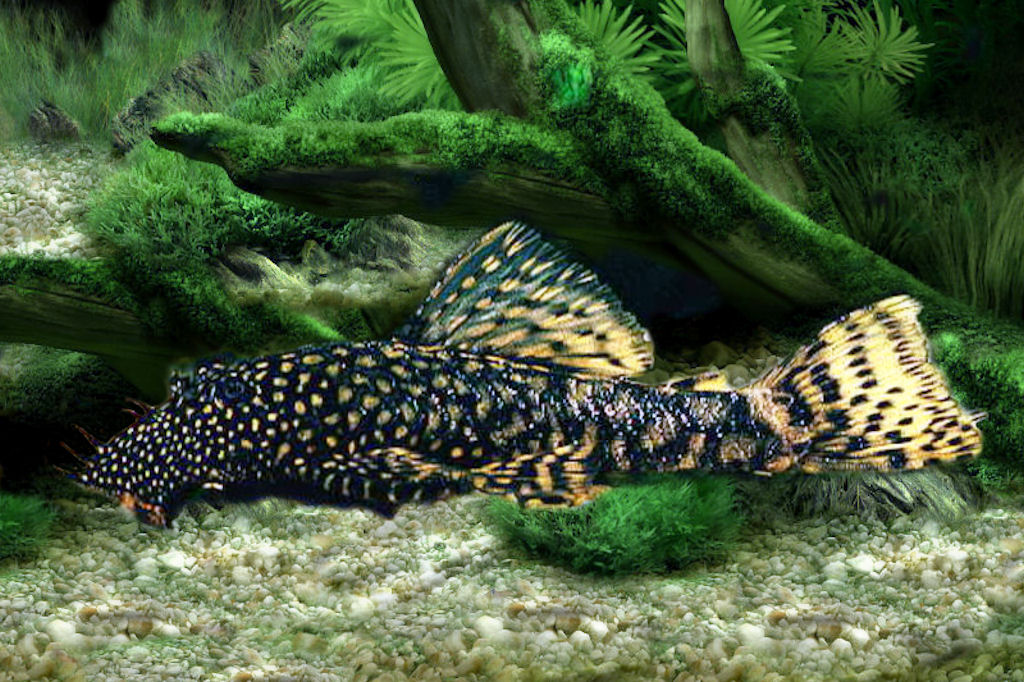

Conservation status
- Least Concern (IUCN 3.1)

Scientific classification
- Kingdom: Animalia
- Phylum: Chordata
- Class: Actinopterygii
- Order: Siluriformes
- Family: Loricariidae
- Genus: Ancistrus
- Species: A. cirrhosus

Binomial name
- Ancistrus cirrhosus (Valenciennes, 1836)

Synonyms
- Hypostomus cirrhosus Valenciennes, 1836

= Ancistrus cirrhosus =

Species of fish

Ancistrus cirrhosus is a species of freshwater ray-finned fish in the subfamily Hypostominae of the family Loricariidae, the armored catfishes. Like most other species in the family, it is found in South America.

== Etymology ==
The generic name, Ancistrus, was erected by Rudolf Kner, who did not explain the etymology of the name. It is thought to be derived from ágkistron, a Greek term meaning "fish hook" or "hook of a spindle" and to refer to the hooked odontodes on the interopercular bone. The specific name, cirrhosus, means "curled", an allusion to the fleshy tentacles that adorn the heads of adult males and the snouts of females.

== Taxonomy ==
Ancistrus cirrhosus was first formally described in 1836 by the French zoologist Achille Valenciennes via an illustration in his book Voyage dans l'Amérique méridionale; no type locality was given. The illustration was re-published in 1840 in volume 15 of Histoire naturelle des poissons. In 1980, Isaäc J. H. Isbrücker tried to designate a lectotype, but the procedure he used to do this is now considered invalid.

In a comprehensive review of the subfamily Hypostominae, done in 2025, nine tribes were recognized within the subfamily; the genus Ancistrus, and by extension this species, were placed in Ancistrini.

== Description ==
Ancistrus cirrhosus reaches a standard length of 9.1 cm (3.6 in). Ancistrus species develop soft, bushy tentacles on the snout when sexually mature, these are better developed in the males than they are in females.

== Distribution and habitat ==
Ancistrus cirrhosus is found in South America, where it occurs in Argentina, southern Brazil, Paraguay and Uruguay in the Paraná-Paraguay and Uruguay river basins (there are also old records of this fish from Bolivia and central Brazil; these are regarded as unreliable). Within these areas, this fish is found in streams with a fast current and rocky substrate.

== Human interactions ==
Ancistrus cirrhosus appears in the aquarium trade.
