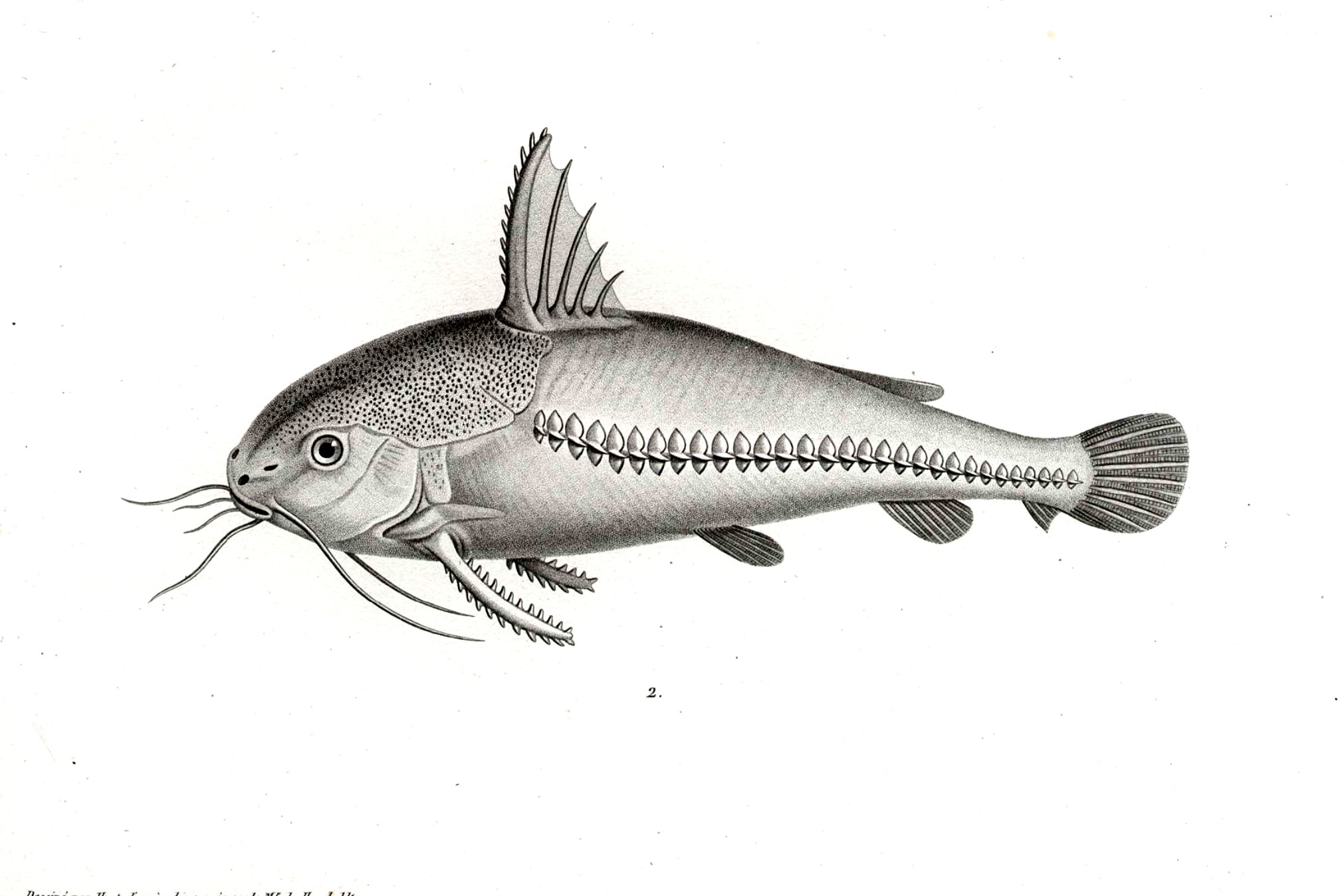

Conservation status
- Least Concern (IUCN 3.1)

Scientific classification
- Kingdom: Animalia
- Phylum: Chordata
- Class: Actinopterygii
- Order: Siluriformes
- Family: Doradidae
- Subfamily: Doradinae
- Genus: Centrochir
- Species: C. crocodili

Binomial name
- Centrochir crocodili (Humboldt, 1821)

Synonyms
- Doras crocodili Humboldt, 1821; Doras longispinis Steindachner, 1878

= Centrochir crocodili =

Species of fish

Centrochir crocodili is a species of catfish (order Siluriformes) in the family Doradidae. This species is endemic to Colombia where it is found in the Magdalena River basin and reaches a length of 21.0 centimetres (8.3 in) SL.
