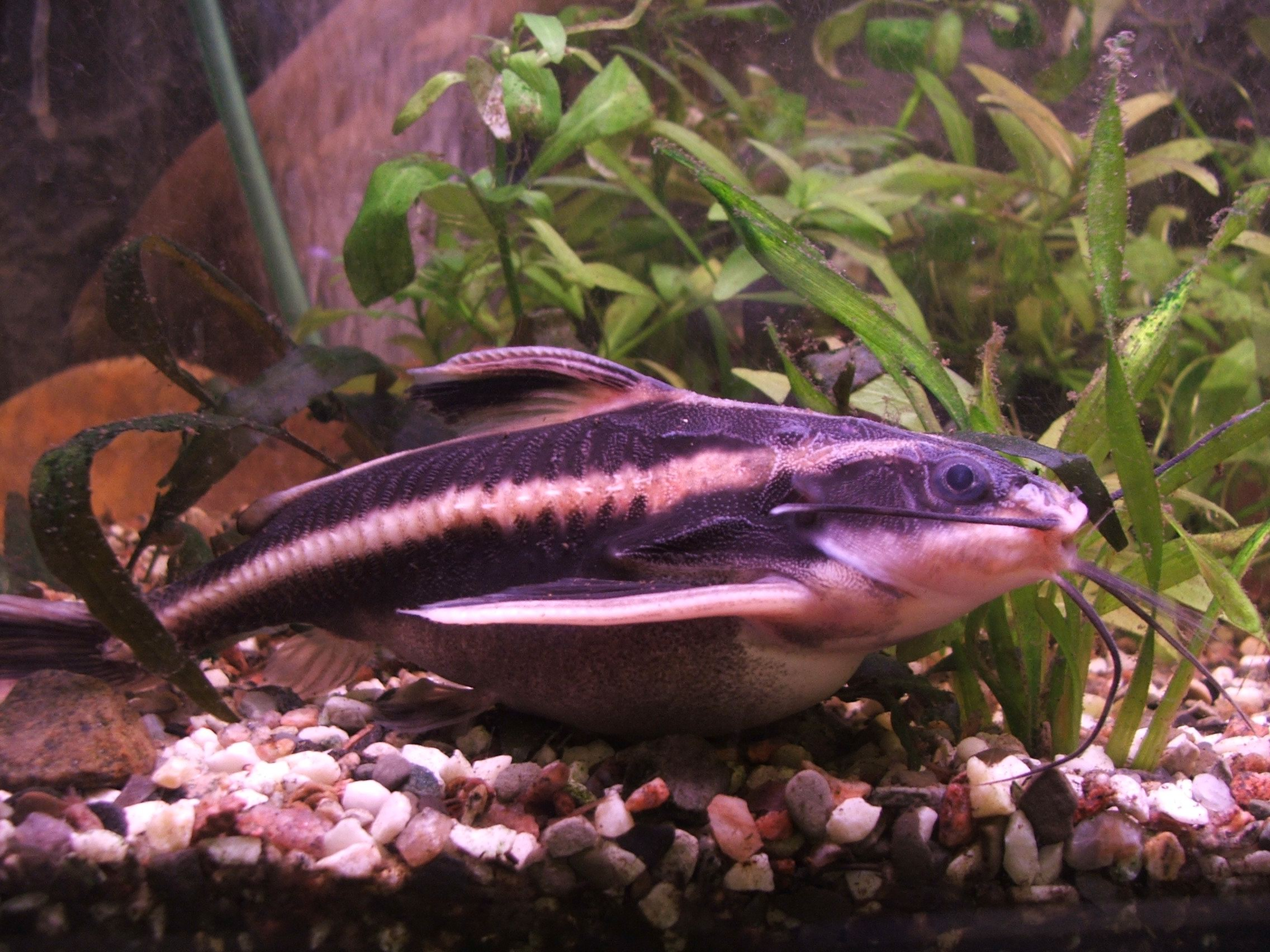

Conservation status
- Least Concern (IUCN 3.1)

Scientific classification
- Kingdom: Animalia
- Phylum: Chordata
- Class: Actinopterygii
- Order: Siluriformes
- Family: Doradidae
- Genus: Platydoras
- Species: P. armatulus

Binomial name
- Platydoras armatulus (Valenciennes, 1840)

Synonyms
- Doras armatulus Valenciennes, 1840

= Striped Raphael catfish =

Species of fish

The striped Raphael catfish (Platydoras armatulus) is a catfish of the family Doradidae. It may also be called Southern striped Raphael, talking catfish, chocolate doradid, chocolate catfish or thorny catfish. It is native to the Amazon, Paraguay–Paraná and lower Orinoco basins in South America. This peaceful, nocturnal species is a popular aquarium fish due to its pleasant temperament and curious nature.

This catfish has long been confused with Platydoras costatus of Suriname and French Guiana, where the pale stripe on the body does not extend onto the head.

== Description and behavior ==
These fish burrow in the soft river bottoms and frequently occurs on sandy bottoms. These fish feed on mollusks, crustaceans and organic debris.

They have rigid pectoral fin spines. The striped Raphael catfish also has tiny and curved protective spines running along its body. The typically reported maximum standard length of this species is 20–24 cm (7.9–9.4 in). Considerably larger individuals, up to 43 cm (17 in) long, have been reported from the Tocantins–Araguaia basin, but this population, together with those from the Tapajós and Xingu, likely represent an undescribed species (not to be confused with P. birindellii, a species from the Xingu basin that was described in 2018).

Juvenile striped raphael catfish have been recorded cleaning piscivorous fish such as Hoplias malabaricus. The stripe pattern in the young may serve as a signal that allows for its recognition as a cleaner. It is noted that the striping pattern is not as strong in adults, and so the cleaning behavior is probably only seen in juveniles.

== In the aquarium ==
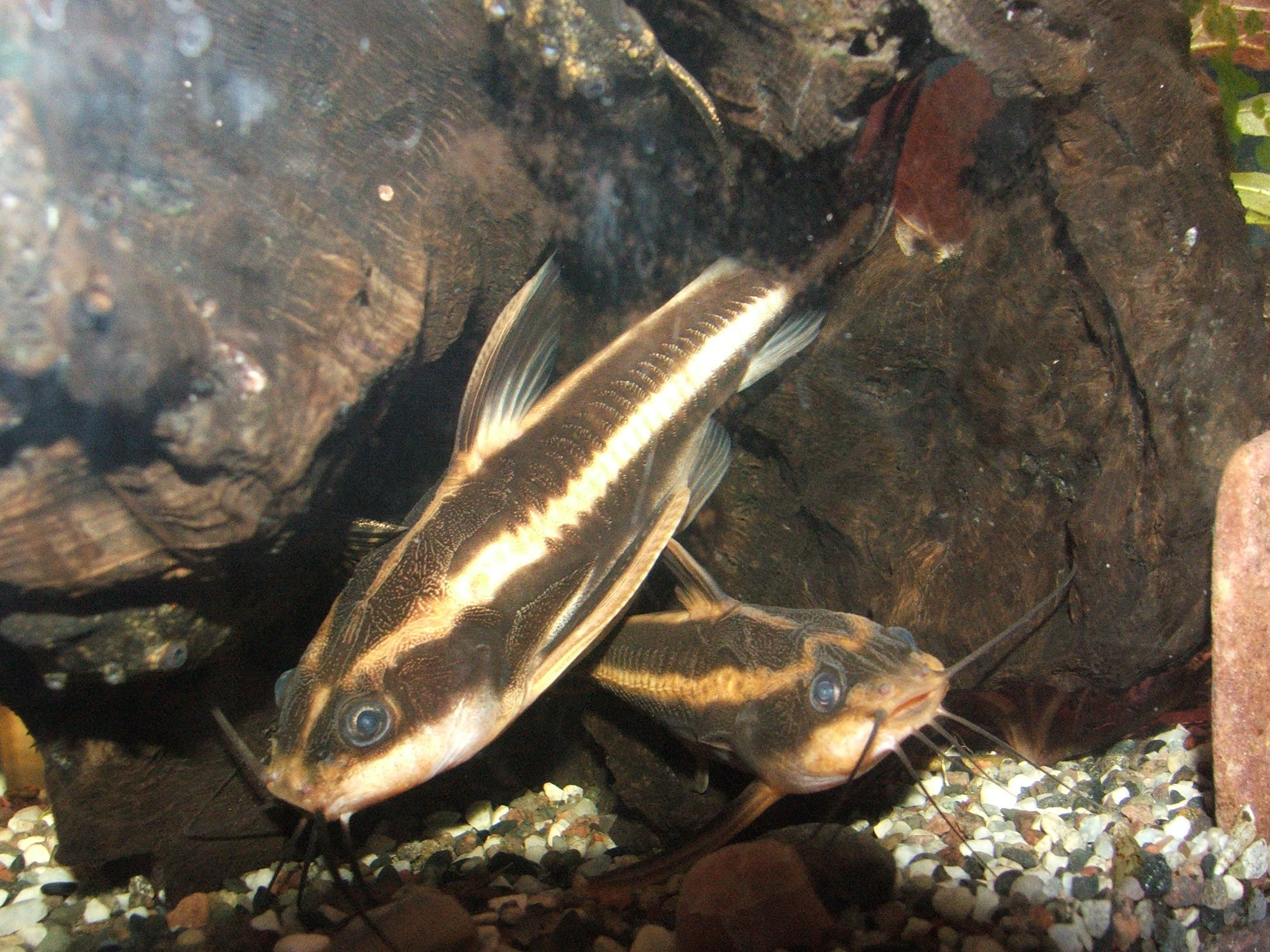
Striped Raphael catfish in an aquarium.

The striped Raphael catfish is a fine and sociable community fish that are peaceful to fellow catfishes and other fish species. However, they are nocturnal, and are usually not visible during the day.

It is best not to catch the striped Raphael catfish with a fish net because they are prone to sticking out their pectoral fin spines in a very rigid manner, especially if stressed. Untangling these spines from a net is difficult and dangerous to both handler and fish. Alternative methods should be used. Although known as a spawning fish, sexual differences are unknown and there have been no reports of being successfully bred in captivity. Because of this, these fish must be wild-caught, and therefore related species of similar appearance sometimes appear in the hobby, such as Orinocodoras eigenmanni, which differs in a longer snout. The Raphael catfish will make some grunting/squeaking noises while out of water. Although generally sociable with other fish, sometimes this fish can feed on smaller fish so take care when introducing one to an established tank.

== See also ==
- List of freshwater aquarium fish species
