= Hassar =

Hassar may be:

- A common name for Callichthys callichthys
- A common name for Hoplosternum littorale
- Hassar (fish), a genus of doradid catfishes
- Abu Bakr al-Hassar, 12th century Muslim mathematician who first used the fraction bar, and writer
- Joudia Hassar-Benslimane (1943–2018), Moroccan historian and archeologist
