= Agamyxis albomaculatus =

Scientific classification
- Domain: Eukaryota
- Kingdom: Animalia
- Phylum: Chordata
- Class: Actinopterygii
- Order: Siluriformes
- Family: Doradidae
- Genus: Agamyxis
- Species: A. albomaculatus

Binomial name
- Agamyxis albomaculatus (W. K. H. Peters, 1877)

Synonyms
- Doras albomaculatus Peters, 1877

Species of fish

Agamyxis albomaculatus is an omnivorous species of thorny catfish endemic to the Orinoco River in Venezuela. This species grows to a length of 15 centimetres (5.9 in) SL. This species is found in the aquarium trade, but is less frequent than the similar and closely relative Agamyxis pectinifrons. Although the common name spotted raphael catfish most often refers to that species, it is occasionally used for Agamyxis albomaculatus.
