= Rhynchodoras woodsi =

Conservation status
- Least Concern (IUCN 3.1)

Scientific classification
- Kingdom: Animalia
- Phylum: Chordata
- Class: Actinopterygii
- Order: Siluriformes
- Family: Doradidae
- Genus: Rhynchodoras
- Species: R. woodsi

Binomial name
- Rhynchodoras woodsi Glodek, 1976

Species of fish

Rhynchodoras woodsi is a species of thorny catfish endemic to Ecuador where it is found in the Bobonaza River (a tributary of the Pastaza River) of the upper Amazon River drainage. This species grows to a length of 10.5 centimetres (4.1 in) SL.

== In the aquarium ==
R. woodsi has been kept in the aquarium. A timid fish species, they should not be kept with boisterous tankmates. Active at night, they will hide throughout the day. Though they will eventually recognize prepared foods, it is best to acclimate these fish on frozen brine shrimp. They have an affinity for wood, which should be included as part of the aquarium furniture.
