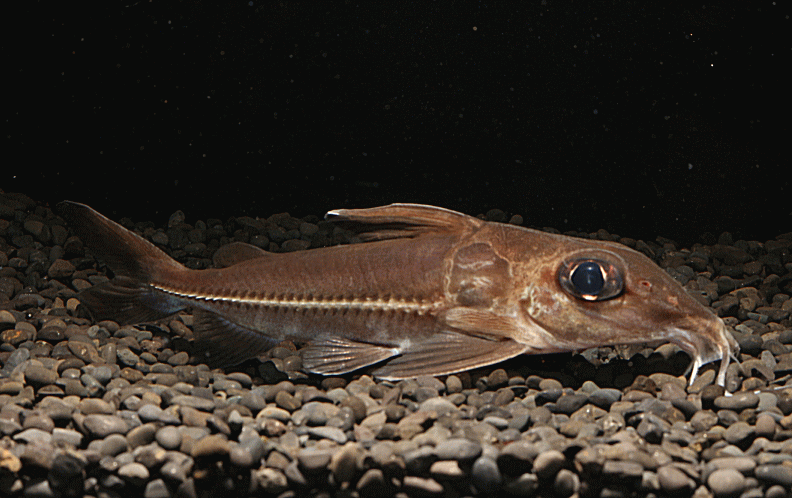

Scientific classification
- Kingdom: Animalia
- Phylum: Chordata
- Class: Actinopterygii
- Order: Siluriformes
- Family: Doradidae
- Genus: Doras
- Species: D. carinatus

Binomial name
- Doras carinatus (Linnaeus, 1766)

Synonyms
- Silurus carinatus Linnaeus, 1766

= Doras carinatus =

Species of fish

Doras carinatus is a species of thorny catfish found in Brazil, French Guiana, Guyana, Suriname and Venezuela. This species grows to a length of 30.0 centimetres (11.8 in) SL. This species can emit sounds by moving its pectoral spines. Every basic unit of sound emitted lasts for 60–70 milliseconds, with a frequency of 60–90 hertz corresponding to the reply frequency of the muscles utilized.
