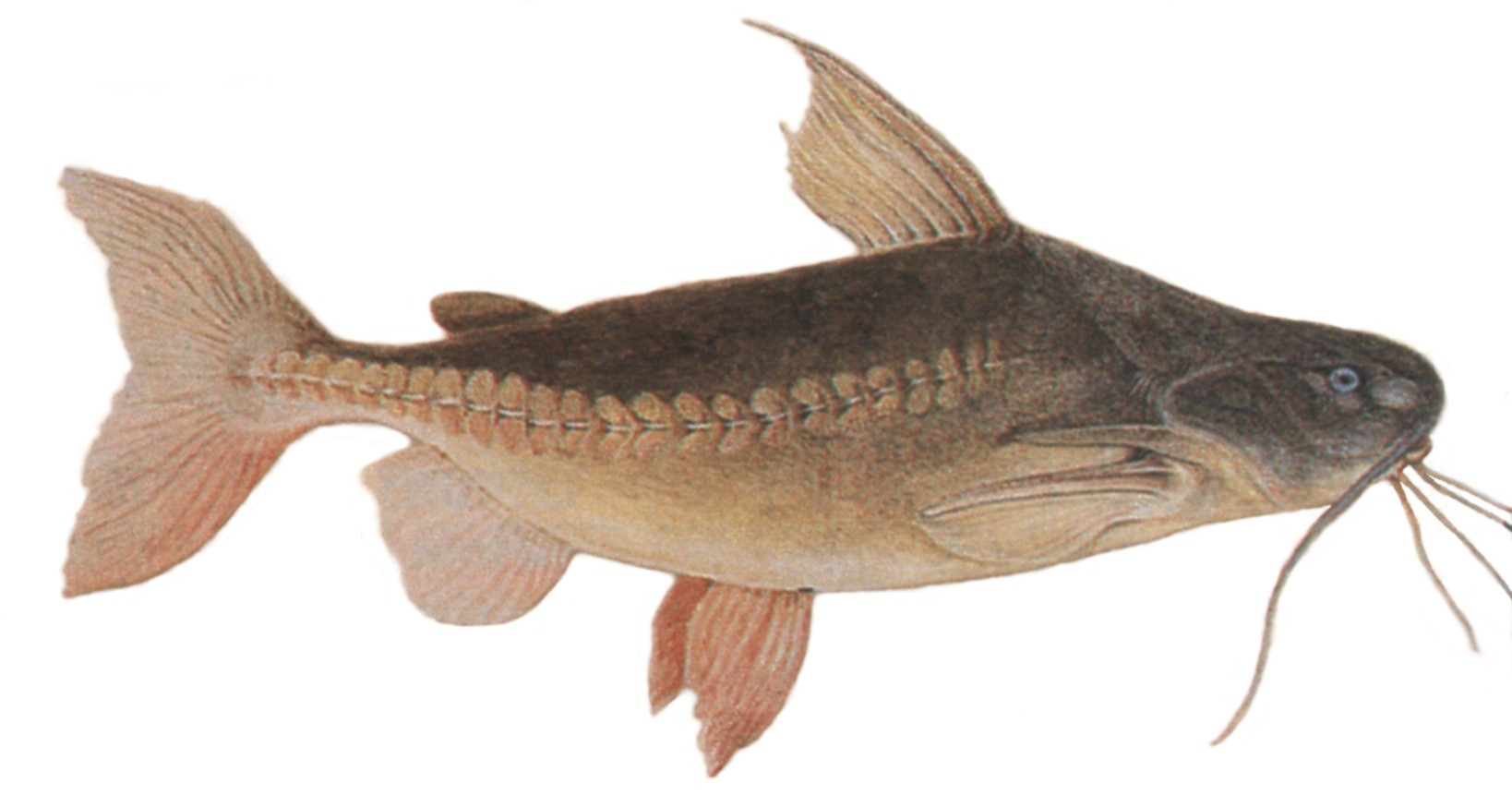

Conservation status
- Least Concern (IUCN 3.1)

Scientific classification
- Kingdom: Animalia
- Phylum: Chordata
- Class: Actinopterygii
- Order: Siluriformes
- Family: Doradidae
- Genus: Pterodoras
- Species: P. granulosus

Binomial name
- Pterodoras granulosus (Valenciennes in Humboldt & Valenciennes, 1821)

Synonyms
- Doras granulosus Valenciennes, 1821; Doras maculatus Valenciennes, 1834; Doras murica Natterer, 1855; Doras laevigatulus Berg, 1901; Megalodoras laevigatulus (Berg, 1901); Doras lentiginosus C. H. Eigenmann, 1917; Pterodoras lentiginosus (Eigenmann, 1917); Silurus armatus Larrañaga, 1923; Silurus duodecimradiatus Larrañaga, 1923; Silurus 12-radiatus Larrañaga, 1923; Parapterodoras paranensis Risso & Morra, 1964

= Pterodoras granulosus =

Granulated catfish

Species of fish

The granulated catfish (Pterodoras granulosus) is a species of thorny catfish found in the Paraná and Amazon basin as well as the coastal drainages of Suriname and Guyana. This species is commercially caught for human consumption as well as being displayed in public aquaria.

== Description ==
This species grows to a length of 70 centimetres (28 in) TL and to a weight of 6.5 kilograms (14 lb). The colour pattern of these catfish varies depending upon the location that they originate from, though they are usually a muddy-brown colour with some darker spots over the body and fins. Adults are darker and the spotting fades from juvenile coloration. There are no scales, but the skin is thick and tough; also, 23–28 shallow lateral plates known as scutes are found along the length of the body. Their eyes are very small in comparison to the rest of the fish and they have three simple pairs of barbels. They have a deeply forked caudal fin, which also helps to distinguish this fish from other large Doradids.

== Ecology ==
P. granulosus occurs in small groups.

P. granulosus is a nocturnal predator. It is an opportunistic omnivore with a wide food spectrum, consuming vascular plants, mollusks, and other food depending on their availability. It has been shown that this species feeds on an introduced species of bivalve, Corbicula fluminae, and may be able to act as a form of biological pest control. There is evidence that P. granulosus may be important for seed dispersal as seeds have been found in their stomachs; seeds of the families Gramineae, Moraceae, and Polygonaceae are most often present in their stomachs.

P. granulosus is a migratory species of catfish. From March to July, there is little migration and any movement is downstream. In August, the upstream migration begins, intensifying in October and peaking in January.
