= T. microstomus =

T. microstomus may refer to:

- Trachydoras microstomus, a thorny catfish species
- Typhlops microstomus, a snake species

== See also ==
- Microstomus
