= Pterodoras rivasi =

Conservation status
- Least Concern (IUCN 3.1)

Scientific classification
- Kingdom: Animalia
- Phylum: Chordata
- Class: Actinopterygii
- Order: Siluriformes
- Family: Doradidae
- Genus: Pterodoras
- Species: P. rivasi

Binomial name
- Pterodoras rivasi (Fernández-Yépez, 1950)

Synonyms
- Apuredoras rivasi Fernández-Yépez, 1950; Sachsdoras apurensis Fernández-Yépez, 1968; Pterodoras angeli Fernández-Yépez, 1968

Species of fish

Pterodoras rivasi is a species of thorny catfish found in the Orinoco River basin of Colombia and Venezuela. This species grows to a length of 55 centimetres (22 in) SL.
