= Anadoras regani =

Scientific classification
- Kingdom: Animalia
- Phylum: Chordata
- Class: Actinopterygii
- Order: Siluriformes
- Family: Doradidae
- Genus: Anadoras
- Species: A. regani

Binomial name
- Anadoras regani (Steindachner, 1908)

Synonyms
- Doras regani Steindachner, 1908

Species of fish

Anadoras regani is a species of thorny catfish found in the Oyapock and Amazon basins of Brazil, French Guiana, and Colombia. This species grows to a length of 11.0 centimetres (4.3 in) SL. The IUCN Red List considers it a junior synonym of Anadoras weddellii.

Although the patronym was not identified it is probably in honor of ichthyologist Charles Tate Regan (1878–1943), of the Natural History Museum in London.
