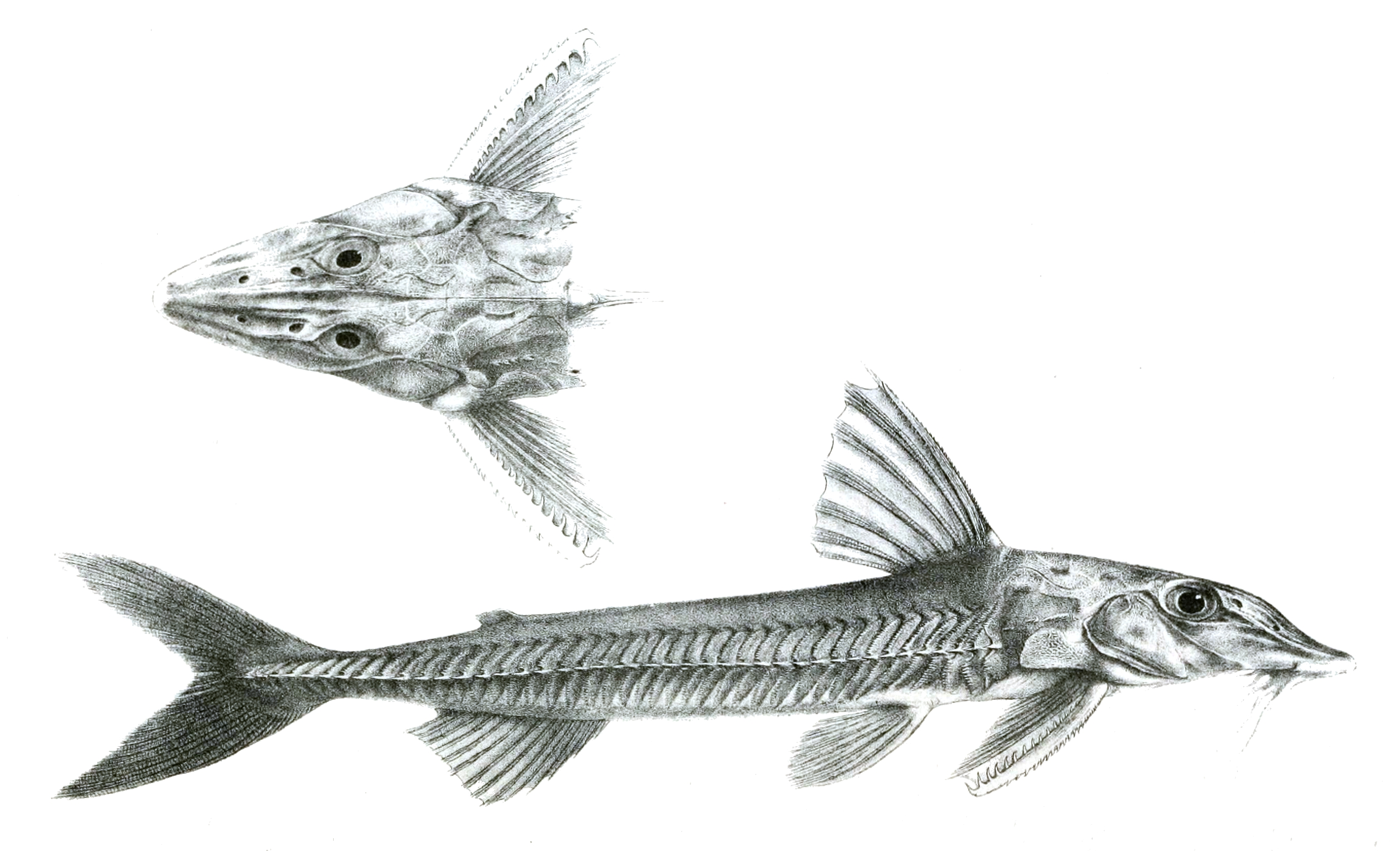
- Leptodoras acipenserinus

Scientific classification
- Kingdom: Animalia
- Phylum: Chordata
- Class: Actinopterygii
- Division: Teleostei
- Order: Siluriformes
- Family: Doradidae
- Subfamily: Doradinae
- Genus: Leptodoras; Boulenger, 1898

Type species
- Oxydoras acipenserinus Günther, 1868

= Leptodoras =

Genus of fishes

Leptodoras is a genus of thorny catfishes native to South America.

== Taxonomy ==
Leptodoras is a monophyletic genus based on the single unique characteristic: presence of an infranuchal scute. This scute is the first in a series of well-developed midlateral scutes characteristic of most doradids. It is one of the most derived genera within the clade of fimbriate-barbel doradids. The most closely related genus to Leptodoras is Anduzedoras.

This genus includes eleven species, making it the largest doradid genus. There has been taxonomic confusion due to similarities of some species with each other and members of other genera. Misunderstood distributions and identities of some species added to this confusion. Most species were described from small geographic areas without information on their potential distributions. Also, specimens have been rare in museums until recently. An assessment in 2005 diagnosed Leptodoras and its seven species while describing three new species.

== Species ==
There are currently 12 recognized species in this genus:

- Leptodoras acipenserinus (Günther, 1868)
- Leptodoras cataniai Sabaj Pérez, 2005
- Leptodoras copei (Fernández-Yépez, 1968)
- Leptodoras hasemani (Steindachner, 1915)
- Leptodoras juruensis Boulenger, 1898
- Leptodoras linnelli C. H. Eigenmann, 1912
- Leptodoras marki Birindelli & Sousa, 2010
- Leptodoras myersi J. E. Böhlke, 1970
- Leptodoras nelsoni Sabaj Pérez, 2005
- Leptodoras oyakawai Birindelli, Sousa & Sabaj Pérez, 2008
- Leptodoras praelongus (G. S. Myers & S. H. Weitzman, 1956)
- Leptodoras rogersae Sabaj Pérez, 2005

== Distribution ==
Leptodoras species are distributed in large, predominantly lowland rivers east of the Andes throughout the northern half of South America. Species are distributed throughout lowlands in the Orinoco, Amazon, and Tocantins basins and several coastal river systems that enter the Atlantic between the mouths of the Orinoco and Amazon. Leptodoras is not known from west-Andean drainages or Atlantic-slope drainages south of the Tocantins.

== Description ==
Leptodoras is easily recognized by its long conical snout and well-developed oral hood formed by the membranous union of maxillary barbels, paired jaw barbels on the chin, and lip structures. It has fimbriate barbels.

== Ecology ==
Most species of Leptodoras are truly benthic and typically inhabit the deep swift-flowing waters of large rivers. Many species of Leptodoras migrate at dusk into shallow waters near shore to forage over beaches and shoals of sand or silt. Other species, such as L. juruensis and L. myersi, appear more restricted to deep channel habitats. Leptodoras species are not known from elevations exceeding 500 metres (1600 ft) above sea level and most records are from below 200 m (660 ft).

The oral hood found in Leptodoras species presumably facilitates the detection and suction-feeding of shallowly buried invertebrates. Stomach contents typically include chironomid larvae, sand, and detritus.
