= Rhynchodoras castilloi =

Conservation status
- Vulnerable (IUCN 3.1)

Scientific classification
- Kingdom: Animalia
- Phylum: Chordata
- Class: Actinopterygii
- Order: Siluriformes
- Family: Doradidae
- Genus: Rhynchodoras
- Species: R. castilloi

Binomial name
- Rhynchodoras castilloi Birindelli, Sabaj Pérez & Taphorn, 2007

Species of fish

Rhynchodoras castilloi is a species of thorny catfish endemic to Venezuela where it is found in the middle to lower Apure River. It is found only in deep water. This species grows to a length of 7.98 centimetres (3.14 in) SL.
