= Tenellus cristinae =

Conservation status
- Least Concern (IUCN 3.1)

Scientific classification
- Kingdom: Animalia
- Phylum: Chordata
- Class: Actinopterygii
- Order: Siluriformes
- Family: Doradidae
- Genus: Tenellus
- Species: T. cristinae

Binomial name
- Tenellus cristinae (Sabaj Pérez, Arce H., Sousa & Birindelli, 2014)

Synonyms
- Nemadoras cristinae

Species of fish

Tenellus cristinae is a species of thorny catfish native to the Amazon basin where it can be found in Brazil, Colombia and Peru. This species grows to a length of 12.4 centimetres (4.9 in) Standard Length.
