= Trachydoras brevis =

Scientific classification
- Kingdom: Animalia
- Phylum: Chordata
- Class: Actinopterygii
- Division: Teleostei
- Order: Siluriformes
- Family: Doradidae
- Genus: Trachydoras
- Species: T. brevis

Binomial name
- Trachydoras brevis (Kner, 1853)

Synonyms
- Doras brevis Kner, 1853

Species of fish

Trachydoras brevis is a species of thorny catfish found in the Negro and Essequibo River basins of Guyana and Brazil. This species grows to a length of 9.3 centimetres (3.7 in) SL.
