= Hassar wilderi =

Conservation status
- Least Concern (IUCN 3.1)

Scientific classification
- Kingdom: Animalia
- Phylum: Chordata
- Class: Actinopterygii
- Order: Siluriformes
- Family: Doradidae
- Genus: Hassar
- Species: H. wilderi

Binomial name
- Hassar wilderi Kindle, 1895

Species of fish

Hassar wilderi is a species of thorny catfish endemic to Brazil where it is only found in the Tocantins River basin. This species grows to a length of 25.0 centimetres (9.8 in) TL.
