= Megalodoras guayoensis =

Conservation status
- Least Concern (IUCN 3.1)

Scientific classification
- Kingdom: Animalia
- Phylum: Chordata
- Class: Actinopterygii
- Order: Siluriformes
- Family: Doradidae
- Genus: Megalodoras
- Species: M. guayoensis

Binomial name
- Megalodoras guayoensis (Fernández-Yépez, 1968)

Synonyms
- Hoplodoras ramirezi (Fernández-Yépez, 1968); Deltadoras guayoensis Fernández-Yépez, 1968

Species of fish

Megalodoras guayoensis is a species of thorny catfish endemic to Venezuela where it occurs in the Orinoco River basin. This species grows to a length of 53 centimetres (21 in) SL.
