= Tenellus leporhinus =

Conservation status
- Least Concern (IUCN 3.1)

Scientific classification
- Kingdom: Animalia
- Phylum: Chordata
- Class: Actinopterygii
- Order: Siluriformes
- Family: Doradidae
- Genus: Tenellus
- Species: T. leporhinus

Binomial name
- Tenellus leporhinus C. H. Eigenmann, 1912

Synonyms
- Nemadoras leporhinus Eigenmann, 1912

Species of fish

Tenellus leporhinus is a species of thorny catfish native to Brazil, Guyana and Venezuela where it is found in the Orinoco, Branco, Trombetas and Essequibo River basina. This species grows to a length of 8.1 centimetres (3.2 in) SL.
