= Hassar affinis =

Conservation status
- Least Concern (IUCN 3.1)

Scientific classification
- Kingdom: Animalia
- Phylum: Chordata
- Class: Actinopterygii
- Order: Siluriformes
- Family: Doradidae
- Genus: Hassar
- Species: H. affinis

Binomial name
- Hassar affinis (Steindachner, 1881)

Synonyms
- Oxydoras affinis Steindachner, 1881; Hassar woodi Fowler, 1941; Hassar iheringi Fowler, 1941

Species of fish

Hassar affinis is a species of thorny catfish endemic to Brazil where it is found in the Parnaiba River basin. This species grows to a length of 20.0 centimetres (7.9 in) SL.
