= Scorpiodoras heckelii =

Conservation status
- Least Concern (IUCN 3.1)

Scientific classification
- Kingdom: Animalia
- Phylum: Chordata
- Class: Actinopterygii
- Order: Siluriformes
- Family: Doradidae
- Genus: Scorpiodoras
- Species: S. heckelii

Binomial name
- Scorpiodoras heckelii (Kner, 1855)

Synonyms
- Doras heckelii Kner, 1855; Doras calderonensis Vaillant, 1880; Acanthodoras calderonensis (Vaillant, 1880); Autanadoras milesi Fernández-Yépez, 1950

Species of fish

Scorpiodoras heckelii is a species of thorny catfish from the Negro, Orinoco and upper Amazon basins in Brazil and Venezuela. This species grows to a length of 16.1 centimetres (6.3 in) SL.
