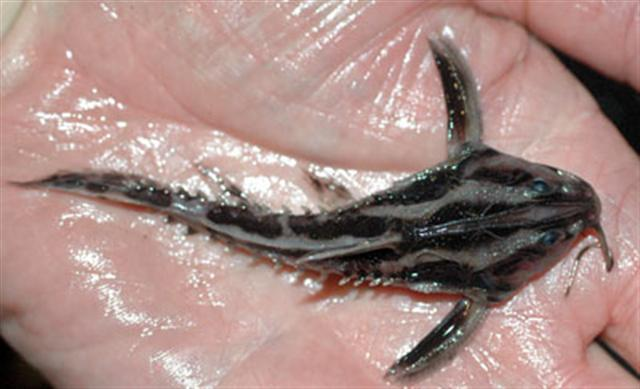
- Juvenile

Conservation status
- Least Concern (IUCN 3.1)

Scientific classification
- Kingdom: Animalia
- Phylum: Chordata
- Class: Actinopterygii
- Order: Siluriformes
- Family: Doradidae
- Genus: Megalodoras
- Species: M. uranoscopus

Binomial name
- Megalodoras uranoscopus (C. H. Eigenmann & R. S. Eigenmann, 1888)

Synonyms
- Doras uranoscopus C. H. Eigenmann & R. S. Eigenmann, 1888; Hoplodoras uranoscopus (C. H. Eigenmann & R. S. Eigenmann, 1888); Oxydoras huberi Steindachner, 1911; Pseudodoras huberi (Steindachner, 1911); Doras libertatis Miranda-Ribeiro, 1912; Megalodoras libertatis (Miranda Ribeiro, 1912); Megalodoras irwini Eigenmann, 1925

= Megalodoras uranoscopus =

Species of fish

The giant talking catfish or giant raphael catfish (Megalodoras uranoscopus) is a species of thorny catfish that is native to the Amazon Basin in Bolivia, Brazil, Colombia, Ecuador and Peru. This species grows to a length of 60 centimetres (24 in) SL (for a female specimen) and a maximum weight of 4.6 kilograms (10 lb). These fish are harvested in local commercial fisheries.

== Ecology ==
M. uranoscopus occurs in small groups and occasionally forms schools. This mainly diurnal species inhabits rivers and feeds on the fruits of Licania longipetala and Astrocaryum jauari in addition to pulmonate snails.

== Aquarium ==
This species is not commonly imported but it is appealing for its colour pattern which remains with age. Diet includes catfish pellets and tablets, prawns and frozen bloodworms. This species requires a large aquarium but is otherwise peaceful, hardy and compatible with most midsized to large fish. A group of three or more is ideal. The lighting should not be too bright. Hiding places should be provided for these fish.
