= Nemadoras hemipeltis =

Scientific classification
- Domain: Eukaryota
- Kingdom: Animalia
- Phylum: Chordata
- Class: Actinopterygii
- Order: Siluriformes
- Family: Doradidae
- Genus: Nemadoras
- Species: N. hemipeltis

Binomial name
- Nemadoras hemipeltis (C. H. Eigenmann, 1925)

Synonyms
- Opsodoras hemipeltis Eigenmann, 1925

Species of fish

Nemadoras hemipeltis is a species of thorny catfish native to the Amazon basin where it can be found in Brazil, Colombia and Peru. This species grows to a length of 14.4 centimetres (5.7 in) SL.
