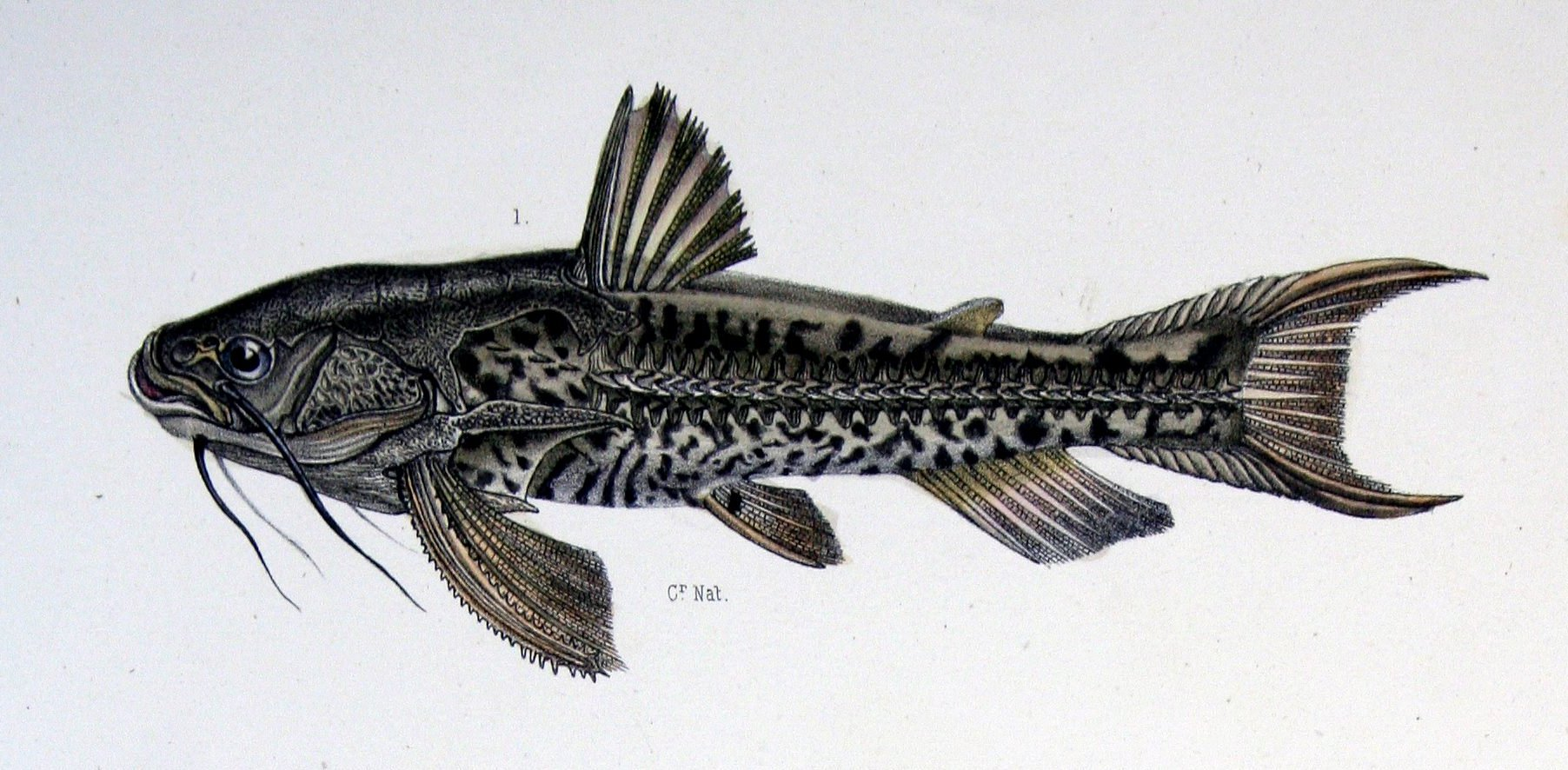

Conservation status
- Least Concern (IUCN 3.1)

Scientific classification
- Kingdom: Animalia
- Phylum: Chordata
- Class: Actinopterygii
- Division: Teleostei
- Order: Siluriformes
- Family: Doradidae
- Genus: Anadoras
- Species: A. weddellii

Binomial name
- Anadoras weddellii (Castelnau, 1855)

Synonyms
- Doras weddellii Castelnau, 1855

= Anadoras weddellii =

Species of fish

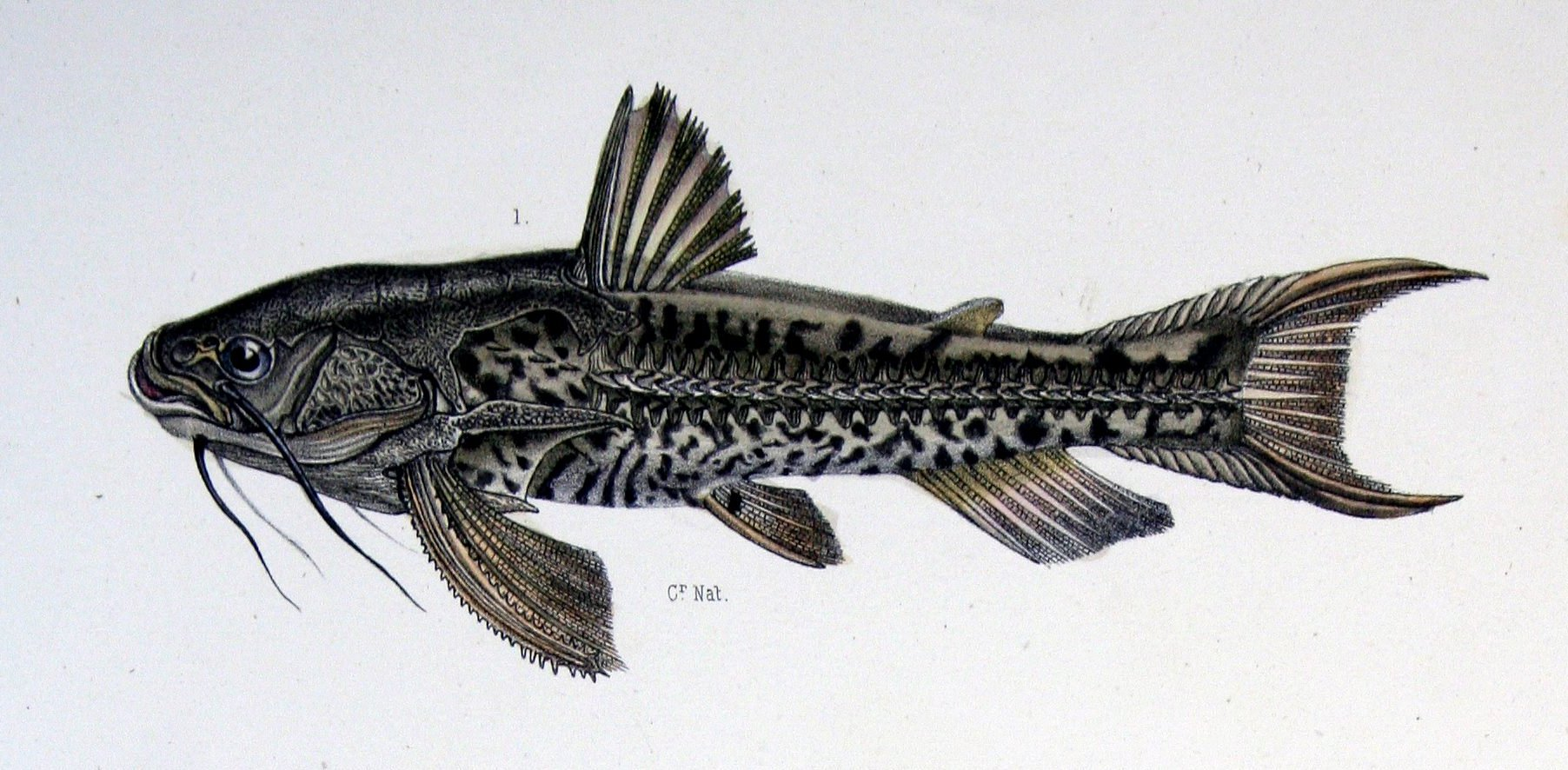
Drawing of Anadoras weddellii fish

Anadoras weddellii is a species of thorny catfish that is found in Argentina, Brazil, Bolivia and Paraguay. This species grows to a length of 15.0 centimetres (5.9 in) SL. The IUCN Red List considers Anadoras regani a junior synonym of Anadoras weddellii, but FishBase and the Catalog of Fishes regard it as valid.

The fish is named in honor of British physician-botanist Hugh Algernon Weddell (1819–1877), who presented the type specimen in the form of a dried skin and a drawing of the fish.
