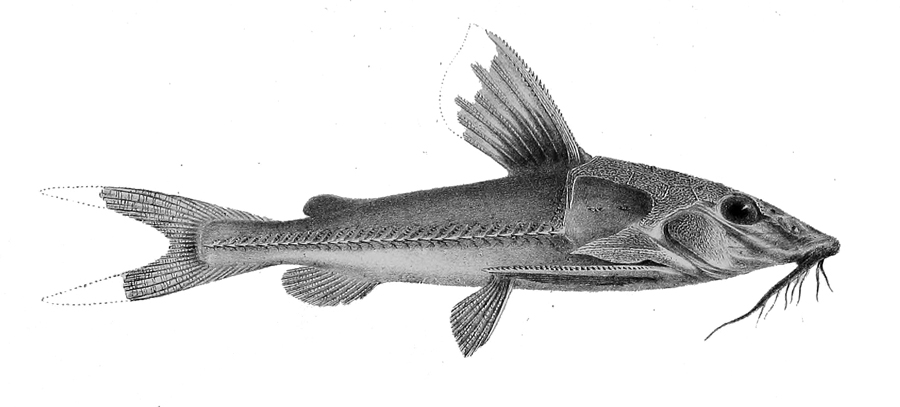

Conservation status
- Least Concern (IUCN 3.1)

Scientific classification
- Kingdom: Animalia
- Phylum: Chordata
- Class: Actinopterygii
- Order: Siluriformes
- Family: Doradidae
- Genus: Hemidoras
- Species: H. stuebelii

Binomial name
- Hemidoras stuebelii (Steindachner, 1882)

Synonyms
- Oxydoras stuebelii Steindachner, 1882; Opsodoras orthacanthus C. H. Eigenmann, 1925; Opsodoras stuebelii (Steindachner, 1882)

= Hemidoras stuebelii =

Species of fish

Hemidoras stuebelii, the Maranon thorn catfish, is a species of thorny catfish from the family Doradidae which is found in the Amazon Basin in Bolivia, Brazil, Colombia, Ecuador and Peru.
