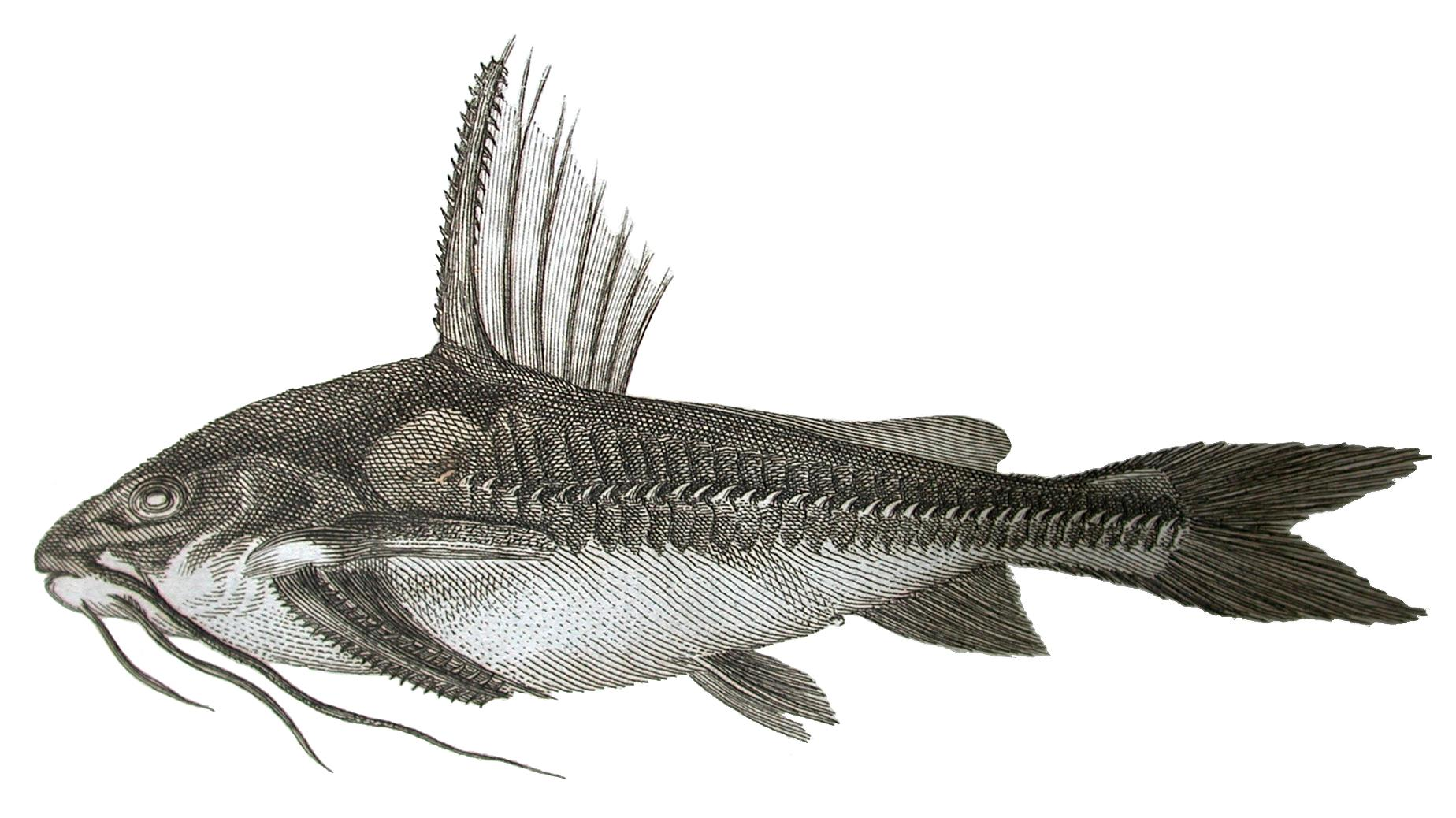
- Illustration by Gronow, 1754

Scientific classification
- Kingdom: Animalia
- Phylum: Chordata
- Class: Actinopterygii
- Order: Siluriformes
- Family: Doradidae
- Genus: Platydoras
- Species: P. costatus

Binomial name
- Platydoras costatus (Linnaeus, 1758)

Synonyms
- Silurus costatus Linnaeus, 1758; Mystus ascita Gronow, 1854; Doras dentatus Kner, 1855; Platydoras dentatus (Kner, 1855); Doras helicophilus Günther, 1868; Platydoras helicophilus (Günther, 1868)

= Platydoras costatus =

Species of fish

Platydoras costatus, the Raphael catfish, is a species of thorny catfish native to rivers in Brazil, Suriname and French Guiana. It was long confused with other species in the genus Platydoras, especially the more widespread "true" striped Raphael catfish (P. armatulus). P. costatus grows to a length of 24 cm (9.4 in) SL, and unlike P. armatulus the light stripe along the body of P. costatus does not extend onto the head. This fish is a minor component of local fisheries and is also found in the aquarium trade.
