= W. maculata =

W. maculata may refer to:

- Wertheimeria maculata, a catfish endemic to Brazil
- Woodworthia maculata, a New Zealand gecko
