= Trachydoras nattereri =

Scientific classification
- Domain: Eukaryota
- Kingdom: Animalia
- Phylum: Chordata
- Class: Actinopterygii
- Order: Siluriformes
- Family: Doradidae
- Genus: Trachydoras
- Species: T. nattereri

Binomial name
- Trachydoras nattereri (Steindachner, 1881)

Synonyms
- Oxydoras nattereri Steindachner, 1881

Species of fish

Trachydoras nattereri is a species of thorny catfish native to the Amazon basin of Brazil, Colombia and Peru. This species grows to a length of 10.3 centimetres (4.1 in) SL.
