= Scorpiodoras bolivarensis =

Conservation status
- Least Concern (IUCN 3.1)

Scientific classification
- Kingdom: Animalia
- Phylum: Chordata
- Class: Actinopterygii
- Order: Siluriformes
- Family: Doradidae
- Genus: Scorpiodoras
- Species: S. bolivarensis

Binomial name
- Scorpiodoras bolivarensis (Fernández-Yépez, 1968)

Synonyms
- Amblydoras bolivarensis (Fernández-Yépez, 1968); Hildadoras bolivarensis Fernández-Yépez, 1968

Species of fish

Scorpiodoras bolivarensis is a species of thorny catfish endemic to Venezuela where it is found in the Orinoco River basin. This species grows to a length of 10.2 centimetres (4.0 in) SL.
