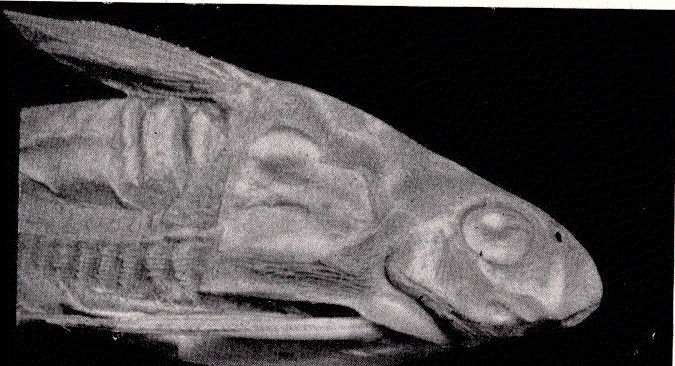

Scientific classification
- Kingdom: Animalia
- Phylum: Chordata
- Class: Actinopterygii
- Division: Teleostei
- Order: Siluriformes
- Family: Doradidae
- Genus: Trachydoras
- Species: T. paraguayensis

Binomial name
- Trachydoras paraguayensis (C. H. Eigenmann & Ward in Eigenmann, McAtee & Ward, 1907)

Synonyms
- Hemidoras paraguayensis Eigenmann & Ward, 1907

= Trachydoras paraguayensis =

Species of fish

Trachydoras paraguayensis is a species of thorny catfish found in the Paraná River basin of Argentina, Bolivia, Brazil and Paraguay. This species grows to a length of 10.4 centimetres (4.1 in) SL.
