= Doras =

Scientific classification
- Kingdom: Animalia
- Phylum: Chordata
- Class: Actinopterygii
- Division: Teleostei
- Order: Siluriformes
- Family: Doradidae
- Subfamily: Doradinae
- Genus: Doras; Lacépède, 1803

Type species
- Silurus carinatus Linnaeus, 1766

Synonyms
- Mormyrostoma; A. Miranda Ribeiro, 1911

Genus of fishes

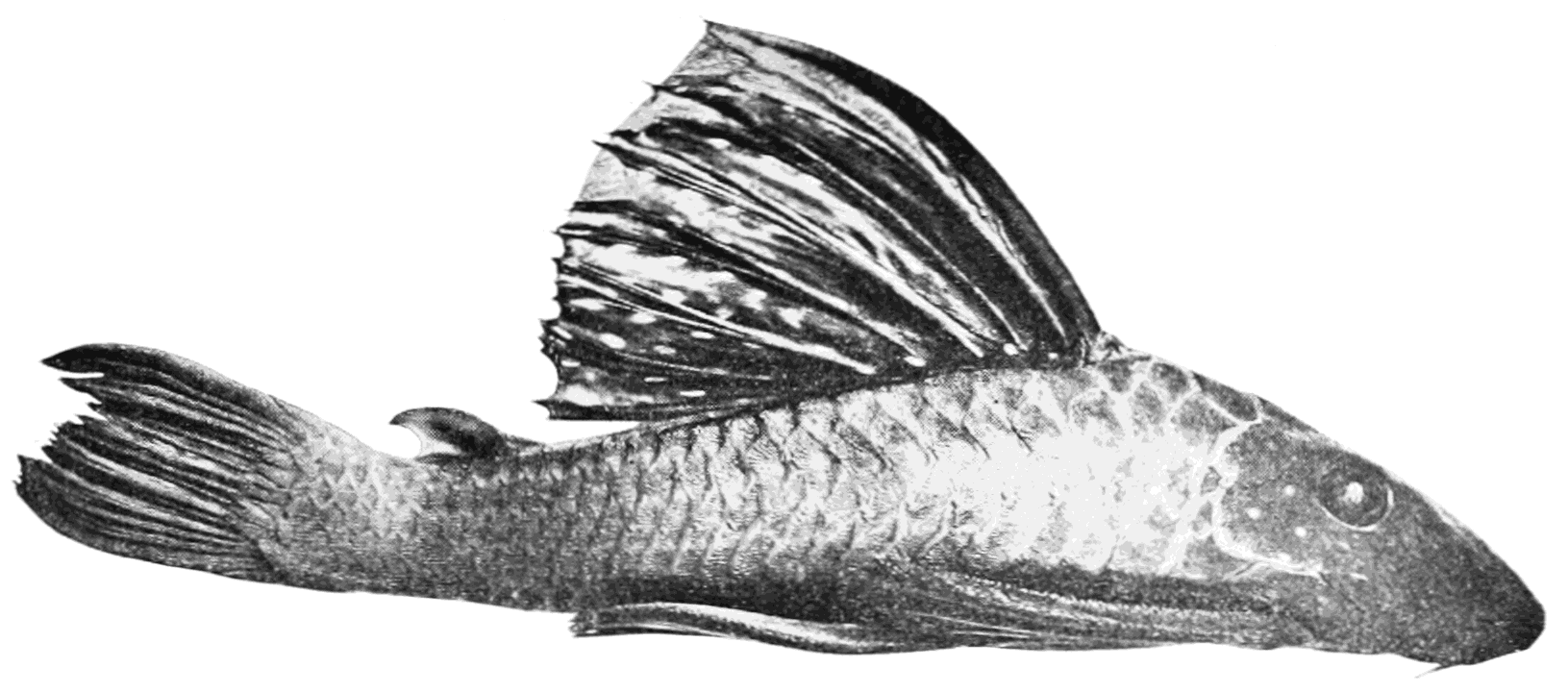

Doras is a genus of thorny catfishes native to tropical South America.

== Species ==
There are currently five recognized species in this genus (three species - D. eigenmanni, D. fimbriatus and D. punctatus have recently been moved to the new genus Ossancora):

- Doras carinatus (Linnaeus, 1766)
- Doras higuchii Sabaj Pérez & Birindelli, 2008
- Doras micropoeus (C. H. Eigenmann, 1912)
- Doras phlyzakion Sabaj Pérez & Birindelli, 2008
- Doras zuanoni Sabaj Pérez & Birindelli, 2008

== Fossil species ==
- †Doras dioneae Sabaj Pérez, Aguilera & Lundberg, 2007 (Miocene)
