= Rhynchodoras =

Scientific classification
- Domain: Eukaryota
- Kingdom: Animalia
- Phylum: Chordata
- Class: Actinopterygii
- Order: Siluriformes
- Family: Doradidae
- Subfamily: Doradinae
- Genus: Rhynchodoras; Klausewitz & Rössel, 1961

Type species
- Rhynchodoras xingui Klausewitz & Rössel, 1961

Genus of fishes

Rhynchodoras is a small genus of thorny catfishes native to South America. Rhynchodoras is closely related to Rhinodoras and Orinocodoras.

== Species ==
There are currently three recognized species in this genus:

- Rhynchodoras castilloi Birindelli, Sabaj Pérez & Taphorn, 2007
- Rhynchodoras woodsi Glodek, 1976
- Rhynchodoras xingui Klausewitz & Rössel, 1961

== Description ==
Rhynchodoras species are distinguished from all other doradids by their highly modified jaws which are strongly compressed, elongate, forceps-like in appearance, and project ventrally. The head is large and longer than it is wide, with a somewhat conical shape. There are three pairs of barbels, one pair of maxillary barbels and two pairs of mental barbels. Barbs occur on the dorsal fin and pectoral fin spines; on the anterior surface, barbs are curved towards the tip of the spine, and on the posterior surface are recurved away from the tip of the spine. The caudal fin is forked. There is a series of spined, lateral plates called scutes. Eyes are relatively small.

R. woodsi can be differentiated from R. xingui by a smaller eye and a slightly longer upper jaw than lower jaw. Also, R. castilloi differs from R. woodsi by having abundant, punctate tubercles on the body, and it differs from R. xingui in the number of form of its scutes.
