= Tenellus trimaculatus =

Conservation status
- Least Concern (IUCN 3.1)

Scientific classification
- Kingdom: Animalia
- Phylum: Chordata
- Class: Actinopterygii
- Order: Siluriformes
- Family: Doradidae
- Genus: Tenellus
- Species: T. trimaculatus

Binomial name
- Tenellus trimaculatus Boulenger, 1898

Synonyms
- Nemadoras trimaculatus Boulenger, 1898

Species of fish

Tenellus trimaculatus is a species of thorny catfish native to Brazil, Colombia, Ecuador, Guyana, Peru and Venezuela. This species grows to a length of 10.8 centimetres (4.3 in) SL.
