= Hassar orestis =

Conservation status
- Least Concern (IUCN 3.1)

Scientific classification
- Kingdom: Animalia
- Phylum: Chordata
- Class: Actinopterygii
- Order: Siluriformes
- Family: Doradidae
- Genus: Hassar
- Species: H. orestis

Binomial name
- Hassar orestis (Steindachner, 1875)

Synonyms
- Oxydoras orestis Steindachner, 1875; Hemidoras notospilus C. H. Eigenmann, 1912; Hassar notospilus (Eigenmann, 1912); Hassar ucayalensis Fowler, 1940

Species of fish

Hassar orestis is a species of thorny catfish that is native to the countries of Brazil, Colombia, Ecuador, Guyana, Peru and Venezuela. It is found in the Orinoco and Essequibo River basins. This species grows to a length of 20.6 centimetres (8.1 in) SL.
