= Nemadoras elongatus =

Scientific classification
- Kingdom: Animalia
- Phylum: Chordata
- Class: Actinopterygii
- Order: Siluriformes
- Family: Doradidae
- Genus: Nemadoras
- Species: N. elongatus

Binomial name
- Nemadoras elongatus (Boulenger, 1898)

Synonyms
- Oxydoras elongatus Boulenger, 1898; Opsodoras parallelus C. H. Eigenmann, 1925

Species of fish

Nemadoras elongatus is a species of thorny catfish native to the Amazon basin where it can be found in Brazil, Colombia and Peru. This species grows to a length of 12.7 centimetres (5.0 in) SL.
