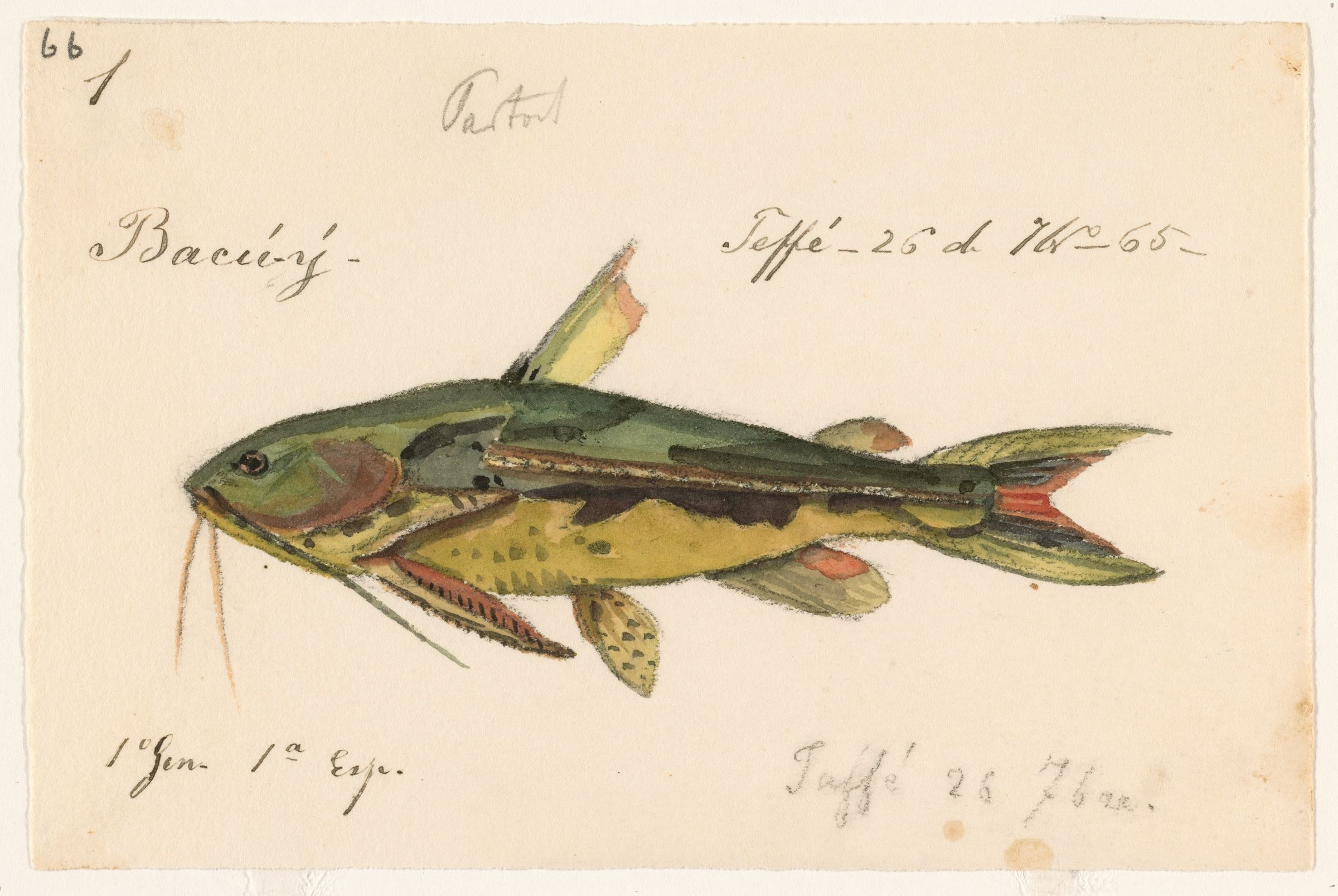

Conservation status
- Least Concern (IUCN 3.1)

Scientific classification
- Kingdom: Animalia
- Phylum: Chordata
- Class: Actinopterygii
- Order: Siluriformes
- Family: Doradidae
- Genus: Anadoras
- Species: A. grypus

Binomial name
- Anadoras grypus (Cope, 1872)

Synonyms
- Doras grypus Cope, 1872

= Anadoras grypus =

Species of fish

Anadoras grypus is a species of thorny catfish found in the upper Amazon basin of Ecuador, Peru, Colombia, and Bolivia. This species grows to a length of 14.6 centimetres (5.7 in) SL.
