= Rhynchodoras xingui =

Conservation status
- Least Concern (IUCN 3.1)

Scientific classification
- Kingdom: Animalia
- Phylum: Chordata
- Class: Actinopterygii
- Order: Siluriformes
- Family: Doradidae
- Genus: Rhynchodoras
- Species: R. xingui

Binomial name
- Rhynchodoras xingui Klausewitz & Rössel, 1961

Species of fish

Rhynchodoras xingui is a species of thorny catfish endemic to Brazil where it is found in the upper Xingu River basin. This species grows to a length of 6.3 centimetres (2.5 in) SL.
