= Trachydoras steindachneri =

Scientific classification
- Kingdom: Animalia
- Phylum: Chordata
- Class: Actinopterygii
- Order: Siluriformes
- Family: Doradidae
- Genus: Trachydoras
- Species: T. steindachneri

Binomial name
- Trachydoras steindachneri (Perugia, 1897)

Synonyms
- Oxydoras steindachneri Perugia, 1897; Oxydoras trachyparia Boulenger, 1898; Trachydoras trachyparia (Boulenger, 1898); Trachydoras atripes C. H. Eigenmann, 1925

Species of fish

Trachydoras steindachneri is a species of thorny catfish native to the Amazon basin of Bolivia, Brazil, Colombia, Ecuador and Peru. This species grows to a length of 8.6 centimetres (3.4 in) SL.
