= Hemidoras morrisi =

Scientific classification
- Domain: Eukaryota
- Kingdom: Animalia
- Phylum: Chordata
- Class: Actinopterygii
- Order: Siluriformes
- Family: Doradidae
- Genus: Hemidoras
- Species: H. morrisi

Binomial name
- Hemidoras morrisi C. H. Eigenmann, 1925

Species of fish

Hemidoras morrisi is a species of thorny catfish found in the Amazon basin of Brazil, Ecuador, Colombia and Peru. This species grows to a length of 14.0 centimetres (5.5 in) SL.
