= Doras micropoeus =

Scientific classification
- Domain: Eukaryota
- Kingdom: Animalia
- Phylum: Chordata
- Class: Actinopterygii
- Order: Siluriformes
- Family: Doradidae
- Genus: Doras
- Species: D. micropoeus

Binomial name
- Doras micropoeus (C. H. Eigenmann, 1912)

Synonyms
- Hemidoras micropoeus Eigenmann, 1912

Species of fish

Doras micropoeus is a species of thorny catfish found in Guyana and Suriname and questionably in French Guiana. This species grows to a length of 35.0 centimetres (13.8 in) SL.
