= Hemidoras stenopeltis =

Scientific classification
- Domain: Eukaryota
- Kingdom: Animalia
- Phylum: Chordata
- Class: Actinopterygii
- Order: Siluriformes
- Family: Doradidae
- Genus: Hemidoras
- Species: H. stenopeltis

Binomial name
- Hemidoras stenopeltis (Kner, 1855)

Synonyms
- Doras stenopeltis Kner, 1855

Species of fish

Hemidoras stenopeltis is a species of thorny catfish found in the Amazon basin of Brazil, Colombia and Peru. This species grows to a length of 12.5 centimetres (4.9 in) SL.
