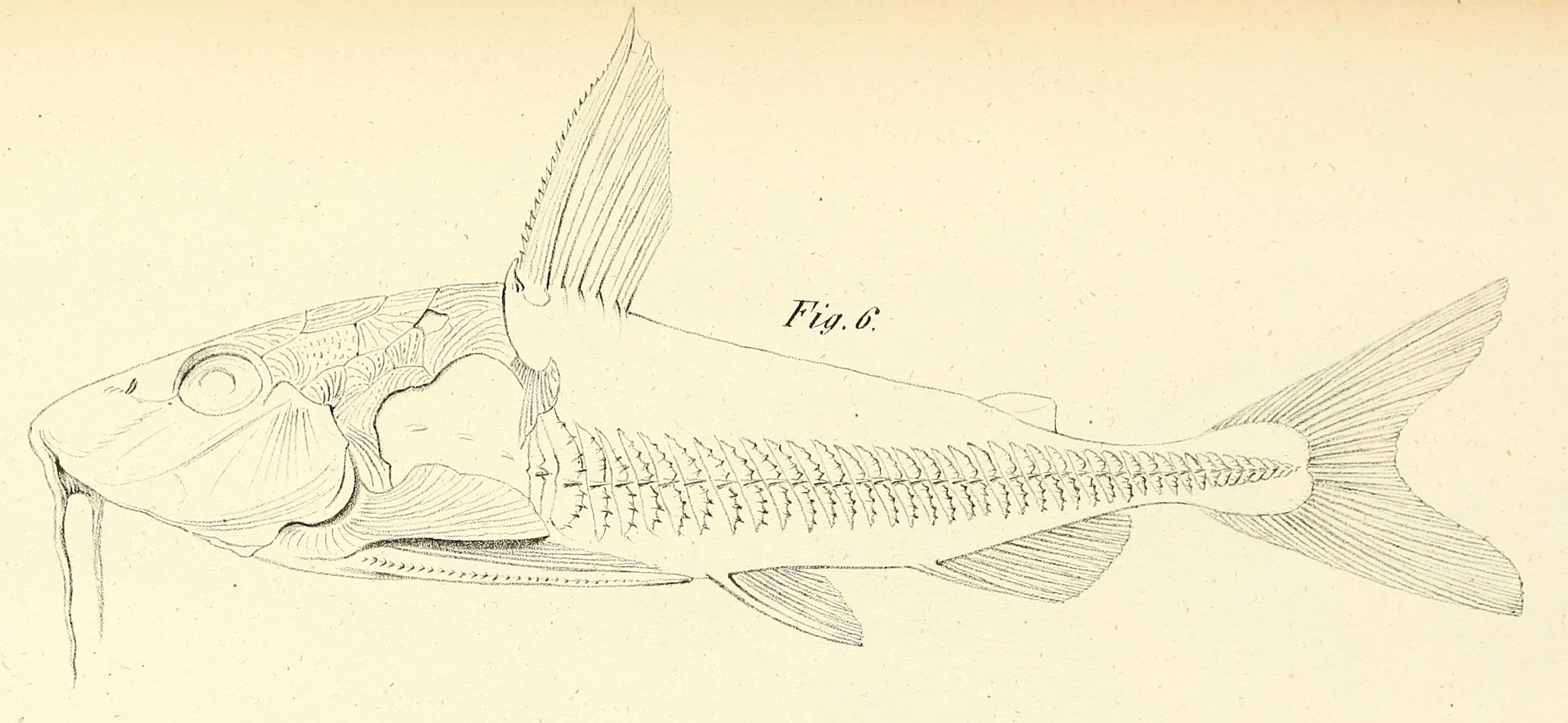

Scientific classification
- Domain: Eukaryota
- Kingdom: Animalia
- Phylum: Chordata
- Class: Actinopterygii
- Order: Siluriformes
- Family: Doradidae
- Genus: Nemadoras
- Species: N. humeralis

Binomial name
- Nemadoras humeralis (Kner, 1855)

Synonyms
- Doras humeralis Kner, 1855; Opsodoras humeralis (Kner, 1855); Oxydoras bachi Boulenger, 1898; Nemadoras bachi (Boulenger, 1898)

= Nemadoras humeralis =

Species of fish

Nemadoras humeralis is a species of thorny catfish native to the Amazon basin where it can be found in Bolivia, Brazil, Colombia and Peru. This species grows to a length of 13.0 centimetres (5.1 in) SL.
