= Tenellus =

Scientific classification
- Kingdom: Animalia
- Phylum: Chordata
- Class: Actinopterygii
- Order: Siluriformes
- Family: Doradidae
- Subfamily: Doradinae
- Genus: Tenellus; Birindelli, 2014

Genus of fishes

Tenellus is a genus of thorny catfishes native to tropical South America.

== Species ==
There are currently 4 recognized species in this genus:

- Tenellus cristinae (Sabaj Pérez, Arce H., Sousa & Birindelli, 2014)
- Tenellus leporhinus (C. H. Eigenmann, 1912)
- Tenellus ternetzi (C. H. Eigenmann, 1925)
- Tenellus trimaculatus (Boulenger, 1898)
