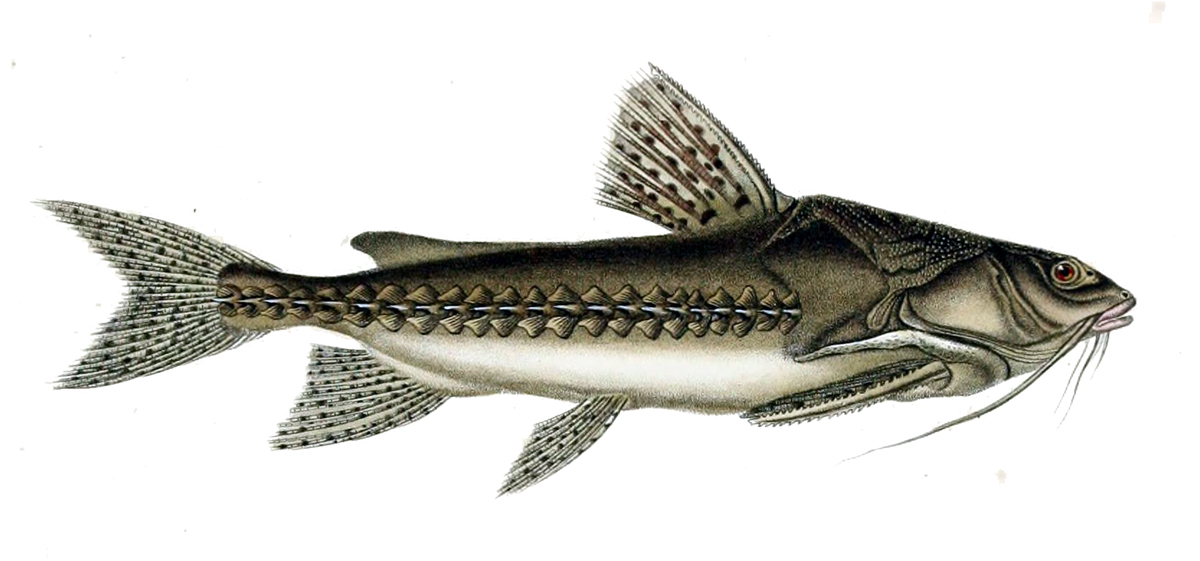
- Pterodoras granulosus

Scientific classification
- Domain: Eukaryota
- Kingdom: Animalia
- Phylum: Chordata
- Class: Actinopterygii
- Order: Siluriformes
- Family: Doradidae
- Subfamily: Doradinae
- Genus: Pterodoras; Bleeker, 1862

Type species
- Doras granulosus Valenciennes 1821

Synonyms
- Apuredoras Fernández-Yépez, 1950; Parapterodoras Risso & Morra, 1964; Sachsdoras Fernández-Yépez, 1968

= Pterodoras =

Genus of fishes

Pterodoras is a small genus of thorny catfishes native to tropical South America.

== Species ==
There are currently two recognized species in this genus:

- Pterodoras granulosus (Valenciennes, 1821) (Granulated catfish)
- Pterodoras rivasi (Fernández-Yépez, 1950)
