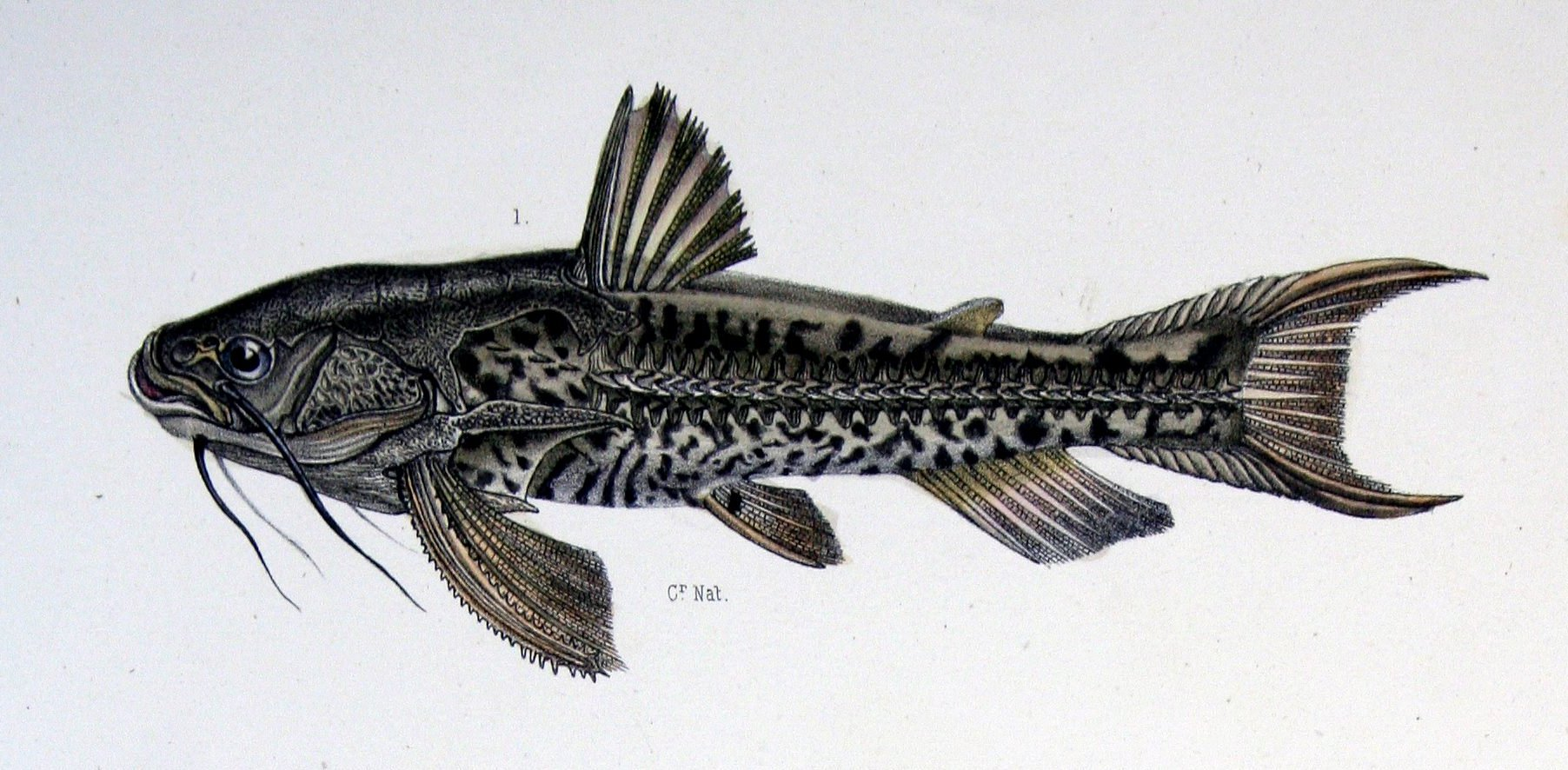
- Anadoras wedellii

Scientific classification
- Kingdom: Animalia
- Phylum: Chordata
- Class: Actinopterygii
- Order: Siluriformes
- Family: Doradidae
- Subfamily: Astrodoradinae
- Genus: Anadoras; C. H. Eigenmann, 1925

Type species
- Doras grypus Cope, 1872

= Anadoras =

Genus of fishes

Anadoras is a genus of thorny catfishes native to tropical South America.

This genus has been assigned to the subfamily Astrodoradinae.

== Species ==
There are currently four recognized species in this genus:

- Anadoras grypus (Cope, 1872)
- Anadoras insculptus (A. Miranda-Ribeiro, 1912)
- Anadoras regani (Steindachner, 1908)
- Anadoras weddellii (Castelnau, 1855)
