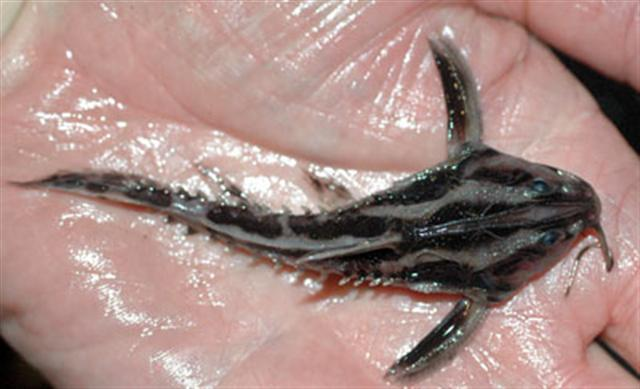
- Megalodoras uranoscopus

Scientific classification
- Domain: Eukaryota
- Kingdom: Animalia
- Phylum: Chordata
- Class: Actinopterygii
- Order: Siluriformes
- Family: Doradidae
- Subfamily: Doradinae
- Genus: Megalodoras; C. H. Eigenmann, 1925

Type species
- Megalodoras irwini Eigenmann 1925

Synonyms
- Hoplodoras Eigenmann, 1925; Deltadoras Fernández-Yépez, 1968

= Megalodoras =

Genus of fishes

Megalodoras is a small genus of thorny catfishes native to tropical South America.

== Species ==
There are currently two recognized species in this genus:

- Megalodoras guayoensis (Fernández-Yépez, 1968)
- Megalodoras uranoscopus (C. H. Eigenmann & R. S. Eigenmann, 1888)
