= Centrodoras brachiatus =

Scientific classification
- Domain: Eukaryota
- Kingdom: Animalia
- Phylum: Chordata
- Class: Actinopterygii
- Order: Siluriformes
- Family: Doradidae
- Genus: Centrodoras
- Species: C. brachiatus

Binomial name
- Centrodoras brachiatus (Cope, 1872)

Synonyms
- Doras brachiatus Cope, 1872; Rhinodoras amazonum Steindachner, 1875

Species of fish

Centrodoras brachiatus is a species of thorny catfish found in the Amazon basin of Brazil, Colombia and Peru. This species grows to a length of 41.0 centimetres (16.1 in) TL.
