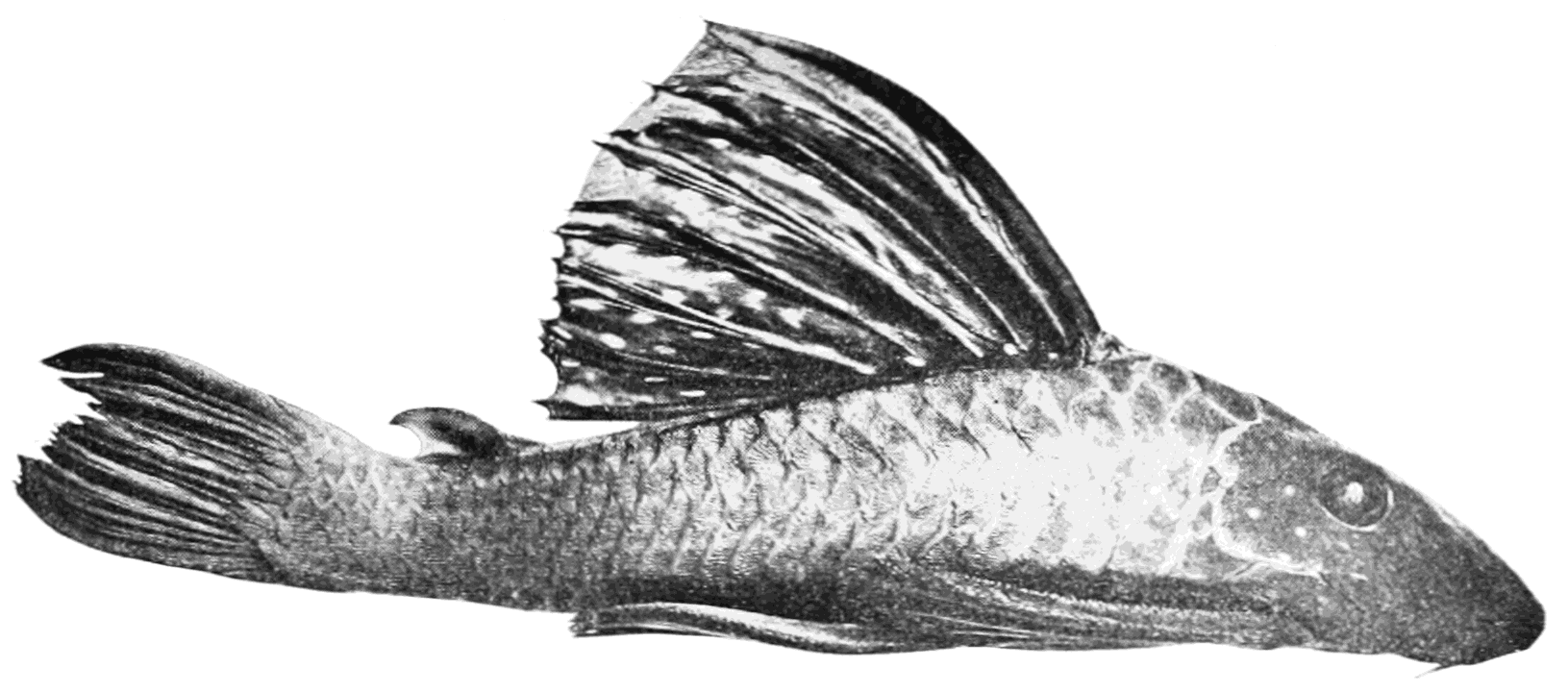

Conservation status
- Least Concern (IUCN 3.1)

Scientific classification
- Kingdom: Animalia
- Phylum: Chordata
- Class: Actinopterygii
- Order: Siluriformes
- Family: Doradidae
- Genus: Lithodoras; Bleeker, 1862
- Species: L. dorsalis

Binomial name
- Lithodoras dorsalis (Valenciennes, 1840)

Synonyms
- Doras dorsalis Valenciennes in Cuvier and Valenciennes, 1840; Doras papilionatus De Filippi, 1853; Doras lithogaster Kner, 1855; Megalodoras paucisquamatus Van der Stigchel, 1946

= Lithodoras =

Genus of fishes

Lithodoras dorsalis, the rock-bacu, is the only species in the genus Lithodoras of the catfish (order Siluriformes) family Doradidae. This species originates from the Amazon basin in Brazil and estuaries near Cayenne, French Guiana. These fish feed on the leaves of macrophytes. When the forests are flooded, they feed exclusively on fruits and seeds, acting as an agent of seed dispersal. Reproduction occurs once a year and juveniles are often seen in large numbers in the estuary of the Amazon. These fish reach a length of 100 centimetres (39 in) TL and a weight of up to 15 kilograms (33 lb).
