= Astrodoras =

Conservation status
- Least Concern (IUCN 3.1)

Scientific classification
- Kingdom: Animalia
- Phylum: Chordata
- Class: Actinopterygii
- Order: Siluriformes
- Family: Doradidae
- Genus: Astrodoras; Bleeker, 1862
- Species: A. asterifrons

Binomial name
- Astrodoras asterifrons (Kner, 1853)

Synonyms
- Doras asterifrons Kner, 1853

Genus of fishes

Astrodoras is a monotypic genus with the only species Astrodoras asterifrons of catfish (order Siluriformes) family Doradidae. This species originates from the Amazon basin of Bolivia and Brazil and reaches a length of about 8 centimetres (3.1 in) SL. This genus is the type genus of the subfamily Astrodoradinae.
