= Kalyptodoras bahiensis =

Conservation status
- Near Threatened (IUCN 3.1)

Scientific classification
- Kingdom: Animalia
- Phylum: Chordata
- Class: Actinopterygii
- Order: Siluriformes
- Family: Doradidae
- Genus: Kalyptodoras; H. Higuchi, Britski & Garavello, 1990
- Species: K. bahiensis

Binomial name
- Kalyptodoras bahiensis H. Higuchi, Britski & Garavello, 1990

Species of fish

Kalyptodoras bahiensis is the only species in the genus Kalyptodoras of the catfish (order Siluriformes) family Doradidae. This species is endemic to Brazil where it is found in the Paraguaçu River in the northeast and reaches a length of 24.5 centimetres (9.6 in) SL.
