= Centrodoras =

Scientific classification
- Domain: Eukaryota
- Kingdom: Animalia
- Phylum: Chordata
- Class: Actinopterygii
- Order: Siluriformes
- Family: Doradidae
- Subfamily: Doradinae
- Genus: Centrodoras; C. H. Eigenmann, 1925

Type species
- Doras brachiatus Cope 1872

Genus of fishes

Centrodoras is a small genus of thorny catfishes found in the Amazon basin of South America.

== Species ==
There are currently two described species in this genus:

- Centrodoras brachiatus (Cope, 1872)
- Centrodoras hasemani (Steindachner, 1915)
