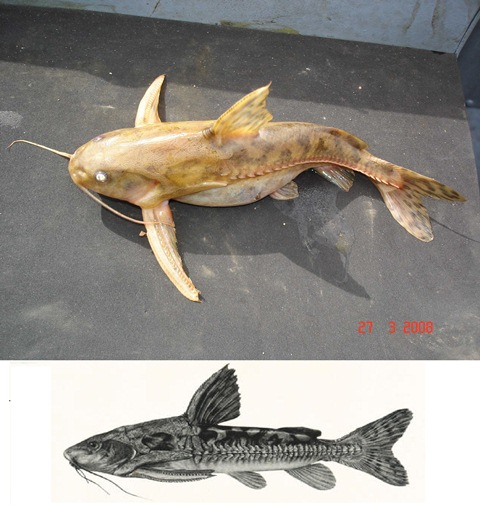

Conservation status
- Least Concern (IUCN 3.1)

Scientific classification
- Kingdom: Animalia
- Phylum: Chordata
- Class: Actinopterygii
- Order: Siluriformes
- Family: Doradidae
- Genus: Franciscodoras; C. H. Eigenmann, 1925
- Species: F. marmoratus

Binomial name
- Franciscodoras marmoratus (Lütken, 1874)

Synonyms
- Doras marmoratus Lütken, 1874

= Franciscodoras =

Genus of fishes

Franciscodoras marmoratus is the only species in the genus Franciscodoras of the catfish (order Siluriformes) family Doradidae. This species is endemic to Brazil where it is found in the São Francisco River basin and reaches a length of 36 centimetres (14 in) TL.
