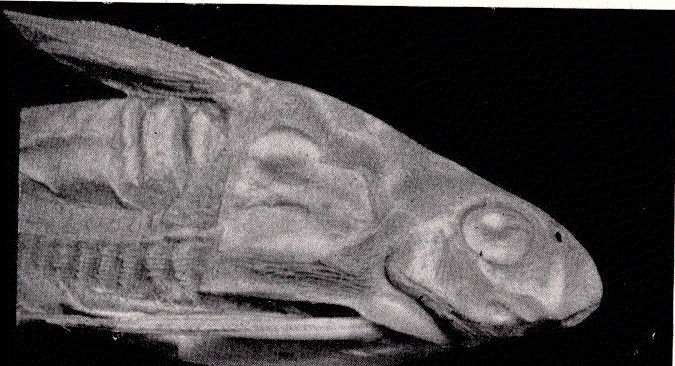
- Trachydoras paraguayensis

Scientific classification
- Kingdom: Animalia
- Phylum: Chordata
- Class: Actinopterygii
- Order: Siluriformes
- Family: Doradidae
- Subfamily: Doradinae
- Genus: Trachydoras; C. H. Eigenmann, 1925

= Trachydoras =

Genus of fishes

Trachydoras is a genus of fish in the family Doradidae native to South America.

== Species ==
There are currently 6 recognized species in this genus:

- Trachydoras brevis (Kner, 1853)
- Trachydoras gepharti Sabaj Pérez & Arce H., 2017
- Trachydoras microstomus (C. H. Eigenmann, 1912)
- Trachydoras nattereri (Steindachner, 1881)
- Trachydoras paraguayensis (C. H. Eigenmann & Ward, 1907)
- Trachydoras steindachneri (Perugia, 1897)
