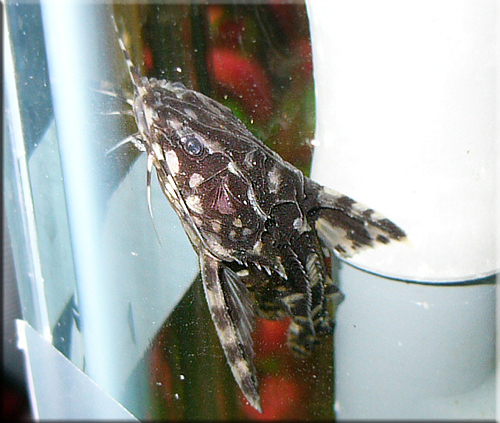

Scientific classification
- Domain: Eukaryota
- Kingdom: Animalia
- Phylum: Chordata
- Class: Actinopterygii
- Order: Siluriformes
- Family: Doradidae
- Subfamily: Doradinae
- Genus: Agamyxis; Cope, 1878

Type species
- Doras pectinifrons Cope, 1870

= Agamyxis =

Genus of thorny catfishes

Agamyxis is a genus of thorny catfishes.

== Species ==
There are currently two recognized species in this genus:

- Agamyxis albomaculatus (W. K. H. Peters, 1877) (Spiny cat-fish)
- Agamyxis pectinifrons (Cope, 1870) (Spotted Raphael catfish, Spotted doradid, Whitebarred catfish)

== Distribution ==
This genus is found in tropical South America.

== Description ==
Both species reach about 15 centimetres (6 in) SL. These species both appear very similar; A. albomaculatus might be slimmer, have more spots and a different pattern on its caudal fin.

== Ecology ==
These catfish are able to make sounds by grinding their pectoral fin bones against their shoulder bones. They can live for 17 years.

== In the aquarium ==
Both species in this genus are popular in the aquarium trade.

== See also ==
- List of freshwater aquarium fish species
