= Scorpiodoras =

Scientific classification
- Kingdom: Animalia
- Phylum: Chordata
- Class: Actinopterygii
- Order: Siluriformes
- Family: Doradidae
- Subfamily: Astrodoradinae
- Genus: Scorpiodoras; C. H. Eigenmann, 1925

Type species
- Scorpiodoras heckelii Kner, 1855

Synonyms
- Autanadoras Fernández-Yépez, 1950

Genus of fishes

Scorpiodoras is a genus of thorny catfishes native to tropical South America.

== Species ==
There are currently three described species in this genus:

- Scorpiodoras bolivarensis (Fernández-Yépez, 1968)
- Scorpiodoras heckelii (Kner, 1855)
- Scorpiodoras liophysus Sousa & Birindelli, 2011
