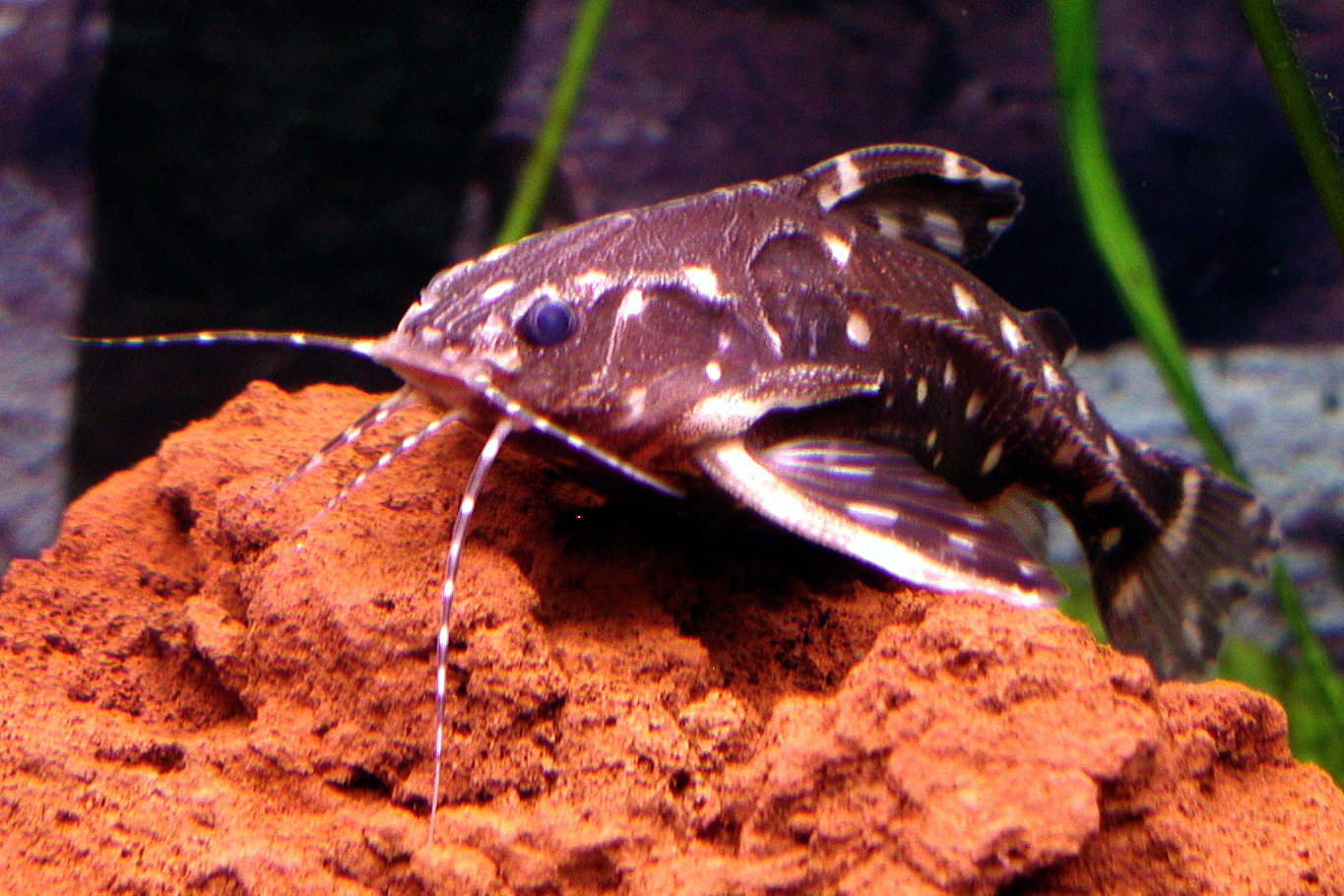

Scientific classification
- Kingdom: Animalia
- Phylum: Chordata
- Class: Actinopterygii
- Order: Siluriformes
- Family: Doradidae
- Genus: Agamyxis
- Species: A. pectinifrons

Binomial name
- Agamyxis pectinifrons (Cope, 1870)

Synonyms
- Doras pectinifrons Cope, 1870; Doras flavopictus Steindachner, 1908

= Agamyxis pectinifrons =

Spotted raphael catfish

Species of fish

Agamyxis pectinifrons, the spotted talking catfish, spotted raphael catfish or whitebarred catfish, is a species of thorny catfish found in the Amazon basin where it has been recorded from Bolivia, Brazil, Colombia and Peru. This species grows to a length of 15 centimetres (5.9 in) SL.

== In the aquarium ==
A. pectinifrons is a popular aquarium fish and is often sold as the spotted raphael catfish or spotted talking catfish. It is recommended, due to the spines on this fish which would tear up a conventional net, that it is preferable to move these fish by hand. These fish need a dark refuge to hide in during the day.

It is one of a few species of fish that make clicks that are audible to humans outside of an aquarium itself.
