= Hemidoras =

Scientific classification
- Kingdom: Animalia
- Phylum: Chordata
- Class: Actinopterygii
- Order: Siluriformes
- Family: Doradidae
- Subfamily: Doradinae
- Genus: Hemidoras; Bleeker, 1858

Type species
- Doras (Oxydoras) stenopeltis Kner, 1855

Synonyms
- Opsodoras C. H. Eigenmann, 1925

Genus of fishes

Hemidoras is a small genus of thorny catfishes native to the Amazon basin in South America.

== Species ==
There are currently five recognized species in this genus:

- Hemidoras boulengeri Steindachner, 1915
- Hemidoras morei (Steindachner, 1881)
- Hemidoras morrisi C. H. Eigenmann, 1925
- Hemidoras stenopeltis (Kner, 1855)
- Hemidoras stuebelii (Steindachner, 1882)
