= Nemadoras =

Scientific classification
- Kingdom: Animalia
- Phylum: Chordata
- Class: Actinopterygii
- Order: Siluriformes
- Family: Doradidae
- Subfamily: Doradinae
- Genus: Nemadoras; C. H. Eigenmann, 1925

Type species
- Oxydoras elongatus Boulenger, 1898

Genus of fishes

Nemadoras is a genus of thorny catfishes native to tropical South America.

== Species ==
There are currently 3 recognized species in this genus:

- Nemadoras elongatus Boulenger, 1898
- Nemadoras hemipeltis C. H. Eigenmann, 1925
- Nemadoras humeralis Kner, 1855
