= Hypodoras =

Conservation status
- Data Deficient (IUCN 3.1)

Scientific classification
- Kingdom: Animalia
- Phylum: Chordata
- Class: Actinopterygii
- Order: Siluriformes
- Family: Doradidae
- Genus: Hypodoras; C. H. Eigenmann, 1925
- Species: H. forficulatus

Binomial name
- Hypodoras forficulatus C. H. Eigenmann, 1925

Genus of fishes

Hypodoras forficulatus is the only species in the genus Hypodoras of the catfish (order Siluriformes) family Doradidae. This species is endemic to Peru where it is found in the upper Amazon basin and reaches a length of 10.4 centimetres (4.1 in) SL.
