= Centrodoras hasemani =

Scientific classification
- Kingdom: Animalia
- Phylum: Chordata
- Class: Actinopterygii
- Order: Siluriformes
- Family: Doradidae
- Genus: Centrodoras
- Species: C. hasemani

Binomial name
- Centrodoras hasemani (Steindachner, 1915)

Species of fish

Centrodoras hasemani is a species of thorny catfish endemic to Brazil where it occurs in the Rio Negro basin. This species grows to a length of 21.0 centimetres (8.3 in) SL.

It is named for zoologist and explorer John Diederich Haseman.
