= Doraops zuloagai =

Conservation status
- Least Concern (IUCN 3.1)

Scientific classification
- Kingdom: Animalia
- Phylum: Chordata
- Class: Actinopterygii
- Order: Siluriformes
- Family: Doradidae
- Genus: Doraops; L. P. Schultz, 1944
- Species: D. zuloagai

Binomial name
- Doraops zuloagai L. P. Schultz, 1944

Species of fish

Doraops zuloagai is the only species in the genus Doraops of the catfish (order Siluriformes) family Doradidae. This species originates from and Lake Maracaibo basin as well as the Apón River, Santa Ana River, Catatumbo River, Escalante River and Rio de Los Pajaros basins of Colombia and Venezuela. These fish prefer muddy backwaters and feed on insects, worms, small crabs, and snails. They reach a length of 50 centimetres (20 in) SL and are a component of local commercial fisheries.
