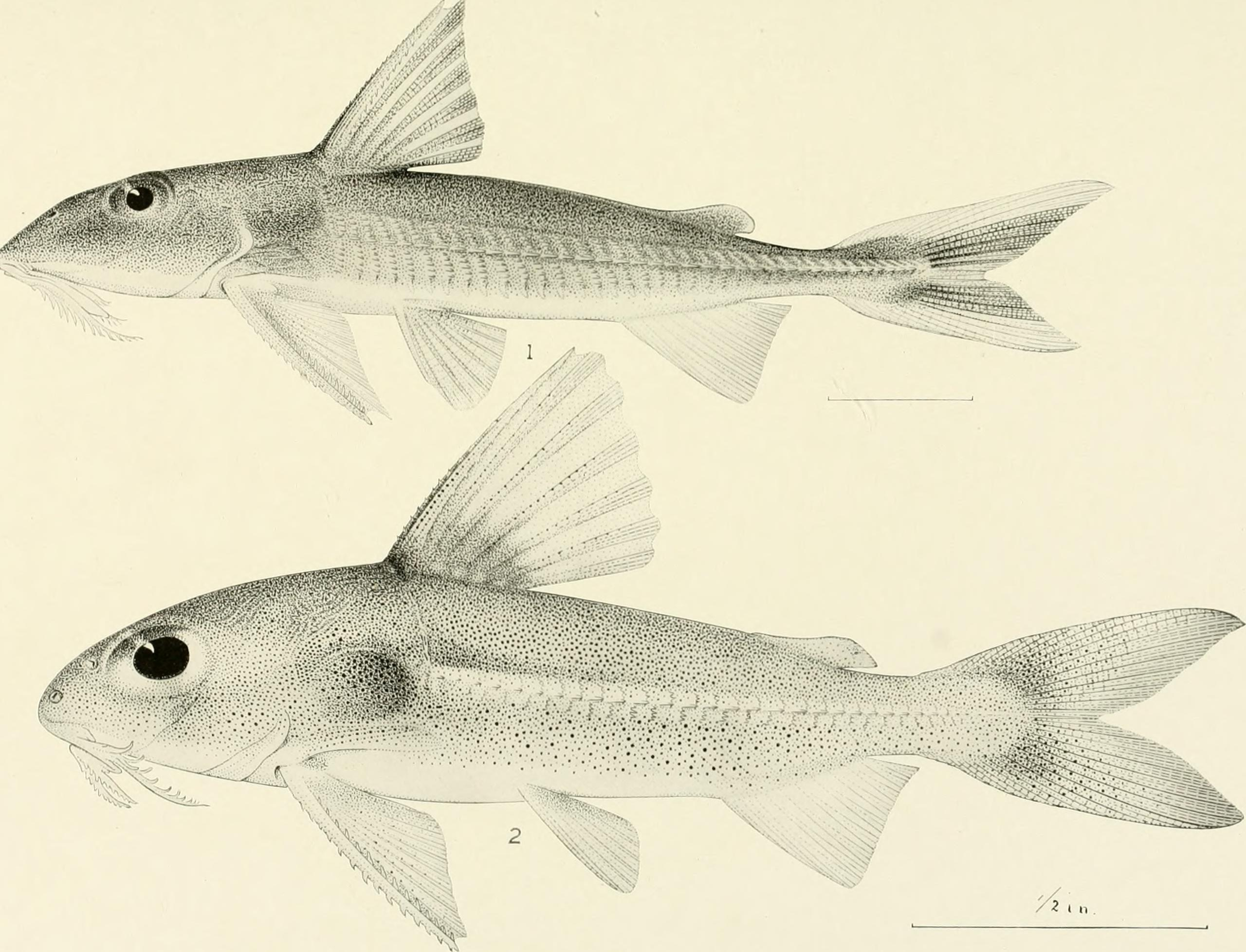
- Trachydoras microstomus bottom

Scientific classification
- Kingdom: Animalia
- Phylum: Chordata
- Class: Actinopterygii
- Division: Teleostei
- Order: Siluriformes
- Family: Doradidae
- Genus: Trachydoras
- Species: T. microstomus

Binomial name
- Trachydoras microstomus (C. H. Eigenmann, 1912)

Synonyms
- Hemidoras microstomus Eigenmann, 1912; Anduzedoras microstomas (Eigenmann, 1912)

= Trachydoras microstomus =

Species of fish

Trachydoras microstomus is a species of thorny catfish that is native to Bolivia, Brazil, Colombia, Guyana, Peru and Venezuela. It occurs in the Essequibo, Orinoco and Amazon basins. This species grows to a length of 5.9 centimetres (2.3 in) SL.
