= Centrochir =

Scientific classification
- Kingdom: Animalia
- Phylum: Chordata
- Class: Actinopterygii
- Order: Siluriformes
- Family: Doradidae
- Subfamily: Doradinae
- Genus: Centrochir; Agassiz in Spix & Agassiz, 1829

Type species
- Doras crocodili Humboldt, 1821

Genus of fishes

Centrochir is a small genus of thorny catfishes native to freshwater habitats in subtropical and tropical South America.

It is the sister genus of the Raphael catfish genus Platydoras.

== Species ==
There are currently two recognized species in this genus:

- Centrochir birindellii (Sousa, Chaves, Akama, Zuanon & Sabaj, 2018)
- Centrochir crocodili (Humboldt, 1821)
