= Magdalena River =

River in Colombia

Magdalena
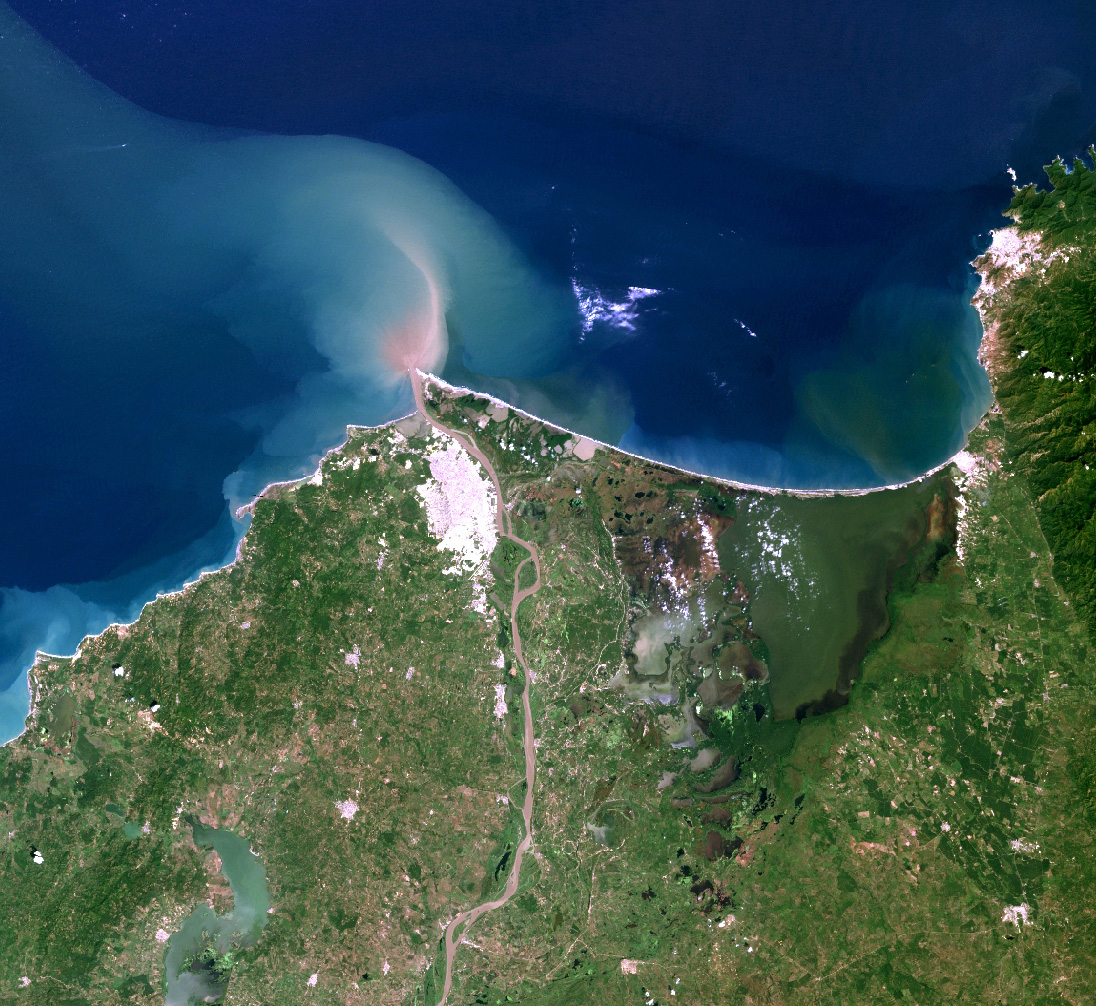
- The delta of the Magdalena River

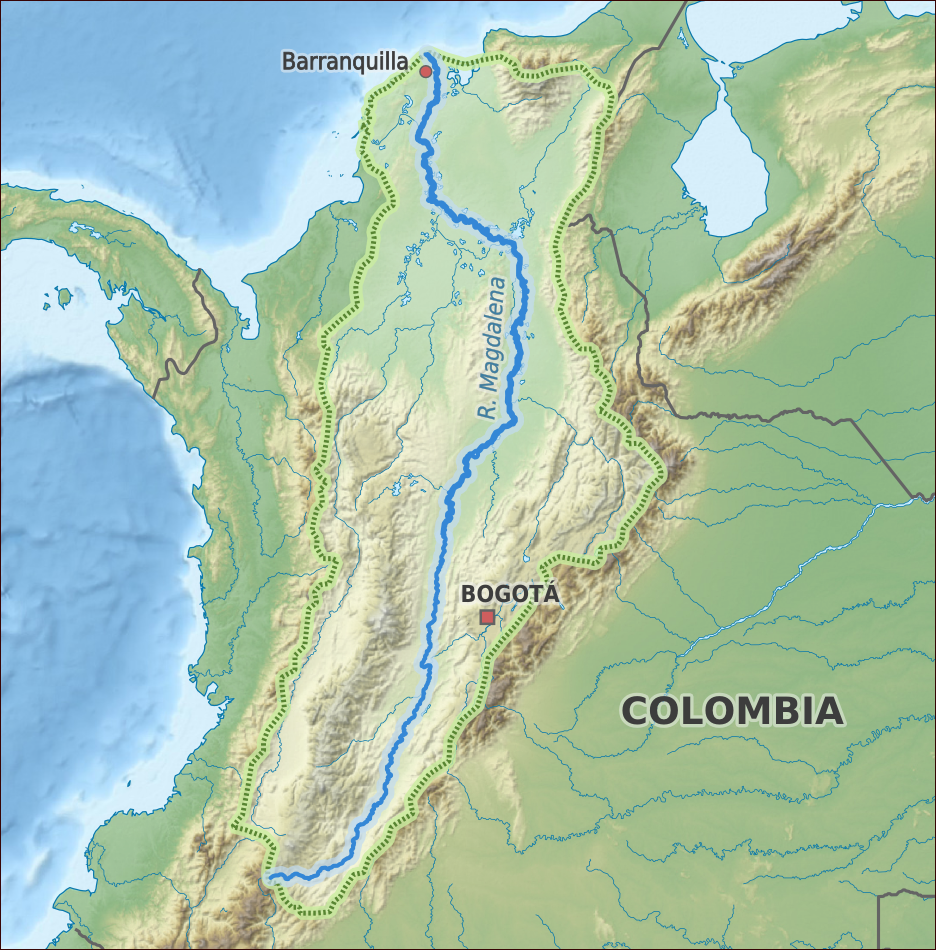
- Map of the Magdalena River watershed
- Etymology: Biblical figure Mary Magdalene

Location
- Country: Colombia
- Cities: Neiva; Girardot; Honda; La Dorada; Puerto Boyacá; Puerto Berrío; Barrancabermeja; Santa Cruz de Mompox; Magangué; Barranquilla

Physical characteristics
- Source: La Magdalena lagoon
  - location: Colombian Massif, Colombia
  - coordinates: 1°56′3″N 76°36′29″W
  - elevation: 3,685 m (12,090 ft)
- Mouth: Caribbean Sea
  - location: Barranquilla, Colombia
  - coordinates: 11°7′0″N 74°51′0″W
  - elevation: 0 m (0 ft)
- Length: 1,528 km (949 mi)
- Basin size: 257,438 km^{2} (99,397 sq mi) to 271,807 km^{2} (104,945 mi^{2})
- Discharge
  - location: Calamar, Bolívar
  - average: (Period: 1975–1995) 7,200 m^{3}/s (250,000 cu ft/s) (Period: 1991–2020) 8,058 m^{3}/s (284,600 cu ft/s)
  - minimum: 2,000 m^{3}/s (71,000 cu ft/s)
  - maximum: 12,000 m^{3}/s (420,000 cu ft/s)

Basin features
- Tributaries
  - left: Páez, Saldaña, La Miel, Nare, Cauca, San Jorge
  - right: Cabrera, Bogotá, Negro, Carare, Sogamoso, Cesar

Ramsar Wetland
- Official name: Sistema Delta Estuarino del Río Magdalena, Ciénaga Grande de Santa Marta
- Designated: 18 June 1998
- Reference no.: 951

The Magdalena River (Spanish: Río Magdalena, Spanish pronunciation: [ˈri.o maɣðaˈlena]; less commonly Rio Grande de la Magdalena) is the main river of Colombia, flowing northward about 1,528 kilometres (949 mi) through the western half of the country. It takes its name from the biblical figure Mary Magdalene. It is navigable through much of its lower reaches, in spite of the shifting sand bars at the mouth of its delta, as far as Honda, at the downstream base of its rapids. It flows through the Magdalena River Valley.

Its drainage basin covers a surface of 273,000 square kilometres (105,000 sq mi), which is 24% of the country's area and where 66% of its population lives.

== Course ==
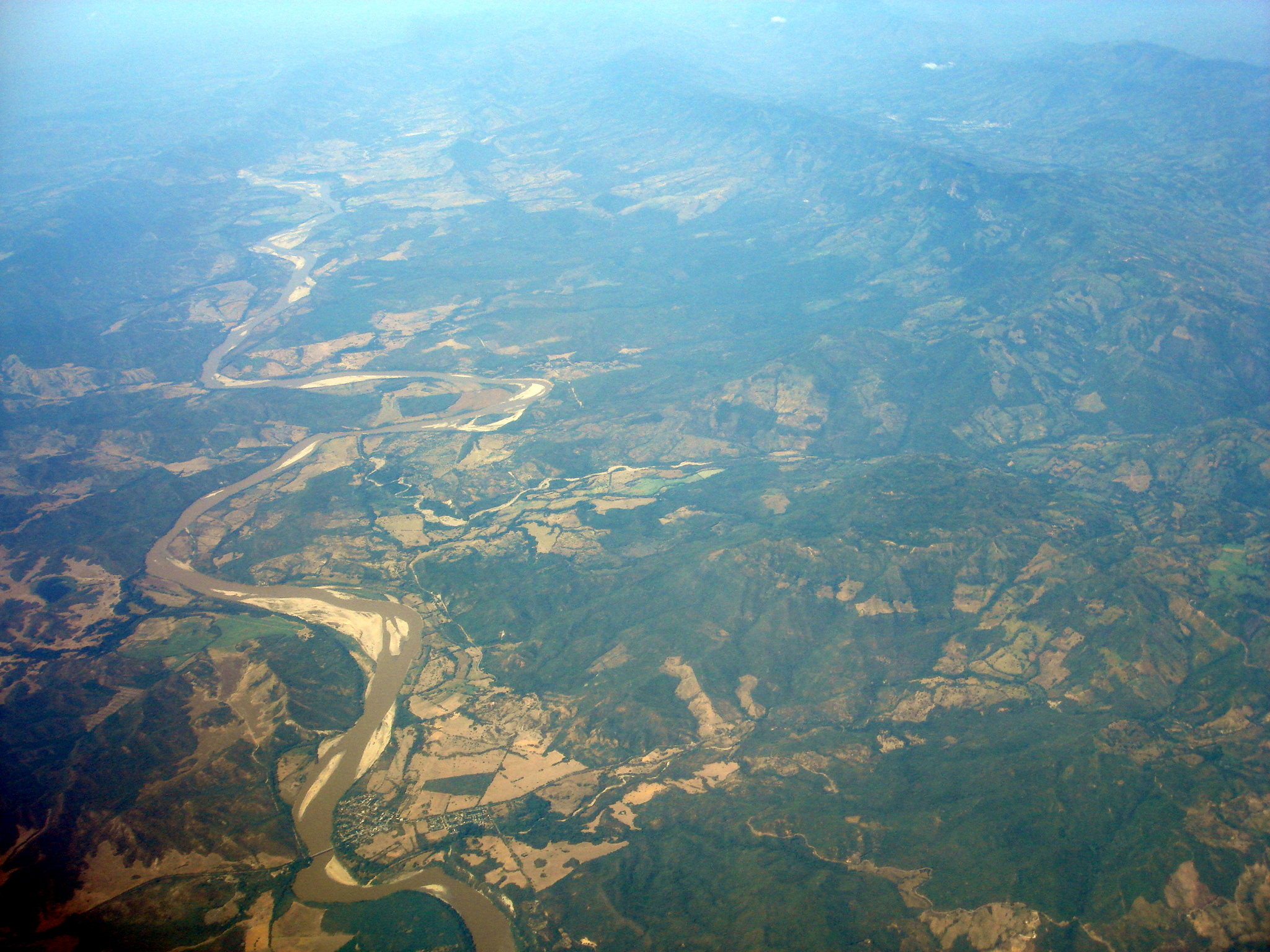
Magdalena River in Cundinamarca–Tolima

The Magdalena River is the largest river system of the northern Andes, with a length of 1,528 km. Its headwaters are in the south of Colombia, where the Andean subranges Cordillera Central and Cordillera Oriental separate, in Huila Department. The river runs east then north in a great valley between the two cordilleras. It reaches the coastal plain at about nine degrees north, then runs west for about 100 km (62 mi), then north again, reaching the Caribbean Sea at the city of Barranquilla in the zone known as Bocas de Ceniza.

The Magdalena River Valley was formed after a series of tectonic formed depressions that filled up with continental sediment in the Tertiary period. These sediments came from the Central Ranges of the Colombian Andes. The Magdalena Valley, subdivided into the Upper (VSM), Middle (VMM) and Lower Magdalena Valleys (VIM), is an important area for oil exploration in Colombia.

== Flora and fauna ==
=== Fish ===
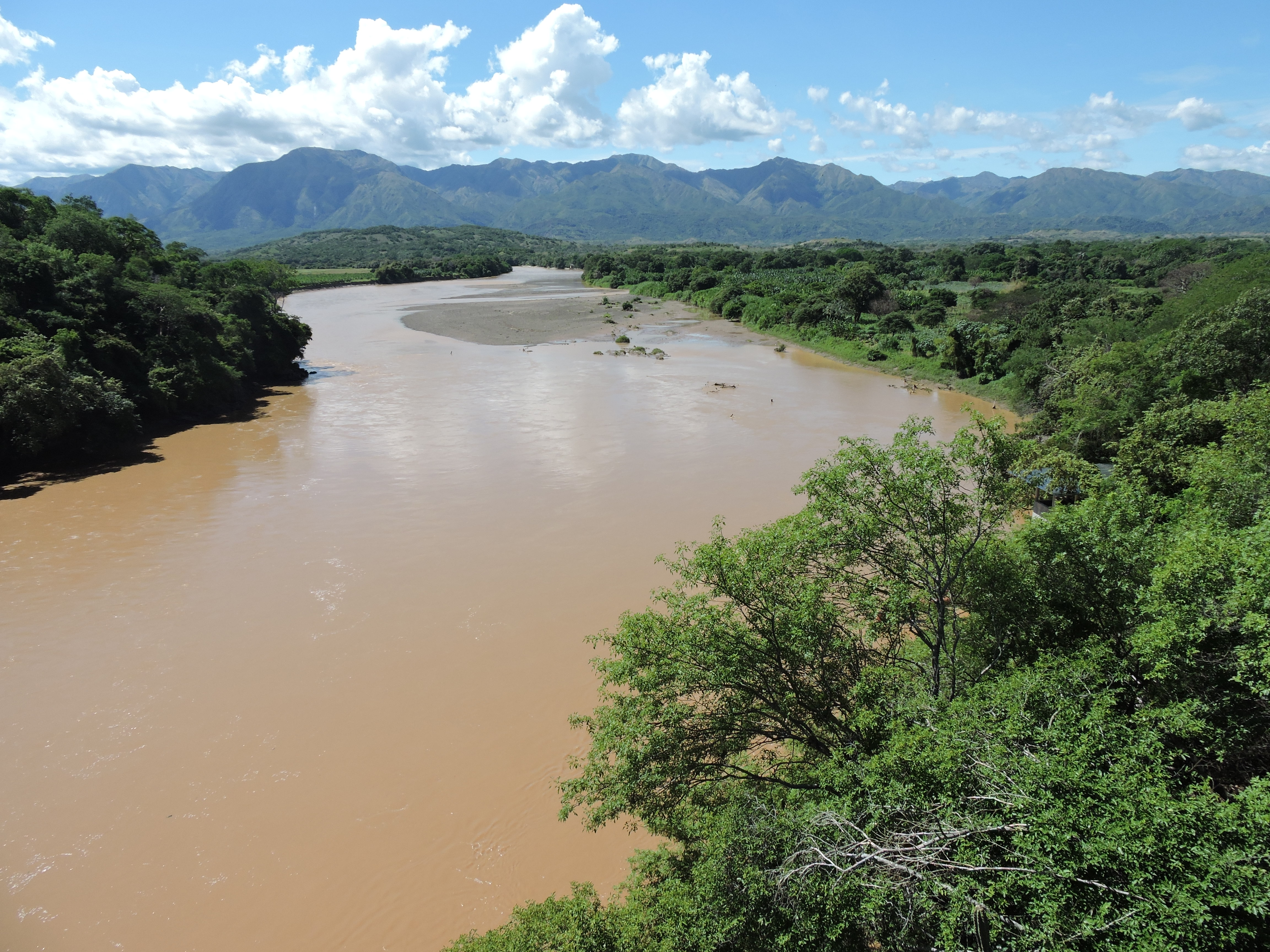
The river near Villavieja, Huila

The Magdalena River basin, which includes the Cauca River and other tributaries, are very rich in fish. As of 2008, 213 fish species were known from the basin. Since then several new species have been described from the basin such as five Hemibrycon in 2013, two Ancistrus in 2013 and a Farlowella in 2014. Among the more famous species in the basin are Kronoheros umbriferus, Ctenolucius hujeta, Geophagus steindachneri, Ichthyoelephas longirostris, Panaque cochliodon, Pimelodus blochii, Potamotrygon magdalenae, Prochilodus magdalenae, Pseudoplatystoma magdaleniatum and Salminus affinis. About 55% of the fish species in the basin are endemic, including four endemic genera: The catfish Centrochir and Eremophilus, and the characids Carlastyanax (often included in Astyanax) and Genycharax. In general, the fish fauna shows connections with surrounding basins, notably Atrato and Maracaibo, but to a lesser extent also Amazon–Orinoco.

The most productive fishing areas in Colombia are in the basin, but there has been a drastic decrease in the annual harvest with a fall of about 90% between 1975 and 2008. The primary threats are pollution (such as human waste, mining, farming and deforestation causing siltation) and habitat loss (such a dams). Additional dams are being constructed, including El Quimbo (opened in 2015) and Ituango (expected operational in 2018), which has caused some controversy. As a result of the pollution, heavy metals have also been detected in some commercially important fish in the river. As of 2002, 19 fish species in the river basin were recognized as threatened.

=== Other animals ===
The Magdalena River and its valley crosses a wide variety of ecosystems, like páramo in its headwaters, dry forest in the upper part of its valley, rainforest in its middle course, and swamps and wetlands in its lower course. The spectacled caiman, green iguana and brown pelican are abundant in these ecosystems but other animal species like the West Indian manatee, Magdalena tinamou, Todd's parakeet, American crocodile, Colombian slider, Magdalena River turtle, Dahl's toad-headed turtle and red-footed tortoise are in danger of extinction.

In addition, there is a possible risk posed by invasive hippopotamus. Originally imported by Pablo Escobar, these hippopotamuses became feral following his demise, and have since expanded beyond their original home on Hacienda Napoles into nearby regions of the Magdalena River.

The Magdalena River Valley is home to a species of butterfly, Magdalena Valley ringlet or Splendeuptychia ackeryi, first identified in 2009. There are many endangered mammals and birds found in the region, including the brown spider monkey and the endemic blue-billed curassow and white-mantled barbet. These species are threatened by habitat loss, among other factors.

=== Flora ===
The first recorded European contact with the potato was in 1537 in the Magdalena Valley. The Spanish invaders became familiar with the crop and it was probably around 1570 when a Spanish ship first introduced potatoes to Europe.

== History ==
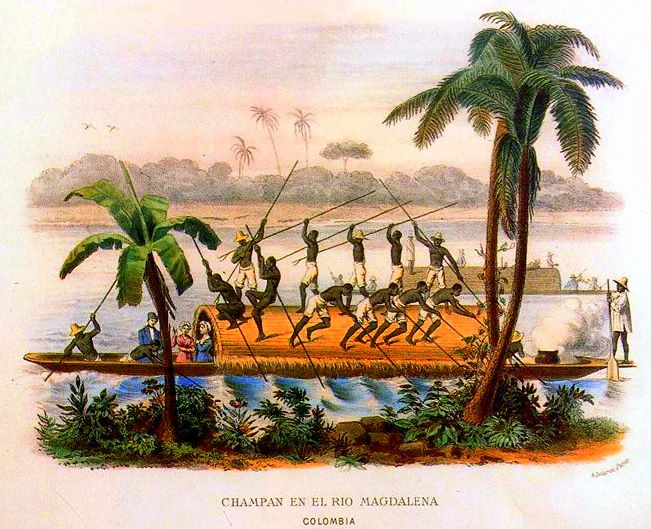
Champán on the Magdalena, c. 1860, aquatint by Ramón Torres Méndez

Due to its geographical position in the north of South America, the Magdalena River was since precolumbian times a route towards the interior of present-day Colombia and Ecuador. Several Carib-speaking peoples such as the Panche and the Yariguí ascended through the western bank of the river, while its eastern portion was inhabited by the Muisca civilization, which called the river Yuma.

Likewise, the Spanish conquistadores who arrived to today's Colombia early in the 16th century used the river to push to the wild and mountainous inland after Rodrigo de Bastidas discovered and named the river on April 1, 1501. During the Spanish colonization of the Americas, the river was the only transport link communicating Bogotá with the Caribbean Sea port Cartagena de Indias and thus with Europe.

The Magdalena Campaign of Pierre Labatut and Simón Bolívar took place along the Magdalena River.

In 1825, the Congress of Colombia awarded a concession to establish steam navigation in the Magdalena River to Juan Bernardo Elbers, but his company closed shortly after. By 1845, steamboats regularly travelled on the river until 1961, when the last steamers ceased operation.

Yuvelis Morales Blanco earned the Goldman Prize for her activism against fracking in the Magdalena River, which Ecopetrol was seeking to do.

== River transport and tourism ==
=== Modern river cruising ===
Overnight river cruising returned to the Magdalena River in 2025, marking the first regular passenger cruises since the early 1970s. AmaWaterways, in partnership with Metropolitan Touring, launched seven-night itineraries between Barranquilla and Cartagena with calls at towns such as Mompox, Magangué and Calamar. The company's first ship, AmaMagdalena, began service in April 2025, followed by sister ship AmaMelodia later that year. Multiple operators are planning to launch Magdalena River cruises in 2026 and 2027. Colombia's national tourism site highlights Magdalena River cruise experiences as part of the country's growing river tourism offerings.

== In mass media ==
Much of the film Love in the Time of Cholera takes place in the historic, walled city of Cartagena in Colombia. Some screenshots showed the Magdalena River and the Sierra Nevada de Santa Marta mountain range.

The General in His Labyrinth, by Gabriel García Márquez, is a fictionalized account of the final voyage of Simón Bolívar down the Magdalena River, where he revisits many cities and villages along the river.

In Magdalena: River of Dreams (Knopf, 2020), Canadian writer, anthropologist, and explorer Wade Davis travels the length of the river by boat, on foot, by car, and on horseback combining descriptions of nature with episodes from Colombian history.
