= Hassar (fish) =

Scientific classification
- Domain: Eukaryota
- Kingdom: Animalia
- Phylum: Chordata
- Class: Actinopterygii
- Order: Siluriformes
- Family: Doradidae
- Subfamily: Doradinae
- Genus: Hassar; C. H. Eigenmann & R. S. Eigenmann, 1888

Type species
- Oxydoras orestis Steindachner, 1875

Genus of fishes

Hassar is a genus of thorny catfishes native to South America.

== Species ==
There are currently five recognized species in this genus:

- Hassar affinis (Steindachner, 1881)
- Hassar gabiru Birindelli, Fayal & Wosiacki, 2011
- Hassar orestis (Steindachner, 1875)
- Hassar shewellkeimi Sabaj Pérez & Birindelli, 2013
- Hassar wilderi Kindle, 1895

== Description ==
Like other doradids, Hassar species have a row of scutes on each side of their body, though they are more subdued. Hassar species grow to approximately 15.7–25.0 centimetres (6.2–9.8 in) SL.

== In the aquarium ==
Hassar species are very rarely imported for the aquarium hobby, and the most commonly imported species is H. orestis. Care of this species is not straightforward; they are hard to acclimate if not in good condition at the point of sale. They are always wild caught. However, once settled in they are easier to care for. These fish should be provided with dense vegetation to feel comfortable. They are not aggressive, though smaller fish are very shy in the presence of larger fish.
