= Ossancora =

Scientific classification
- Kingdom: Animalia
- Phylum: Chordata
- Class: Actinopterygii
- Order: Siluriformes
- Family: Doradidae
- Subfamily: Doradinae
- Genus: Ossancora; Birindelli & Sabaj Pérez, 2011

Type species
- Doras fimbriatus Kner, 1855

Genus of fishes

Ossancora is a genus of thorny catfish native to tropical South America.

== Species ==
There are currently four species considered to belong to this genus:

- Ossancora asterophysa Birindelli & Sabaj Pérez, 2011
- Ossancora eigenmanni (Boulenger, 1895)
- Ossancora fimbriatus (Kner, 1855)
- Ossancora punctatus (Kner, 1853)
