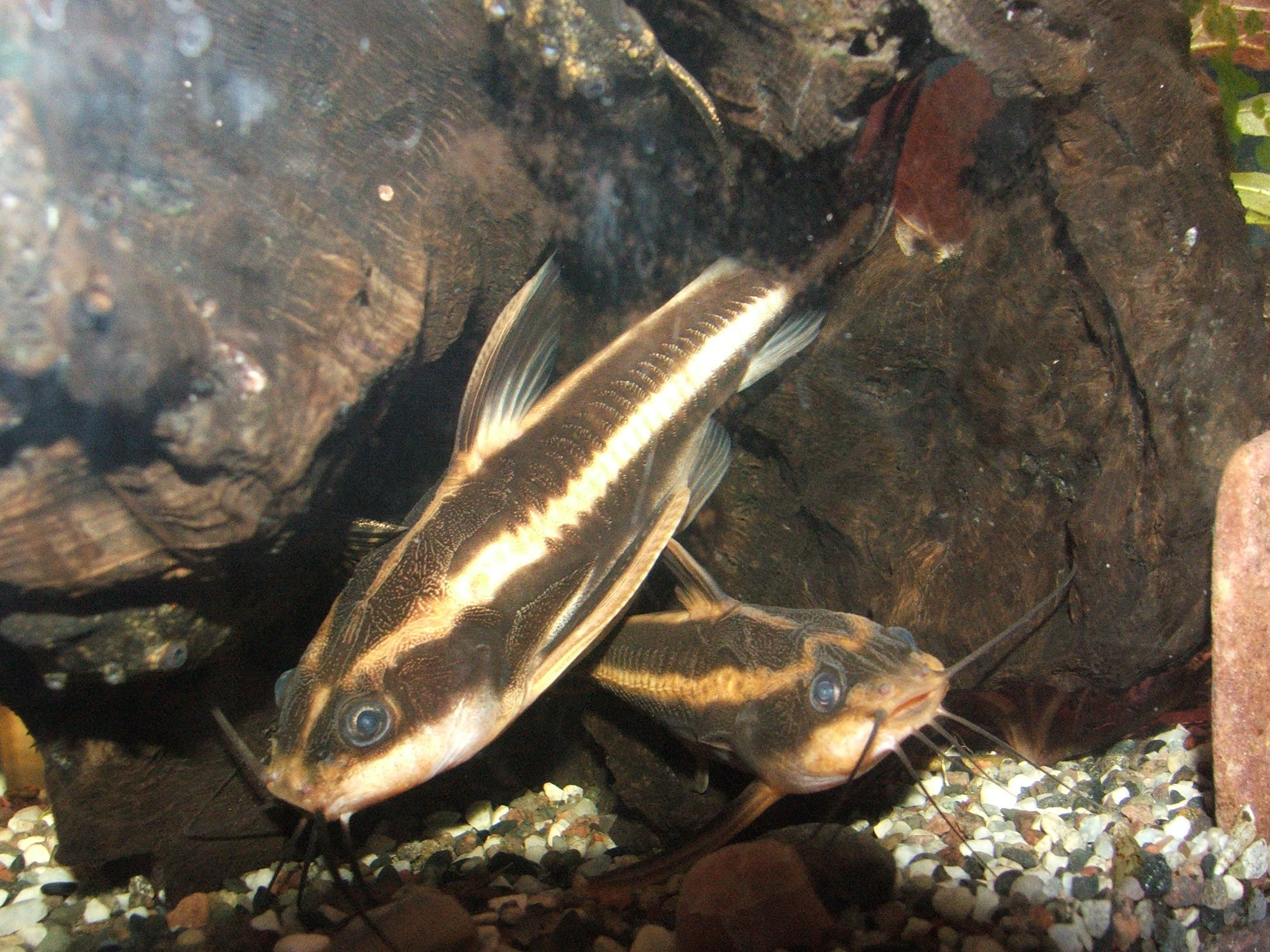
- Platydoras armatulus

Scientific classification
- Kingdom: Animalia
- Phylum: Chordata
- Class: Actinopterygii
- Order: Siluriformes
- Family: Doradidae
- Subfamily: Platydorinae
- Genus: Platydoras; Bleeker, 1862

Type species
- Silurus costatus Linnaeus, 1758

= Platydoras =

Genus of fishes

Platydoras is a small genus of thorny catfishes native to freshwater habitats in subtropical and tropical South America.

== Species ==
There are currently four recognized species in this genus:

- Platydoras armatulus (Valenciennes, 1840) (Southern striped raphael)
- Platydoras brachylecis Piorski, Garavello, Arce H. & Sabaj Pérez, 2008
- Platydoras costatus (Linnaeus, 1758) (Raphael catfish)
- Platydoras hancockii (Valenciennes, 1840) (Blue-eye catfish)
