= Wertheimeria maculata =

Conservation status
- Least Concern (IUCN 3.1)

Scientific classification
- Kingdom: Animalia
- Phylum: Chordata
- Class: Actinopterygii
- Order: Siluriformes
- Family: Doradidae
- Genus: Wertheimeria; Steindachner, 1877
- Species: W. maculata

Binomial name
- Wertheimeria maculata Steindachner, 1877

Species of fish

Wertheimeria maculata is the only species in the genus Wertheimeria of the catfish (order Siluriformes) family Doradidae. This species is endemic to Brazil and is found in the Jequitinhonha and Pardo Rivers. These fish reach a length of 30.0 centimetres (11.8 in) SL. Within its restricted range, W. maculata faces strong human habitat disturbances such as siltation, habitat fragmentation, pollution, and introduced species. This fish has been placed as the sister taxon to all other doradids.
