= Anduzedoras =

Conservation status
- Least Concern (IUCN 3.1)

Scientific classification
- Kingdom: Animalia
- Phylum: Chordata
- Class: Actinopterygii
- Order: Siluriformes
- Family: Doradidae
- Genus: Anduzedoras; Fernández-Yépez, 1968
- Species: A. oxyrhynchus

Binomial name
- Anduzedoras oxyrhynchus (Valenciennes in Humboldt and Valenciennes, 1821)

Synonyms
- Doras oxyrhynchus Valenciennes, 1821; Doras ophthalmus Kner, 1853; Doras lipophthalmus Kner, 1855; Opsodoras steindachneri C. H. Eigenmann, 1925; Anduzedoras arleoi Fernández-Yépez, 1968

Species of fish

Anduzedoras oxyrhynchus is the only species in the genus Anduzedoras of the catfish (order Siluriformes) family Doradidae. This species originates from the Rio Negro and upper Orinoco River basins of Brazil and Venezuela and reaches a length of 32.3 centimetres (12.7 in) SL.
