= Orinocodoras eigenmanni =

Conservation status
- Least Concern (IUCN 3.1)

Scientific classification
- Kingdom: Animalia
- Phylum: Chordata
- Class: Actinopterygii
- Order: Siluriformes
- Family: Doradidae
- Genus: Orinocodoras; G. S. Myers, 1927
- Species: O. eigenmanni

Binomial name
- Orinocodoras eigenmanni G. S. Myers, 1927

Species of fish

Orinocodoras eigenmanni is the only species in the genus Orinocodoras of the catfish (order Siluriformes) family Doradidae. This species is endemic to Venezuela where it is found in the Orinoco River basin and reaches a length of 20.0 centimetres (7.9 in) SL.
