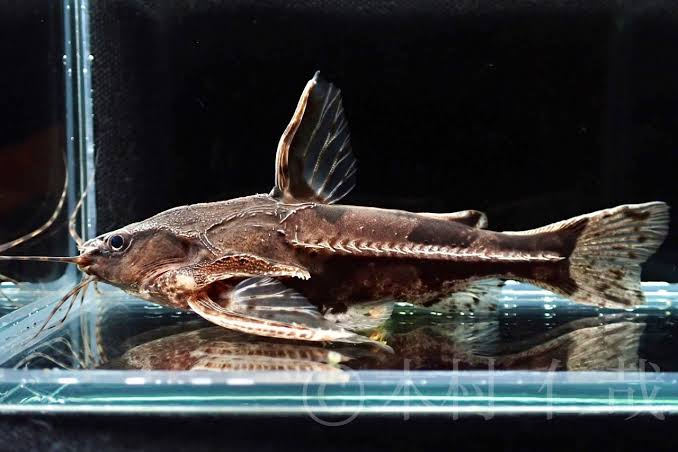
- Amblydoras monitor

Scientific classification
- Kingdom: Animalia
- Phylum: Chordata
- Class: Actinopterygii
- Division: Teleostei
- Order: Siluriformes
- Superfamily: Doradoidea
- Family: Doradidae; Bleeker, 1858

Genera
- Acanthodoras; Agamyxis; Amblydoras; Anadoras; Anduzedoras; Astrodoras; Centrochir; Centrodoras; Doraops; Doras; Franciscodoras; Hassar; Hemidoras; Hypodoras; Kalyptodoras; Leptodoras; Lithodoras; Megalodoras; Nemadoras; Orinocodoras; Ossancora; Oxydoras; Physopyxis; Platydoras; Pterodoras; Rhinodoras; Rhynchodoras; Scorpiodoras; Tenellus; Trachydoras; Wertheimeria

= Doradidae =

Family of fishes

The Doradidae are a family of catfishes also known as thorny catfishes, raphael catfishes or talking catfishes. These fish are native to South America, occurring in most river basins, though they are absent from the Pacific Coast drainages and from coastal drainages south of the Río de la Plata. About 70% of the valid species occur in the Amazon basin; the Orinoco basin harbors about 22 species and ranks second in species richness. Conversely, only two species of doradids have been described from Brazilian eastern coastal basins: Wertheimeria maculata from the Jequitinhonha and Pardo rivers and Kalyptodoras bahiensis from the Paraguaçu River.

Doradids are omnivores.

== Description ==
Doradids are easily recognized by a well-developed nuchal shield (on the "nape") in front of the dorsal fin, as well as well-developed bony lumps along the lateral line that form thorny scutes, though are mainly recognized through specifics of their skeletal and swim bladder anatomy. Doradids typically have three pairs of barbels (no nasal barbels), an adipose fin, and four to six rays on the dorsal fin with a spine on the anterior (first) ray. Additionally, a clade within the family developed fimbriae on their maxillary barbels, which appear as branches along the length of the appendage. In species of Ossancora, the fimbriae occur on both the dorsal and ventral surfaces (top and bottom) of the maxillary barbels.

Thorny catfish typically have prominent serrations on their leading fin-spines of their dorsal and/or pectoral fins. Some species lack such serrations: Anadoras and some Amblydoras lack serrations on the leading (anterior) edge of their dorsal fins, while Leptodoras juruensis, some Platydoras, and all species outside of Doradinae lack serrations on the trailing (posterior) edge. In all thorny catfish, the pectoral fin-spines have serrations on both the anterior and posterior edge. These fish are sometimes called "talking catfish" because of their ability to produce sound: they do so by moving their pectoral spine or vibrating their swim bladder using specialized sonic muscles.

Sizes range from 3.5 cm (1.4 in) SL in Physopyxis lyra to 120 cm (47 in) FL and 20 kg (44 lb) in Oxydoras niger.

== Taxonomy ==
As of 2025, 31 genera and 106 species are in this family. Wertheimeria is considered to be the sister taxon to all other doradids. This family is monophyletic and contains the subfamilies Doradinae, Astrodoradinae and Wertheimerinae.

The following cladogram is based on a 2014 study of catfish morphology:

- Doradidae
  - Wertheimerinae
    - Wertheimeria
    - Kalyptodoras
  - - Franciscodoras
    - - - Anadoras
        - - Scorpiodoras
          - - Astrodoras
            - - Acanthodoras
              - Agamyxis
      - Doradinae
        - - Centrochir
          - Platydoras
        - - - Centrodoras brachiatus
            - - Centrodoras hasemani
              - - Megalodoras
                - - Doraops
                  - - Lithodoras
                    - Pterodoras
          - - - Rhynchodoras
              - - Orinocodoras
                - Rhinodoras
            - - Oxydoras
              - Fimbriate-barbel doradids
                - Ossancora
                - - Trachydoras
                  - - Doras
                    - - Hemidoras
                      - - Nemadoras
                        - - Tenellus
                          - - Hassar
                            - - Anduzedoras
                              - Leptodoras

== See also ==
- List of fish families
