= Pareiorhaphis hypselurus =

Conservation status
- Least Concern (IUCN 3.1)

Scientific classification
- Kingdom: Animalia
- Phylum: Chordata
- Class: Actinopterygii
- Order: Siluriformes
- Family: Loricariidae
- Genus: Pareiorhaphis
- Species: P. hypselurus

Binomial name
- Pareiorhaphis hypselurus (E. H. L. Pereira & Reis, 2002)

Synonyms
- Hemipsilichthys hypselurus E. H. L. Pereira & Reis, 2002

Species of catfish

Pareiorhaphis hypselurus is a species of freshwater ray-finned fish belonging to the family Loricariidae, the suckermouth armoured catfishes, and the subfamily Hypoptopomatinae, the cascudinhos. This catfish is endemic to Brazil.

== Taxonomy ==
Pareiorhaphis hypselurus was first formally described as Hemipsilichthys hypselurus in 2002 by the Brazilian ichthyologists Edson H. L. Pereira and Roberto Esser dos Reis with its type locality given as the Forqueta River, a tributary of the Maquiné River, at 29°32'42"S, 50°14'21"W, Maquiné in the Brazilian state of Rio Grande do Sul. After this species was described it was found that Hemipsilichthys sensu stricto, with three species, were basal loricarids, and the other species were nested within the loricarid diversity and the genus Pareiorhaphis was resurrected from its synonymy with Hemipsilichthys for all but those three species. Eschmeyer's Catalog of Fishes classifies the genus Pareiorhaphus in the subfamily Hypoptopomatinae, the cascudinhos, within the suckermouth armored catfish family Loricariidae.

== Etymology ==
Pareiorhaphis hypselurus is a species in the genus Pareiorhaphis, the name of which is a combination pareio, derived from pareiá, which means "cheek" in Greek, and rhaphis, meaning "needle". This is a reference to the needle like hypertrophied odontodes on the cheeks of the males when they are in breeding condition. The specific name, hypselurus, means "high tail", an allusion to the tall caudal peduncle of this species.

== Description ==
Pareiorhaphis hypselurus has 7 soft rays in its dorsal fin and 5 soft rays in its anal fin. The anal fin has 4 branched raysand the dorsal surface of body and head are dark brown in colour with no black dots. The caudal peduncle is deep, having a depth which is the equivalent of 11.1% to 14.0% the standard length in adults. There are between 74 and 98 teeth on each dentary. This species has an elongated body and reaches a standard length of 6.9 cm (2.7 in).

== Distribution ==
Pareiorhaphis hypselurus is endmeicto Brazil where it is found in the basins of the Maquiné, Três Forquillas, Mampituba and Araranguá rivers, in the coastal regions of Rio Grande do Sul and in the southern Santa Catarina. Thios species is found in shallow, small to medium-sized streams with moderate to strong currents among rocks.
