= Pareiorhaphis hystrix =

Conservation status
- Least Concern (IUCN 3.1)

Scientific classification
- Kingdom: Animalia
- Phylum: Chordata
- Class: Actinopterygii
- Order: Siluriformes
- Family: Loricariidae
- Genus: Pareiorhaphis
- Species: P. hystrix

Binomial name
- Pareiorhaphis hystrix (E. H. L. Pereira & Reis, 2002)

Synonyms
- Hemipsilichthys hystrix E. H. L. Pereira & Reis, 2002

Species of catfish

Pareiorhaphis hystrix is a species of freshwater ray-finned fish belonging to the family Loricariidae, the suckermouth armoured catfishes, and the subfamily Hypoptopomatinae, the cascudinhos. This catfish is endemic to Brazil.

== Taxonomy ==
Pareiorhaphis hystrix was first formally described as Hemipsilichthys hystrix in 2002 by the Brazilian ichthyologists Edson H. L. Pereira and Roberto Esser dos Reis with its type locality given as a creek which is a tributary of the Dos Touros River on the on road from Silveira to Rondinha at 28°39'18"S, 50°18'25"W, Bom Jesus, Rio Grande do Sul. After this species was described it was found that Hemipsilichthys sensu stricto, with three species, were basal loricarids, and the other species were nested within the loricarid diversity and the genus Pareiorhaphis was resurrected from its synonymy with Hemipsilichthys for all but those three species. Eschmeyer's Catalog of Fishes classifies the genus Pareiorhaphus in the subfamily Hypoptopomatinae, the cascudinhos, within the suckermouth armored catfish family Loricariidae.

== Etymology ==
Pareiorhaphis hystrix is a species in the genus Pareiorhaphis, the name of which is a combination pareio, derived from pareiá, which means "cheek" in Greek, and rhaphis, meaning "needle". This is a reference to the needle like hypertrophied odontodes on the cheeks of the males when they are in breeding condition. The specific name, hystrix, means "porcupine", an allusion to the hypertrophied odontodes on the snouts of the males of this species.

== Description ==
Pareiorhaphis hystrix has 7 soft rays in its dorsal fin and 6 in its anal fin. There may be up to 2 unpaired plates in front of the adipose fin. The cleithrum has a wdith which is equivalent to between 29>3% and 31.7% of the standard length. The upper surface of the spine in the pectoral fin has a flap of skin on it in mature males. There are enlarged odontodes on the snouts of mature males, although these are rather delicate and are typically more developed on the front of the snout and the margins of the head. This catfish has an elongated body and reaches a standard lengthof 11.5 cm (4.5 in).

== Distribution ==
Pareiorhaphis hystrix is found in the headwaters of the Pelotas, Ijuí and Taquari rivers in the southeastern Brazilian states of Santa Catarina and Rio Grande do Sul.
