= Pareiorhaphis steindachneri =

Conservation status
- Least Concern (IUCN 3.1)

Scientific classification
- Kingdom: Animalia
- Phylum: Chordata
- Class: Actinopterygii
- Order: Siluriformes
- Family: Loricariidae
- Genus: Pareiorhaphis
- Species: P. steindachneri

Binomial name
- Pareiorhaphis steindachneri (A. Miranda-Ribeiro, 1918)

Synonyms
- Hemipsilichthys steindachneri A. Miranda Ribeiro, 1918; Pseudancistrus luderwaldti A. Miranda Ribeiro 1918

Species of catfish

Pareiorhaphis steindachneri is a species of freshwater ray-finned fish belonging to the family Loricariidae, the suckermouth armoured catfishes, and the subfamily Hypoptopomatinae, the cascudinhos. This catfish is endemic to Brazil.

== Taxonomy ==
Pareiorhaphis steindachneri was first formally described as Hemipsilichthys steindachneri in 1918 by the Brazilian zoologist Alípio de Miranda-Ribeiro with its type locality given as the Itapocu River in Santa Catarina. After this species was described it was found that Hemipsilichthys sensu stricto, with three species, were basal loricarids, and the other species were nested within the loricarid diversity and the genus Pareiorhaphis was resurrected from its synonymy with Hemipsilichthys for all but those three species. Eschmeyer's Catalog of Fishes classifies the genus Pareiorhaphus in the subfamily Hypoptopomatinae, the cascudinhos, within the suckermouth armored catfish family Loricariidae.

== Etymology ==
Pareiorhaphis steindachneri is a species in the genus Pareiorhaphis, the name of which is a combination pareio, derived from pareiá, which means "cheek" in Greek, and rhaphis, meaning "needle". This is a reference to the needle like hypertrophied odontodes on the cheeks of the males when they are in breeding condition. The specific name honours the Austrian ichthyologist Fran Steindachner who reorted this species in 1910, although he identified is as who reported this species as Hemipsilichthys calmoni.

== Description ==
Pareiorhaphis steindachneri has a single spine and 7 soft rays in its dorsal fin and 6 soft rays in the anal fin. There are 1 or 2 unpaired plates to the front of the adipose fin. The hypertrophied odontodes in the head margins are longer than the mandibular ramus nut they are shorter than the length of the snout in fully mature males. They have an adipose finand the spine in the pectoral fin is curved and short, it does not extrend past half of the pelvic fin when flattened against the body. This catfish has an elongated body and reaches a standard length of 14.3 cm (5.6 in).

== Distribution and habitat ==
Pareiorhaphis hystrix is endemic to Brazil where it is found in the Cubatão, Itapocu, and Itajaí-Açu in Santa Catarina, as well as the Marumbi River, in Paraná. This species requires fast-flowing, well-oxygenated, and cold waters, with a rocky streambed, flowing in areas with natural vegetation cover.
