= Pareiorhaphis vestigipinnis =

Conservation status
- Data Deficient (IUCN 3.1)

Scientific classification
- Kingdom: Animalia
- Phylum: Chordata
- Class: Actinopterygii
- Order: Siluriformes
- Family: Loricariidae
- Genus: Pareiorhaphis
- Species: P. vestigipinnis

Binomial name
- Pareiorhaphis vestigipinnis (E. H. L. Pereira & Reis, 2002)

Synonyms
- Hemipsilichthys vestigipinnis E. H. L. Pereira & Reis, 2002

Species of catfish

Pareiorhaphis vestigipinnis is a species of freshwater ray-finned fish belonging to the family Loricariidae, the suckermouth armoured catfishes, and the subfamily Hypoptopomatinae, the cascudinhos. This catfish is endemic to Brazil.

== Taxonomy ==
Pareiorhaphis vestigipinnis was first formally described as Hemipsilichthys vestigipinnis in 2002 by the Brazilian ichthyologists Edson H. L. Pereira and Roberto Esser dos Reis with its type locality given as a creek tributary of the Caveiras River at Painel, at around 27°55'S, 50°05'W, Lages in the Brazilian state of Santa Catarina. After this species was described it was found that Hemipsilichthys sensu stricto, with three species, were basal loricarids, and the other species were nested within the loricarid diversity and the genus Pareiorhaphis was resurrected from its synonymy with Hemipsilichthys for all but those three species. Eschmeyer's Catalog of Fishes classifies the genus Pareiorhaphus in the subfamily Hypoptopomatinae, the cascudinhos, within the suckermouth armored catfish family Loricariidae.

== Etymology ==
Pareiorhaphis vestigipinnis is a species in the genus Pareiorhaphis, the name of which is a combination pareio, derived from pareiá, which means "cheek" in Greek, and rhaphis, meaning "needle". This is a reference to the needle like hypertrophied odontodes on the cheeks of the males when they are in breeding condition. The specific name, vestigipinnis, combines the Latib vestigium, which means "vestige", with pinna, meaning fin, and allausion to the small, or vestigial, plates ate the position of the adipose fin.

== Description ==
Pareiorhaphis vestigipinnis has a single spine and 7 soft rays in its dorsal fin and 6 soft rays in its anal fin. This species can be identified by the absence of the adipose fin, havinga cleithrum with a width equivalent to between 27.3% and 37.7% of the standard length, the dermal plates on the back are normally developed. In breeding males there are a small number hypertrophied odontodes on the sides of the head, these are rather delicate and are typically concealed by large, soft, fleshy lobes. Thsi species has an elongate body shape and it reaches a standard length of 9.8 cm (3.9 in).

== Distribution ==
Pareiorhaphis vestigipinnis is endemic to Brazil, where it occurs in the headwaters of the Canoas River in the Uruguay River basin in Santa Catarina.

== Conservation status ==
Pareiorhaphis vestigipinnis is currently known from only two localities, and there is very little data about the distribution, ecology or threats to enable the International Union for Conservation of Nature to assess the risk of extinction for this species, it is, therefore, classified as Data Deficient.
