= Pareiorhaphis splendens =

Conservation status
- Least Concern (IUCN 3.1)

Scientific classification
- Kingdom: Animalia
- Phylum: Chordata
- Class: Actinopterygii
- Division: Teleostei
- Order: Siluriformes
- Family: Loricariidae
- Genus: Pareiorhaphis
- Species: P. splendens

Binomial name
- Pareiorhaphis splendens (Bizerril, 1995)

Synonyms
- Hemipsilichthys splendens Bizerril, 1995

Species of catfish

Pareiorhaphis splendens is a species of freshwater ray-finned fish belonging to the family Loricariidae, the suckermouth armoured catfishes, and the subfamily Hypoptopomatinae, the cascudinhos. This catfish is endemic to Brazil.

== Taxonomy ==
Pareiorhaphis splendens was first formally described as Hemipsilichthys splendens in 2002 by the Brazilian ichthyologist Carlos Roberto S. F. Bizerril with its type locality given as the Cubatão River, near Joinville in the Brazilian state of Santa Catarina. After this species was described it was found that Hemipsilichthys sensu stricto, with three species, were basal loricarids, and the other species were nested within the loricarid diversity and the genus Pareiorhaphis was resurrected from its synonymy with Hemipsilichthys for all but those three species. Eschmeyer's Catalog of Fishes classifies the genus Pareiorhaphus in the subfamily Hypoptopomatinae, the cascudinhos, within the suckermouth armored catfish family Loricariidae.

== Etymology ==
Pareiorhaphis splendens is a species in the genus Pareiorhaphis, the name of which is a combination pareio, derived from pareiá, which means "cheek" in Greek, and rhaphis, meaning "needle". This is a reference to the needle like hypertrophied odontodes on the cheeks of the males when they are in breeding condition. The specific name, splendens, means "splendid" or "brilliant", an allusion to the colourful pattern of orange spots in living examples.

== Description ==
Pareiorhaphis splendens has a single spine and 7 soft rays in its dorsal fin and 6 soft rays in the anal fin. The spine in the pelvic fin has a length euivalent to between 33.7% and 52.4% of the standard length while the width of the cleithrum is equivalent to 52.7% of the standard length. This catfish has an elongated body and reaches a standard length of 6.5 cm (2.6 in).

== Distribution and habitat ==
Pareiorhaphis splendens is endemic to Brazil where it is found in the Cubatão, Itajaí-Açu, Nhundiaquara and São João Rivers in the states of Paraná and Santa Catarina. This catfish requires fast-flowing, well-oxygenated, and cold waters, where there is a rocky substrate and intact natural vegetation cover.
