= Pareiorhaphis eurycephalus =

Conservation status
- Least Concern (IUCN 3.1)

Scientific classification
- Kingdom: Animalia
- Phylum: Chordata
- Class: Actinopterygii
- Order: Siluriformes
- Family: Loricariidae
- Genus: Pareiorhaphis
- Species: P. eurycephalus

Binomial name
- Pareiorhaphis eurycephalus (E. H. L. Pereira & Reis, 2002)

Synonyms
- Hemipsilichthys eurycephalus E. H. L. Pereira & Reis, 2002

Species of catfish

Pareiorhaphis eurycephalus is a species of freshwater ray-finned fish belonging to the family Loricariidae, the suckermouth armoured catfishes, and the subfamily Hypoptopomatinae, the cascudinhos. This catfish is endemic to Brazil.

== Taxonomy ==
Pareiorhaphis eurycephalus was first formally described as Hemipsilichthys eurycephalus in 2002 by the Brazilian ichthyologists Edson H. L. Pereira and Roberto Esser dos Reis with its type locality given as a creek which is a tributary of the Canoas River, east of vila São José, on road to serra do Corvo Branco at 28°03'33"S, 49°25'42"W, Urubici in the Brazilian state of Santa Catarina. After this species was described it was found that Hemipsilichthys sensu stricto, with three species, were basal loricarids, and the other species were nested within the loricarid diversity and the genus Pareiorhaphis was resurrected from its synonymy with Hemipsilichthys for all but those three species. Eschmeyer's Catalog of Fishes classifies the genus Pareiorhaphus in the subfamily Hypoptopomatinae, the cascudinhos, within the suckermouth armored catfish family Loricariidae.

== Etymology ==
Pareiorhaphis eurycephalus is a species in the genus Pareiorhaphis, the name of which is a combination pareio, derived from pareiá, which means "cheek" in Greek, and rhaphis, meaning "needle". This is a reference to the needle like hypertrophied odontodes on the cheeks of the males when they are in breeding condition. The specific name, eurycephalus, means "wide head", an allusion to the moderately flattened and wide head of this species.

== Description ==
Pareiorhaphis eurycephalus has 7 soft rays in its dorsal fin and 5 or 6 soft rays in its anal fin. Its adipose fin is reduced in size and may be absent. The cleithrum has a width that is equivalent to 33.5 to 40% of the standard length. This species has an elongated body and reaches a standard length of 6.3 cm (2.5 in).

== Distribution ==
Pareiorhaphis eurycephalus is found in the upper basin of the Canoas River in Santa Catarina, Brazil.
