= Pareiorhaphis azygolechis =

Conservation status
- Least Concern (IUCN 3.1)

Scientific classification
- Kingdom: Animalia
- Phylum: Chordata
- Class: Actinopterygii
- Order: Siluriformes
- Family: Loricariidae
- Genus: Pareiorhaphis
- Species: P. azygolechis

Binomial name
- Pareiorhaphis azygolechis (E. H. L. Pereira & Reis, 2002)

Synonyms
- Hemipsilichthys azygolechis E. H. L. Pereira & Reis, 2002

Species of catfish

Pareiorhaphis azygolechis is a species of freshwater ray-finned fish belonging to the family Loricariidae, the suckermouth armoured catfishes, and the subfamily Hypoptopomatinae, the cascudinhos. This catfish is endemic to Brazil.

== Taxonomy ==
Pareiorhaphis azygolechis was first formally described as Hemipsilichthys azygolechis in 2002 by the Brazilian ichthyologists Edson H. L. Pereira and Roberto Esser dos Reis with its type locality given as the Araraquara River approximately 8 km (5.0 mi) north of Garuva, at 25°57'58"S, 48°49'43"W, in Guaratuba, Paraná. After this species was described it was found that Hemipsilichthys sensu stricto, with three species, were basal loricarids, and the other species were nested within the loricarid diversity and the genus Pareiorhaphis was resurrected from its synonymy with Hemipsilichthys for all but those three species. Eschmeyer's Catalog of Fishes classifies the genus Pareiorhaphus in the subfamily Hypoptopomatinae, the cascudinhos, within the suckermouth armored catfish family Loricariidae.

== Etymology ==
Pareiorhaphis azygolechis is a species in the genus Pareiorhaphis, the name of which is a combination pareio, derived from pareiá, which means "cheek" in Greek, and rhaphis, meaning "needle". This is a reference to the needle like hypertrophied odontodes on the cheeks of the males when they are in breeding condition. The specific name is a compound of ázygos, meaning "single" or "unpaired", with lechis, which is derived from lekís or lékos, which means "dish", "pot" or "pan" (Pereira and Reis said "plate"), an allusion to the 3–6 unpaired plates in front of the adipose fin of this species.

== Description ==
Pareiorhaphis azygolechis has 7 soft rays in its dorsal fin and 6 soft rays in its anal fin. The rictal barbel is joined to the lower lip in a complicated and elaborate fringe> the pectoral fin contains a thin spine, which is thinner than that of the pelvic fin. The lateral process of the cleithrum is largely above the origin of the pectoral fin. The mature males have short hypertrophied odontodes along the edges of the head which are head concealed under large fleshy lobes. This species has an elongate body and reaches a standard length of 11.7 cm (4.6 in).

== Distribution and habitat ==
Pareiorhaphis azygolechis is found in the São João River basin, in the states of Santa Catarina and Paraná, as well as in the Cubatão River basin, Paraná. Records from other rivers have yet to be confirmed. It is a benthopelagic fish which requires well oxygentated, cold streams, with fast currents and rocky beds and shaded by vegetation.

== Conservation status ==
Pareiorhaphis azygolechis is a relatively uncommon species, needing unmodified habitats where there are fast-flowing, well-oxygenated, and cold streams with rocky substrates, and natural vegetation cover. It is found in a number of protected areas, including conservation units and no significant threats to the species have been identified. The International Union for Conservation of Nature therefore classify this catfish as Least Concern.
