= Pareiorhaphis stomias =

Conservation status
- Least Concern (IUCN 3.1)

Scientific classification
- Kingdom: Animalia
- Phylum: Chordata
- Class: Actinopterygii
- Order: Siluriformes
- Family: Loricariidae
- Genus: Pareiorhaphis
- Species: P. stomias

Binomial name
- Pareiorhaphis stomias (E. H. L. Pereira & Reis, 2002)

Synonyms
- Hemipsilichthys stomias E. H. L. Pereira & Reis, 1999

Species of catfish

Pareiorhaphis stomias is a species of freshwater ray-finned fish belonging to the family Loricariidae, the suckermouth armoured catfishes, and the subfamily Hypoptopomatinae, the cascudinhos. This catfish is endemic to Brazil.

== Taxonomy ==
Pareiorhaphis stomias was first formally described in 1999 as Hemipsilichthys stomias by the Brazilian ichthyologists Edson Henrique Lopes Pereira and Roberto Esser dos Reis with its type locality given as the Mãe Luzia River at Forquilha, 28°27'66"S, 49°30'06"W, in the Araranguá River basin, Treviso, Santa Catarina. After this species was described it was found that Hemipsilichthys sensu stricto, with three species, were basal loricarids, and the other species were nested within the loricarid diversity and the genus Pareiorhaphis was resurrected from its synonymy with Hemipsilichthys for all but those three species. Eschmeyer's Catalog of Fishes classifies the genus Pareiorhaphus in the subfamily Hypoptopomatinae, the cascudinhos, within the suckermouth armored catfish family Loricariidae.

== Etymology ==
Pareiorhaphis stomias is a species in the genus Pareiorhaphis, the name of which is a combination pareio, derived from pareiá, which means "cheek" in Greek, and rhaphis, meaning "needle". This is a reference to the needle like hypertrophied odontodes on the cheeks of the males when they are in breeding condition. The specific name, stomias, means "hard mouthed horse" in Greek but can also be used to refer to any animal with a large mouth, presumed to refer to the broad mouth of this catfish, the width of the mouth being almost equal to that of the head.

== Description ==
Pareiorhaphis stomias has 7 soft rays in its dorsal fin and 5 in its anal fin. The anal fin has 4 branched rays and the upper surface of body and head covered by clear black spots The body is elongate in shape and this catfish reaches a standard length of 5.2 cm (2.0 in).

== Distribution and habitat ==
Pareiorhaphis stomias is endemic to Brazil where it ioccurs in the Araranguá and Tubarão river basins, in the southern coastal region of the state of Santa Catarina. This catfish requires fast-flowing, well-oxygenated, and cold waters, where there is a rocky substrate and flowing in areas with natural vegetation cover.
