= Pareiorhaphis nasuta =

Conservation status
- Near Threatened (IUCN 3.1)

Scientific classification
- Kingdom: Animalia
- Phylum: Chordata
- Class: Actinopterygii
- Order: Siluriformes
- Family: Loricariidae
- Genus: Pareiorhaphis
- Species: P. nasuta

Binomial name
- Pareiorhaphis nasuta E. H. L. Pereira, F. Vieira & Reis, 2007

Species of catfish

Pareiorhaphis nasuta is a species of freshwater ray-finned fish belonging to the family Loricariidae, the suckermouth armoured catfishes, and the subfamily Hypoptopomatinae, the cascudinhos. This catfish is endemic to Brazil.

== Taxonomy ==
Pareiorhaphis nasuta was first formally described in 2007 by the Brazilian ichthyologists Edson H. L. Pereira, Fábio Vieira and Roberto Esser dos Reis with its type locality given as the Ribeirão Areia Branca, a tributary to hydroelectric dam Túlio Cordeiro de Mello, in the Matipó drainage basin part of the Doce River drainage, at 20°11'17"S, 42°22'27"W, District of Granada, Abre Campo, in the Brazilian state of Minas Gerais. Eschmeyer's Catalog of Fishes classifies the genus Pareiorhaphus in the subfamily Hypoptopomatinae, the cascudinhos, within the suckermouth armored catfish family Loricariidae.

== Etymology ==
Pareiorhaphis nasuta a species in the genus Pareiorhaphis, the name of which is a combination pareio, derived from pareiá, which means "cheek" in Greek, and rhaphis, meaning "needle". This is a reference to the needle like hypertrophied odontodes on the cheeks of the males when they are in breeding condition. The specific name, nasuta, means "long nosed", an allusion to the diagnostic long snout of this species.

== Description ==
Pareiorhaphis nasuta has a single spine and 7 soft rays in its dorsal fin and 6 soft rays in its anal fin. It can be told apart from other species in its genus by its markedly longer snout. This species has an elongated body and it reaches a standard length of 9.5 cm (3.7 in).

== Distribution and habitat ==
Pareiorhaphis nasuta is endemic to Brazil where it is restricted to the Doce River basin in Minas Gerais. This catfish is found in stretches of rapids, among boulders and pebbles. Larger individuals and adult males were found among the boulders and in stretches with a fast current.

== Conservation status ==
Pareiorhaphis nasuta is only known from the Doce River basin in Minas Gerais and it is threatened by the construction of hydroelectric dams and deforestation, leading to the silting up of the streams it lives in. The International Union for Conservation of Nature classify this species as Near Threatened.
