= Pareiorhaphis garapia =

Scientific classification
- Kingdom: Animalia
- Phylum: Chordata
- Class: Actinopterygii
- Order: Siluriformes
- Family: Loricariidae
- Genus: Pareiorhaphis
- Species: P. garapia

Binomial name
- Pareiorhaphis garapia E. H. L. Pereira, Lehmann A., Schvambach & Reis, 2015

Species of catfish

Pareiorhaphis garapia is a species of freshwater ray-finned fish belonging to the family Loricariidae, the suckermouth armoured catfishes, and the subfamily Hypoptopomatinae, the cascudinhos. This catfish is endemic to Brazil.

== Taxonomy ==
Pareiorhaphis garapia was first formally described in 2015 by Edson H. L. Pereira, Pablo César Lehmann A., Lucas J. Schvambach and Roberto Esser dos Reis with its type locality given as the Arroio Garapiá, upstream of the Garapiá Waterfall, Maquiné, Barro do Ouro, in the state of Rio Grande do Sul. Eschmeyer's Catalog of Fishes classifies the genus Pareiorhaphus in the subfamily Hypoptopomatinae, the cascudinhos, within the suckermouth armored catfish family Loricariidae.

== Etymology ==
Pareiorhaphis garapia is a species in the genus Pareiorhaphis, the name of which is a combination pareio, derived from pareiá, which means "cheek" in Greek, and rhaphis, meaning "needle". This is a reference to the needle like hypertrophied odontodes on the cheeks of the males when they are in breeding condition. The specific name, garapia, refers to the type locality, the Arroio Garapiá, as well as the waterfall which limits the distribution of this catfish.

== Description ==
Pareiorhaphis garapia has 7 or 8 soft rays on its dorsal fin and 5 or 6 soft rays in its anal fin, The plate on the nape, the nuchal plate, is covered by thick skin and is not exposed. Thios species has an elongated body and reaches a standard length of 6 cm (2.4 in).

== Distribution and habitat ==
Pareiorhaphis garapia is known only from the Arroio Garapiá in the Tramandaí drainage in Rio Grande do Sul, Brazil. It habitat starts at an altitude of 409 m (1,340 ft); the stream is half a metre deep with very clear water, a fast current and a rocky streambed with pebbles. The stream is within an area of ombrophilous forest.
