= Pareiorhaphis stephana =

Conservation status
- Near Threatened (IUCN 3.1)

Scientific classification
- Kingdom: Animalia
- Phylum: Chordata
- Class: Actinopterygii
- Division: Teleostei
- Order: Siluriformes
- Family: Loricariidae
- Genus: Pareiorhaphis
- Species: P. stephana

Binomial name
- Pareiorhaphis stephana (J. C. Oliveira & Oyakawa, 1999)

Synonyms
- Hemipsilichthys stephanus J. C. Oliveira & Oyakawa, 1999

Species of catfish

Pareiorhaphis stephana is a species of freshwater ray-finned fish belonging to the family Loricariidae, the suckermouth armoured catfishes, and the subfamily Hypoptopomatinae, the cascudinhos. This catfish is endemic to Brazil.

== Taxonomy ==
Pareiorhaphis stephana was first formally described in 1999 as Hemipsilichthys stephanus by the Brazilian ichthyologists J. C. Oliveira and Osvaldo Takeshi Oyakawa with its type locality given as the ribeirão das Pedras, at an elevation of roughly 1,300 m (4,300 ft), 3 km (1.9 mi) north of Diamantina, at about 18°10'S, 43°37'W, in Diamantina Municipality, in the Jequitinhonha River drainage of Minas Gerais. After this species was described it was found that Hemipsilichthys sensu stricto, with three species, were basal loricarids, and the other species were nested within the loricarid diversity and the genus Pareiorhaphis was resurrected from its synonymy with Hemipsilichthys for all but those three species. Eschmeyer's Catalog of Fishes classifies the genus Pareiorhaphus in the subfamily Hypoptopomatinae, the cascudinhos, within the suckermouth armored catfish family Loricariidae.

== Etymology ==
Pareiorhaphis stephana is a species in the genus Pareiorhaphis, the name of which is a combination pareio, derived from pareiá, which means "cheek" in Greek, and rhaphis, meaning "needle". This is a reference to the needle like hypertrophied odontodes on the cheeks of the males when they are in breeding condition. The specific name, stephana, is an adjective derived from the Neo-Latin stéphanos, meaning "crown", an allusion to the crown of bristle-like odontodes on the margin of the head. As the specific name is an adjective it changed from stephanus to stephana when this species was moved into Pareiorhaphis.

== Description ==
Pareiorhaphis stephana has 7 soft rays in its dorsal fin and 6 in its anal fin. There is a crown of long bristle like odontodes on the fron and sides of the snout. The cleithrum is obvious and it has a flattened body which has a depth equivalent to twice the width of the pectoral girdle. The body is elongate in shape and this catfish reaches a standard length of 9.9 cm (3.9 in).

== Distribution and habitat ==
Pareiorhaphis stephana is endemic to Brazil where it is found in the basin of the Jequitinhonha River in Minas Gerais. This catfish requires fast-flowing, well-oxygenated, and cold waters, where there is a rocky substrate and high volume water flow.

== Conservation status ==
Pareiorhaphis stephana is known only from three locations, although it is thought likely to be found at other locations in the Jequitinhonha drainage with suitable habitat. It is threatened by hydroelectric damming and mining and the International Union for Conservation of Nature have classified it as Near Threatened.
