= Pareiorhaphis mutuca =

Conservation status
- Endangered (IUCN 3.1)

Scientific classification
- Kingdom: Animalia
- Phylum: Chordata
- Class: Actinopterygii
- Order: Siluriformes
- Family: Loricariidae
- Genus: Pareiorhaphis
- Species: P. mutuca

Binomial name
- Pareiorhaphis mutuca (J. C. Oliveira & Oyakawa, 1999)

Synonyms
- Hemipsilichthys mutuca J. C. Oliveira & Oyakawa, 1999

Species of catfish

Pareiorhaphis mutuca is a species of freshwater ray-finned fish belonging to the family Loricariidae, the suckermouth armoured catfishes, and the subfamily Hypoptopomatinae, the cascudinhos. This catfish is endemic to Brazil.

== Taxonomy ==
Pareiorhaphis mutuca was first formally described in 1999 as Hemipsilichthys mutuca by the Brazilian ichthyologists Jose Carlos de Oliveira and Osvaldo Takeshi Oyakawa with its type locality given as Das Velhas River drainage, Nova Lima County, Mutuca Stream, at right side of road from Belo Horizonte to Nova Lima at kilometre 20, about 20°60'S, 43°55'W. After this species was described it was found that Hemipsilichthys sensu stricto, with three species, were basal loricarids, and the other species were nested within the loricarid diversity and the genus Pareiorhaphis was resurrected from its synonymy with Hemipsilichthys for all but those three species. Eschmeyer's Catalog of Fishes classifies the genus Pareiorhaphus in the subfamily Hypoptopomatinae, the cascudinhos, within the suckermouth armored catfish family Loricariidae.

== Etymology ==
Pareiorhaphis mutuca is a species in the genus Pareiorhaphis, the name of which is a combination pareio, derived from pareiá, which means "cheek" in Greek, and rhaphis, meaning "needle". This is a reference to the needle like hypertrophied odontodes on the cheeks of the males when they are in breeding condition. The specific name, mutuca, refers to the type locality of this species, the Mutuca stream.

== Description ==
Pareiorhaphis mutuca has 7 soft rays in its dorsal fin and 6 in its anal fin. This species can be told from the other species of Pareioraphis by the shape and size of the cleithrum and the pattern of hypertrophied odontodes on the side of the head which are longer to teh rear and point backwards. This catfish has an elongated body and it reaches a standard length of 10.2 cm (4.0 in).

== Distribution and habitat ==
Pareiorhaphis mutuca was formerly known only from its type locality but the population there hase becomne locally extinct. However, new populations were recorded in the municipality of Caeté, in the Prata stream, a tributary of the right bank of the Velhas River, and in the Maquine stream, a tributary of the right bank of the Prata stream, both belonging to the Velhas River basin, both being in the São Francisco drainage system. This catfish is found in rocky and stony reaches of rivers, hding under stones and in crevices during the day but it is active throughout the day.

== Conservation status ==
Pareiorhaphis mutuca is listed as Endangered by the International Union for Conservation of Nature because it has a restricted range in Minas Gerais, it has been extirpated from its type locality and is known from only two other localities where the same pressure from mining as blighted the type locality are also happening.
