= Pareiorhaphis ruschii =

Conservation status
- Least Concern (IUCN 3.1)

Scientific classification
- Kingdom: Animalia
- Phylum: Chordata
- Class: Actinopterygii
- Order: Siluriformes
- Family: Loricariidae
- Genus: Pareiorhaphis
- Species: P. ruschii

Binomial name
- Pareiorhaphis ruschii E. H. L. Pereira, Lehmann A. & Reis, 2012

Species of catfish

Pareiorhaphis ruschii is a species of freshwater ray-finned fish belonging to the family Loricariidae, the suckermouth armoured catfishes, and the subfamily Hypoptopomatinae, the cascudinhos. This catfish is endemic to Brazil.

== Taxonomy ==
Pareiorhaphis ruschii was first formally described in 2012 by the Brazilian ichthyologists Edson H. L. Pereira, Pablo César Lehmann A. and Roberto Esser dos Reis with its type locality given as Córrego Lombardia, around 1 km (0.62 mi) northeast of the Reserva Biológica Augusto Ruschi, a tributary to the Piraqué-Açu River at 19°52'26"S, 40°32'08"W, Santa Teresa Municipality, Espírito Santo. Eschmeyer's Catalog of Fishes classifies the genus Pareiorhaphus in the subfamily Hypoptopomatinae, the cascudinhos, within the suckermouth armored catfish family Loricariidae.

== Etymology ==
Pareiorhaphis ruschii is a species in the genus Pareiorhaphis, the name of which is a combination pareio, derived from pareiá, which means "cheek" in Greek, and rhaphis, meaning "needle". This is a reference to the needle like hypertrophied odontodes on the cheeks of the males when they are in breeding condition. The specific name, ruschii, honours the Brazilian naturalist Augusto Ruschi, in recognition of his study of the humminbirds of the Brazilian Atlantic Forest and his unwavering attempts to create the conservation area, the Augusto Ruschi Biological Reserve, which now protects this species.

== Description ==
Pareiorhaphis ruschii is told apart from all other Pareiorhaphis. except P. azygolechis, by the possession of a dense fringe on the lower lip. Other distinct feateures are that this species has both a row of 6-10 (typically 7-9) small median, unpaired plates, forming a low ridge between the dorsal and the adipose fins and it has a long, straight spine in the pectoral fin. This species has an elongated body and it reaches a standard length of 8.5 cm (3.3 in).

== Distribution ==
Pareiorhaphis ruschii is endemic to Brazil where it is found in the coastal river basins of Espírito Santo, the Piraqué-Açu and Reis Magos Rivers.
