= Pareiorhaphis garbei =

Conservation status
- Near Threatened (IUCN 3.1)

Scientific classification
- Kingdom: Animalia
- Phylum: Chordata
- Class: Actinopterygii
- Order: Siluriformes
- Family: Loricariidae
- Genus: Pareiorhaphis
- Species: P. garbei

Binomial name
- Pareiorhaphis garbei (Ihering, 1911)

Synonyms
- Hemipsilichthys garbei Ihering, 1911

Species of catfish

Pareiorhaphis garbei is a species of freshwater ray-finned fish belonging to the family Loricariidae, the suckermouth armoured catfishes, and the subfamily Hypoptopomatinae, the cascudinhos. This catfish is endemic to Brazil.

== Taxonomy ==
Pareiorhaphis garbei was first formally described as Hemipsilichthys garbei in 1911 by the Brazilian zoologist Rodolpho von Ihering with its type locality given as the Macaé River in Rio de Janeiro State. After this species was described it was found that Hemipsilichthys sensu stricto, with three species, were basal loricarids, and the other species were nested within the loricarid diversity and the genus Pareiorhaphis was resurrected from its synonymy with Hemipsilichthys for all but those three species. Eschmeyer's Catalog of Fishes classifies the genus Pareiorhaphus in the subfamily Hypoptopomatinae, the cascudinhos, within the suckermouth armored catfish family Loricariidae.

== Etymology ==
Pareiorhaphis garbei is a species in the genus Pareiorhaphis, the name of which is a combination pareio, derived from pareiá, which means "cheek" in Greek, and rhaphis, meaning "needle". This is a reference to the needle like hypertrophied odontodes on the cheeks of the males when they are in breeding condition. The specific name honours the Brazilian zoologist Ernesto Garbe who collected specimens, presumably including the holotype of P. garbei, for the Museu Paulista.

== Description ==
Pareiorhaphis garbei has 7 soft rays in its dorsal fin and 6 soft rays in its anal fin. This species has simple teeth with a single cusp on both the dentary and the premaxilla. The barbel on the maxilla is long and does not join the lower lip. There are between 3 and 6 unpaired plates in front of the adipose fin. In the breeding males the pectoral fin spines are thickened and richly decorated with long hypertrophied odontodes, The body of this catfish is elongated and it reaches a total length of 14 cm (5.5 in).

== Distribution and habitat ==
Pareiorhaphis garbei is endemic to Brazil where it occurs in Atlantic coastal basins in the states of Espírito Santo and Rio de Janeiro. It inhabits the headwaters and high-altitude stretches, where there are clear, cold waters and rocky bottoms. In the state of Rio de Janeiro, this catfish is found in the upper reaches of the Macacu and Macaé rivers, these rivers originate in the Serra dos Órgãos. It has also been recorded from Nova Friburgo, in the Santo Antônio stream, a left bank of a tributary of the Bonito River, the right bank of the Macaé River, and the Soberbo River.

== Conservation status ==
Pareiorhamphus garbei is threatened by a continued decline in habitat quality throughout its distribution area, these include damage by agricultural activities, dams resultiung in the silting up of the rocky streambeds, pesticides, urbanisation, forestry, coffee plantations and maybe non-native invasive species. The International Union for Conservation of Nature has classified this species as Near Threatened but noted that it is close to being classified as Vulnerable.
