= Hemipsilichthys nimius =

Conservation status
- Near Threatened (IUCN 3.1)

Scientific classification
- Kingdom: Animalia
- Phylum: Chordata
- Class: Actinopterygii
- Order: Siluriformes
- Family: Loricariidae
- Genus: Hemipsilichthys
- Species: H. nimius

Binomial name
- Hemipsilichthys nimius E. H. L. Pereira, R. E. dos Reis, P. F. M. Souza & Lazzarotto, 2003

Species of fish

Hemipsilichthys nimius is a species of freshwater ray-finned fish belonging to the family Loricariidae, the armoured suckermouth catfishes, and the subfamily Delturinae, the primitive suckermouth catfishes. The species is only known from two small rivers in Rio de Janeiro State, Brazil: the Perequê-Áçu and the Taquari.

This is a fairly typical loricariid with a broad head and large mouth used for adhesion to rocks in fast-flowing water. Colouring is generally pale brown with darker blotches with standard length up to 10.5 centimetres (4.1 in). It can be distinguished from all its congeners by the anatomy of the dorsal fin: eight branched rays are present instead of seven and there is a membrane connecting the last ray to the back of the fish.
