= Delturus brevis =

Conservation status
- Least Concern (IUCN 3.1)

Scientific classification
- Kingdom: Animalia
- Phylum: Chordata
- Class: Actinopterygii
- Order: Siluriformes
- Family: Loricariidae
- Genus: Delturus
- Species: D. brevis

Binomial name
- Delturus brevis Reis & Pereira, 2006

Species of armored catfish

Delturus brevis is a species of freshwater ray-finned fish belonging to the family Loricariidae, the armoured suckermouth catfishes, and the subfamily Delturinae, the primitive suckermouth catfishes. This catfish is endemic to Brazil where it is restricted to the Jequitinhonha River basin in the state of Minas Gerais. This species attains a maximum standard length of 18.6 cm (7.3 in).
