= Armoured catfish =

Armoured catfish may refer to:

- Family Loricariidae: The armoured suckermouth catfish, also known as suckermouth catfish, armoured catfish or simply 'plecs' or 'plecos'
- Family Callichthyidae: armoured catfish, includes the genera
  - Corydoras, sometimes referred to as armoured catfish
  - Callichthys, known as the armoured catfish
  - Hoplosternum, known as the brown hoplo, cascadura or armoured catfish and in Guyana it's called Hassa.
- Callichthys callichthys, a species popular in the aquarium trade, common name 'armoured catfish'
- The thorny catfishes, Doradidae, are also sometimes referred to as armoured catfish
