= Pareiorhaphis scutula =

Conservation status
- Least Concern (IUCN 3.1)

Scientific classification
- Kingdom: Animalia
- Phylum: Chordata
- Class: Actinopterygii
- Order: Siluriformes
- Family: Loricariidae
- Genus: Pareiorhaphis
- Species: P. scutula

Binomial name
- Pareiorhaphis scutula E. H. L. Pereira, Vieira & Reis, 2010

Species of catfish

Pareiorhaphis scutula is a species of freshwater ray-finned fish belonging to the family Loricariidae, the suckermouth armoured catfishes, and the subfamily Hypoptopomatinae, the cascudinhos. This catfish is endemic to Brazil.

== Taxonomy ==
Pareiorhaphis scutula was first formally described in 2012 by the Brazilian ichthyologists Edson H. L. Pereira, Fábio Vieira and Roberto Esser dos Reis with its type locality given as the Córrego Prainha, a tributary of the Piracicaba at 19°38'54"S, 42°57'37"W, Nova Era, in the Doce River drainage, Minas Gerais. Eschmeyer's Catalog of Fishes classifies the genus Pareiorhaphus in the subfamily Hypoptopomatinae, the cascudinhos, within the suckermouth armored catfish family Loricariidae.

== Etymology ==
Pareiorhaphis scutula is a species in the genus Pareiorhaphis, the name of which is a combination pareio, derived from pareiá, which means "cheek" in Greek, and rhaphis, meaning "needle". This is a reference to the needle like hypertrophied odontodes on the cheeks of the males when they are in breeding condition. The specific name, scutula, is Latin and means "small plate", an allusion to the small bony plates on the ventral region of this species.

== Description ==
Pareiorhaphis scutula has its ventral surface wholly covered with small platelets embedded in its skin and also irregularly scattered from the pectoral girdle to the origin of the pelvic fin. This species has an elongated body and it reaches a standard length of 9.1 cm (3.6 in).

== Distribution ==
Pareiorhaphis scutula is endemic to Brazil where it is found in the upper reaches of the Doce River in Minas Gerais.
