= Pareiorhaphis =

Scientific classification
- Kingdom: Animalia
- Phylum: Chordata
- Class: Actinopterygii
- Order: Siluriformes
- Family: Loricariidae
- Subfamily: Hypoptopomatinae
- Genus: Pareiorhaphis; A. Miranda-Ribeiro, 1918

Type species
- Hemipsilichthys cameroni Steindachner, 1907

Synonyms
- Psilichthys Steindachner, 1907

Genus of fishes

Pareiorhaphis is a genus of freshwater ray-finned fishes belonging to the family Loricariidae, the suckermouth armored catfishes, and the subfamily Hypoptopomatinae, the cascudinhos. The catfishes in this genus are found in South America.

== Taxonomy ==
Pareiorhaphis was first proposed as a genus in 1918 by the Brazilian zoologist Alípio de Miranda-Ribeiro without designating a type species. In 1920 Charles Tate Regan designated Hemipsilichthys calmoni as the type species. The genus was first called Psilichthys by Franz Steindachner but this name was preoccuppied by a fossil fish genus Psilichthys. Some authorities classified this species in the genus Hemipsilichthys and treated Pareiorhaphis as junior synonym of Hemipsilichthys but later authorities have found that Hemipsilichthys sensu stricto, with three species, were basal loricarids and the other species were nested within the loricarid diversity and the genus Pareiorhaphis was resurrected from its synonymy with Hemipsilichthys. Whether Pareiorhaphis is monophyletic or not is currently unknown. Eschmeyer's Catalog of Fishes classifies this genus in the subfamily Hypoptopomatinae, the cascudinhos, within the suckermouth armored catfish family Loricariidae. This family is included in the suborder Loricarioidei of the catfish order Siluriformes. Other authorities classify this genus in the subfamily Neoplecostominae.

== Species ==
Pareiorhaphis contains the following valid species:

- Pareiorhaphis azygolechis (E. H. L. Pereira & Reis, 2002)
- Pareiorhaphis bahiana (Gosline, 1947)
- Pareiorhaphis cameroni (Steindachner, 1907)
- Pareiorhaphis cerosa (P. Miranda Ribeiro, 1951)
- Pareiorhaphis eurycephalus (E. H. L. Pereira & Reis, 2002)
- Pareiorhaphis garapia E. H. L. Pereira, Lehmann A., Schvambach & Reis, 2015
- Pareiorhaphis garbei (Ihering, 1911)
- Pareiorhaphis hypselurus (E. H. L. Pereira & Reis, 2002)
- Pareiorhaphis hystrix (E. H. L. Pereira & Reis, 2002)
- Pareiorhaphis lineata E. H. L. Pereira, Pessali, Andrade & Reis, 2017
- Pareiorhaphis lophia E. H. L. Pereira & Zanata, 2014
- Pareiorhaphis mucurina E. H. L. Pereira, Pessali & Reis, 2018
- Pareiorhaphis mutuca (J. C. Oliveira & Oyakawa, 1999)
- Pareiorhaphis nasuta E. H. L. Pereira, Vieira & Reis, 2007
- Pareiorhaphis nudula (Reis & E. H. L. Pereira, 1999)
- Pareiorhaphis parmula E. H. L. Pereira, 2005
- Pareiorhaphis proskynita E. H. L. Pereira & Britto, 2012
- Pareiorhaphis pumila E. H. L. Pereira & Reis, 2022
- Pareiorhaphis regani (Giltay, 1936)
- Pareiorhaphis ruschii E. H. L. Pereira, Lehmann A. & Reis, 2012
- Pareiorhaphis scutula E. H. L. Pereira, Vieira & Reis, 2010
- Pareiorhaphis splendens (Bizerril, 1995)
- Pareiorhaphis steindachneri (A. Miranda-Ribeiro, 1918)
- Pareiorhaphis stephana (J. C. Oliveira & Oyakawa, 1999)
- Pareiorhaphis stomias (E. H. L. Pereira & Reis, 2002)
- Pareiorhaphis togoroi J. C. Oliveira & Oyakawa 2019
- Pareiorhaphis torrenticola E. H. L. Pereira, Pessali & Reis, 2024
- Pareiorhaphis vestigipinnis (E. H. L. Pereira & Reis, 1992)
- Pareiorhaphis vetula E. H. L. Pereira, Lehmann A. & Reis, 2016

== Distribution ==
Pareiorhaphis catfishes are found in South America wheren they are known only from Brazil.

== Etymology ==
Pareiorhaphis combines pareio, derived frompareiá, which means "cheek" in Greek, and rhaphis, meaning "needle". This is a reference to the needle like hypertrophied odontodes on the cheeks of the males when they are in breeding condition.

== Characteristics ==
Pareiorhaphis can be readily distinguished from other neoplecostomines by the unique combination of having fleshy lobes on lateral margins of head ornamented with hypertrophied odontodes on nuptial males, caudal peduncle ovoid in cross section, abdomen usually naked, dorsal fin spinelet ovoid and adipose fin usually present. The color pattern is usually dark brown and mottled with the abdomen white.
