= Pareiorhaphis regani =

Conservation status
- Data Deficient (IUCN 3.1)

Scientific classification
- Kingdom: Animalia
- Phylum: Chordata
- Class: Actinopterygii
- Order: Siluriformes
- Family: Loricariidae
- Genus: Pareiorhaphis
- Species: P. regani

Binomial name
- Pareiorhaphis regani (Giltay, 1936)

Synonyms
- Hemipsilichthys regani Giltay. 1936

Species of catfish

Pareiorhaphis regani is a species of freshwater ray-finned fish belonging to the family Loricariidae, the suckermouth armoured catfishes, and the subfamily Hypoptopomatinae, the cascudinhos. This catfish is endemic to Brazil.

== Taxonomy ==
Pareiorhaphis regani was first formally described in 1936 as Hemipsilichthys regani by the Belgian ichthyologists Louis Giltay with its type locality given as the Rio Curi Curiay, south of upper Rio Negro, Amazonas, Brazil. After this species was described it was found that Hemipsilichthys sensu stricto, with three species, were basal loricarids, and the other species were nested within the loricarid diversity and the genus Pareiorhaphis was resurrected from its synonymy with Hemipsilichthys for all but those three species. Eschmeyer's Catalog of Fishes classifies the genus Pareiorhaphus in the subfamily Hypoptopomatinae, the cascudinhos, within the suckermouth armored catfish family Loricariidae.

== Etymology ==
Pareiorhaphis regani is a species in the genus Pareiorhaphis, the name of which is a combination pareio, derived from pareiá, which means "cheek" in Greek, and rhaphis, meaning "needle". This is a reference to the needle like hypertrophied odontodes on the cheeks of the males when they are in breeding condition. The specific name honours the British ichthyologist Charles Tate Regan of the British Museum (Natural History) who published a monograph on the Loricariidae and who was cited three times by Giltay.

== Description ==
Pareiorhaphis regani can be distinguished from its congeners by the hypertrophied odontodes on the side of the head being longer than the snout. It has an elongated body and reaches a standard length of 12.1 cm (4.8 in).

== Distribution ==
Pareiorhaphis regani is endemic to Brazil where it is known only from its type locality and from the Rio Jaú, further downstream the Rio Negro. Both localities are in Amazonas. These are the only two records of its occurrence, and the second still requires confirmation
