= Callichthys serralabium =

Conservation status
- Least Concern (IUCN 3.1)

Scientific classification
- Kingdom: Animalia
- Phylum: Chordata
- Class: Actinopterygii
- Order: Siluriformes
- Family: Callichthyidae
- Genus: Callichthys
- Species: C. serralabium

Binomial name
- Callichthys serralabium Lehmann A. & Reis, 2004

Species of fish

Callichthys serralabium is a species of freshwater ray-finned fish belonging to the subfamily Callichthyinae of the family Callichthyidae, the armoured catfishes. This species is found in South America.

== Taxonomy ==
It was originally described by Lehmann & Reis in 2004. The species name serralabium comes from the presence of a serrated lower lip in this species, which differentiates it from other members of this genus.

== Distribution ==
It originates in inland waters in South America, and is found in the upper Orinoco River and lower Rio Negro basins of the Amazon River drainage in Venezuela and Brazil.

== Description ==
C. serralabium can be distinguished from the other species of Callichthys by having the lower lip serrated (it is smooth in all other species). It also has 8–9 branched rays in the pectoral fin (instead of 6–7) and an irregular color pattern of dark, diffuse blotches on flanks of adults. The fish will grow in length up to 15.8 centimetres (6.2 in) SL.

The body is elongated and moderately depressed anteriorly; the trunk and caudal peduncle are progressively more compressed towards the caudal fin. The body profile between snout and dorsal-fin origin straight to slightly convex. The snout is rounded or roughly triangular in dorsal view. The mouth is slightly inferior (pointed downwards).

The dorsal fin and pectoral fins have one spine. The pectoral fin spine has stronger odontodes anteriorly and small retrorse hooks posteriorly. The pectoral spine of fully developed nuptial males is elongated and thick. The pelvic fins and caudal fin are rounded. The adipose fin has a pointed, depressible spine.
