= Pareiorhaphis cameroni =

Conservation status
- Near Threatened (IUCN 3.1)

Scientific classification
- Kingdom: Animalia
- Phylum: Chordata
- Class: Actinopterygii
- Division: Teleostei
- Order: Siluriformes
- Family: Loricariidae
- Genus: Pareiorhaphis
- Species: P. cameroni

Binomial name
- Pareiorhaphis cameroni (Steindachner, 1907)

Synonyms
- Psilichthys cameroni Steindachner, 1907; Hemipsilichthys cameroni (Steindachner, 1907); Hemipsilichthys calmoni (Steindachner, 1907)

Species of catfish

Pareiorhaphis cameroni is a species of freshwater ray-finned fish belonging to the family Loricariidae, the suckermouth armoured catfishes, and the subfamily Hypoptopomatinae, the cascudinhos. This catfish is endemic to Brazil.

== Taxonomy ==
Pareiorhaphis cameroni was first formally described as Psilichthys cameroni in 1907 by the Austrian ichthyologist Franz Steindachner with its type locality given as the Cubatão River (Paraná) at Colônia Teresópolis in the Brazilian state of Santa Catarina. Steindachner proposed the new genus Psilichthys when he described this species but this name was preoccuppied by the fossil fish genus †Psilichthys Hall, 1900. The species was then classified in the genus Hemipsilichthys but in 1918 Alípio de Miranda-Ribeiro proposed the genus Pareiorhaphis without designating a type species, and in 1920 Charles Tate Regan designated Hemipsilichthys calmoni as the type species of Pareiorhaphis. For some time Pareiorhaphis was regarded as a junior synonym of Hemipsilichthys but it was later found that Hemipsilichthys sensu stricto, with three species, were basal loricarids and the other species were nested within the loricarid diversity and the genus Pareiorhaphis was resurrected from its synonymy with Hemipsilichthys.

== Etymology ==
Pareiorhaphis cameroni is the type species of the genus Pareiorhaphis, the name of which is a combination pareio, derived from pareiá, which means "cheek" in Greek, and rhaphis, meaning "needle". This is a reference to the needle like hypertrophied odontodes on the cheeks of the males when they are in breeding condition. The specific name honours Miguel Calmon du Pin e Almedia, the Minister of Agriculture, Commerce and Industry in Brazil as a token of Steinfachner's "respect and gratitude". Steindachner misspelt Calmon as Cameron and the epithet calmoni is frequently used and may become the scientific name by general usage.

== Description ==
Pareiorhaphis cameroni has 7 soft rays in its dorsal fin and 6 soft rays in its anal fin. The pectoral fin overlaps with half the length of pelvic fin when flattened against the body, There is no skin flap on the dorsal margin of the pectoral-fin spine. In breeding males the pectoral-fin spines are thick, straight and richly ornamented with short hypertrophied odontodes This species has an elongate body and reaches a standard length of 17 cm (6.7 in).

== Distribution and habitat ==
Pareiorhaphis cameroni is found to the south of the Cubatão River basin, and in the Tubarão and Araranguá River basins in Santa Catarina. It is a benthopelagic fish which requires well oxygentated, cold streams, with fast currents and rocky beds and shaded by vegetation.

== Conservation status ==
Pareiorhaphis cameroni is threatened by habitat degradation caused by coal mining, pollution and deforestation. The International Union for Conservation of Nature classifies this species as Near Threatened.
