= Pareiorhaphis vetula =

Scientific classification
- Kingdom: Animalia
- Phylum: Chordata
- Class: Actinopterygii
- Order: Siluriformes
- Family: Loricariidae
- Genus: Pareiorhaphis
- Species: P. vetula

Binomial name
- Pareiorhaphis vetula E. H. L. Pereira, Lehmann A. & Reis, 2016

Species of catfish

Pareiorhaphis vetula is a species of freshwater ray-finned fish belonging to the family Loricariidae, the suckermouth armoured catfishes, and the subfamily Hypoptopomatinae, the cascudinhos. This catfish is endemic to Brazil.

== Taxonomy ==
Pareiorhaphis vetula was first formally described in 2016 by the Brazilian ichthyologists Edson H. L. Pereira, Pablo César Lehmann A. and Roberto Esser dos Reis with its type locality given as Santo Antônio do Itambé, Mãe d' Água River at Cachoeira da Ponte de Pedra, this is a tributary to Guanhães River, in the Doce River basin in the Brazilian state of Minas Gerais. Eschmeyer's Catalog of Fishes classifies the genus Pareiorhaphus in the subfamily Hypoptopomatinae, the cascudinhos, within the suckermouth armored catfish family Loricariidae.

== Etymology ==
Pareiorhaphis vetula is a species in the genus Pareiorhaphis, the name of which is a combination pareio, derived from pareiá, which means "cheek" in Greek, and rhaphis, meaning "needle". This is a reference to the needle like hypertrophied odontodes on the cheeks of the males when they are in breeding condition. The specific name, vetula, is Latin for "elderly", although the authors said that it meant "old man" or "little old man" even as they said it was an adjective, an allusion to the small adult size of this species.

== Description ==
Pareiorhaphis vetula is a small species of suckermouth armoured catfish with an irregular scattering of dark brown spots on a brown background colour over the back and sides. It differs from all other Pareiorhaphis species by having the maxillary barbel completely fused to the lower lip and in the adult males having very long, sharply pointed, conical papilla in the urogenital area. In addition, species, is also told apart from most other fishes in its genus by possessing a shorter spine in the pelvic fin, or by having many more teeth on the premaxilla and by the absence of a ssmall spine in the dorsal fin. This species reaches a standard length of 49.3 mm (1.94 in).

== Distribution ==
Pareiorhaphis vetula is endemic to Brazil and it is known from just two localities, the type locality and a tributary stream of the type locality, in the Doce River basin in Minas Gerais.
