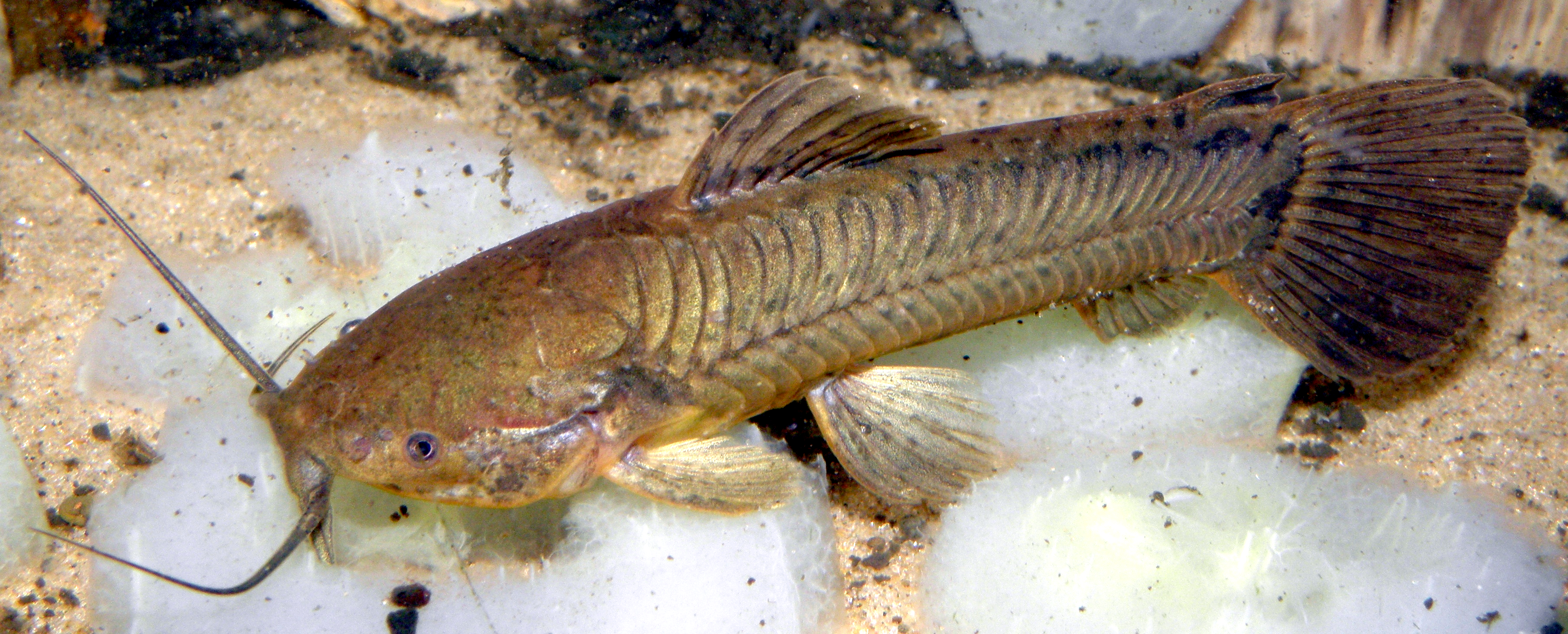
- Cascarudo (Callichthys callichthys).

Scientific classification
- Kingdom: Animalia
- Phylum: Chordata
- Class: Actinopterygii
- Order: Siluriformes
- Family: Callichthyidae
- Subfamily: Callichthyinae
- Genus: Callichthys; Scopoli, 1777

Type species
- Callichthys callichthys Linnaeus, 1758

Synonyms
- Callichthys Linck, 1790; Cataphractus Bloch, 1794

= Callichthys =

Genus of fishes

Callichthys is a genus of freshwater ray-finned fish belonging to the family Callichthyidae and the subfamily Callichthyinae, the armored catfishes. The genus Callichthys is distributed in most freshwater drainages of South America.

== Taxonomy ==
The type species for this genus is Callichtys callichthys. The name Callichthys is derived from the Greek kallos (beautiful) and ichthys (fish). 3 of the 4 species were described only relatively recently.

The genus Callichthys is in need of taxonomic work, as it includes 13 nominal species but specimens of this genus are usually referred to as C. callichthys regardless of collecting locality.

According to a 1997 paper, Callichthys is the most basal member of the subfamily. In a 2004 study, different relationships among the callichthyines were found: Dianema and Hoplosternum form the most basal clade, and Callichthys is sister to Lepthoplosternum and Megalechis.

== Species ==
There are currently four recognized species in this genus:

- Callichthys callichthys (Linnaeus, 1758) (Cascarudo)
- Callichthys fabricioi Román-Valencia, Lehmann A. & Muñoz, 1999
- Callichthys oibaensis Ardila Rodríguez, 2006
- Callichthys serralabium Lehmann A. & R. E. dos Reis, 2004

== Description ==
The genus Callichthys can be readily distinguished from other callichthyids by having the coracoids covered by skin and not exposed ventrally, the infraorbital bones also covered by skin, and the head highly depressed with less than 75% of the cleithral width (except sometimes in mature males).

== Ecology ==
Callichthys is normally found in large schools on the muddy bottoms of slow-moving rivers, pools, drainage ditches, and swampy areas. In water with low oxygen content, the fish are capable of utilizing atmospheric air by taking in a gulp of air at the surface of the water and passing it back to the hind gut. The walls of the gut are lined with tiny blood vessels into which the oxygen from the air can pass, similar to the function of true lungs. The remaining gasses pass out through the anus. When there is a severe drought, these air breathers are able to traverse short stretches of land seeking better conditions. The fish is also capable of making sounds, both grunts and squeaks.

== In the aquarium ==
Spawning has been accomplished in the aquarium. Callichthys is a builder of bubble nests from plant parts, some bottom materials, and bubbles formed by a mouth secretion and air. The male forms a mass of bubbles about 20 cm (8 in) in diameter and 10 cm (4 in) high. During the time of construction, the female is actively chased away or ignored. When the nest construction is complete, the male will accept the female. The eggs (up to several hundred) are deposited into the nest and the male or the pair will actively protect the nest for about four weeks until the fry come out of the nest at the size of 2.5 cm (1 in).
