= Pareiorhaphis bahianus =

Scientific classification
- Kingdom: Animalia
- Phylum: Chordata
- Class: Actinopterygii
- Order: Siluriformes
- Family: Loricariidae
- Genus: Pareiorhaphis
- Species: P. bahianus

Binomial name
- Pareiorhaphis bahianus (Gosline, 1947)

Synonyms
- Corymbophanes bahianus; Hemipsilichthys bahianus; Pareiorhaphis bahiana

Species of catfish

Pareiorhaphis bahianus, sometimes known as the spotted hedgehog pleco or by its associated L-number, LDA-017, is a species of catfish in the family Loricariidae. It is native to South America, where it occurs in small coastal drainage basins near Ilhéus in the state of Bahia in Brazil. The species reaches 12 cm (4.7 inches) in standard length and is believed to be a facultative air-breather.
