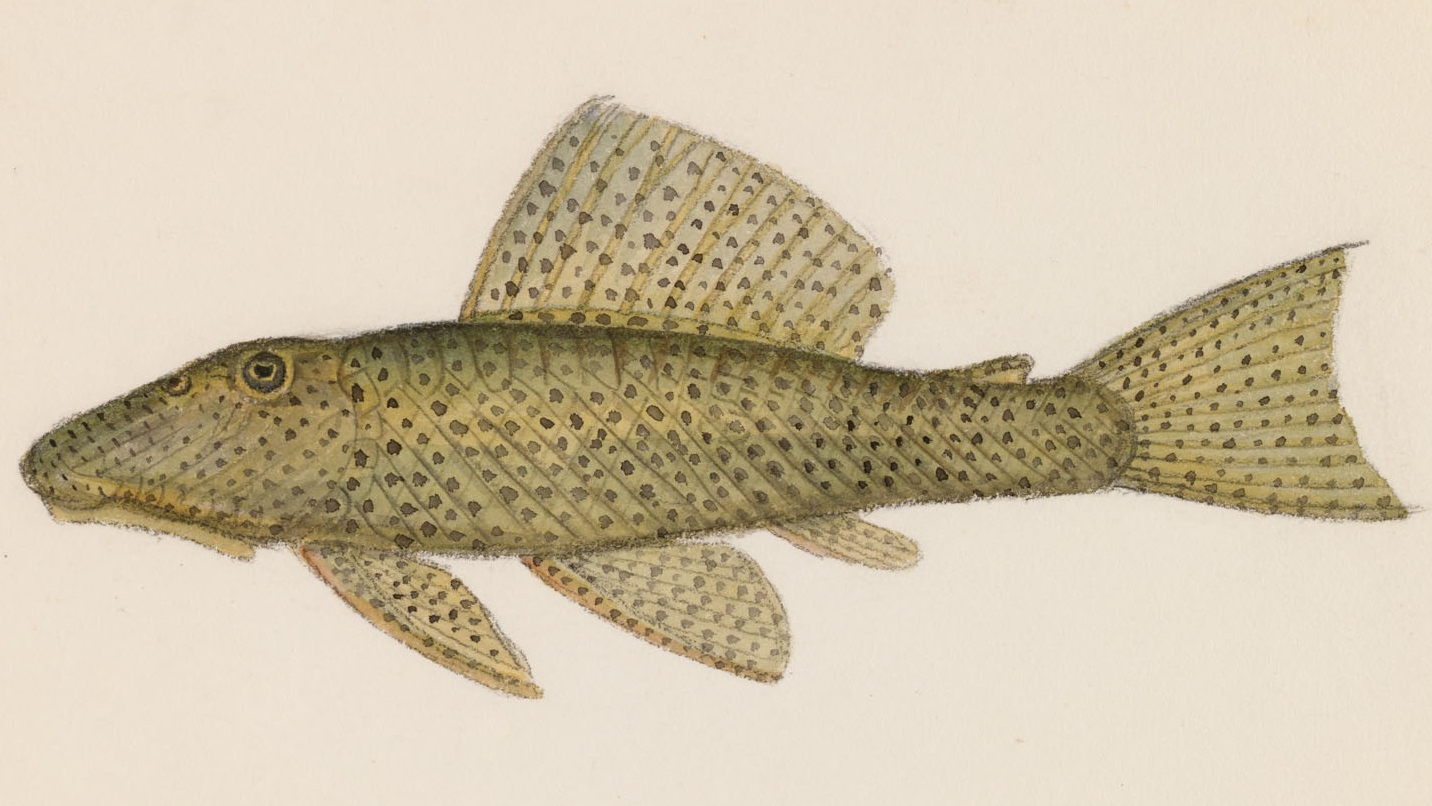

Conservation status
- Critically Endangered (IUCN 3.1)

Scientific classification
- Kingdom: Animalia
- Phylum: Chordata
- Class: Actinopterygii
- Order: Siluriformes
- Family: Loricariidae
- Genus: Delturus
- Species: D. parahybae

Binomial name
- Delturus parahybae C. H. Eigenmann & Eigenmann, 1889

= Delturus parahybae =

Species of armored catfish

Delturus parahybae is a species of freshwater ray-finned fish belonging to the family Loricariidae, the armoured suckermouth catfishes, and the subfamily Delturinae, the primitive suckermouth catfishes. This catfish is endemic to Brazil where it is restricted to the Paraíba do Sul basin in the state of Rio de Janeiro and Minas Gerais. This species attains a maximum standard length of 21 cm (8.3 in).
