= Hemipsilichthys gobio =

Conservation status
- Near Threatened (IUCN 3.1)

Scientific classification
- Kingdom: Animalia
- Phylum: Chordata
- Class: Actinopterygii
- Order: Siluriformes
- Family: Loricariidae
- Genus: Hemipsilichthys
- Species: H. gobio

Binomial name
- Hemipsilichthys gobio (Lütken, 1874)

Synonyms
- Xenomystus gobio Lütken, 1874; Upsilodus victori A. Miranda-Ribeiro 1924

Species of catfish

Hemipsilichthys gobio is a species of freshwater ray-finned fish belonging to the family Loricariidae, the armoured suckermouth catfishes, and the subfamily Delturinae, the primitive suckermouth catfishes. This catfish is endemic to Brazil where it is restricted to the Paraíba do Sul basin in the states of Minas Gerais, Rio de Janeiro and São Paulo. This species attains a maximum standard length of 15.6 cm (6.1 in).
