= Hemipsilichthys papillatus =

Conservation status
- Near Threatened (IUCN 3.1)

Scientific classification
- Kingdom: Animalia
- Phylum: Chordata
- Class: Actinopterygii
- Order: Siluriformes
- Family: Loricariidae
- Genus: Hemipsilichthys
- Species: H. papillatus

Binomial name
- Hemipsilichthys papillatus Pereira, Oliveira & Oyakawa, 2000

Species of fish

Hemipsilichthys papillatus is a species of freshwater ray-finned fish belonging to the family Loricariidae, the armoured suckermouth catfishes, and the subfamily Delturinae, the primitive suckermouth catfishes. This catfish is endemic to Brazil, where it is restricted to the Rio Preto, a tributary of the Paraíba do Sul, in the southeastern states of Minas Gerais, Rio de Janeiro and São Paulo. This species grows to a length of 9.2 centimetres (3.6 in) SL.
