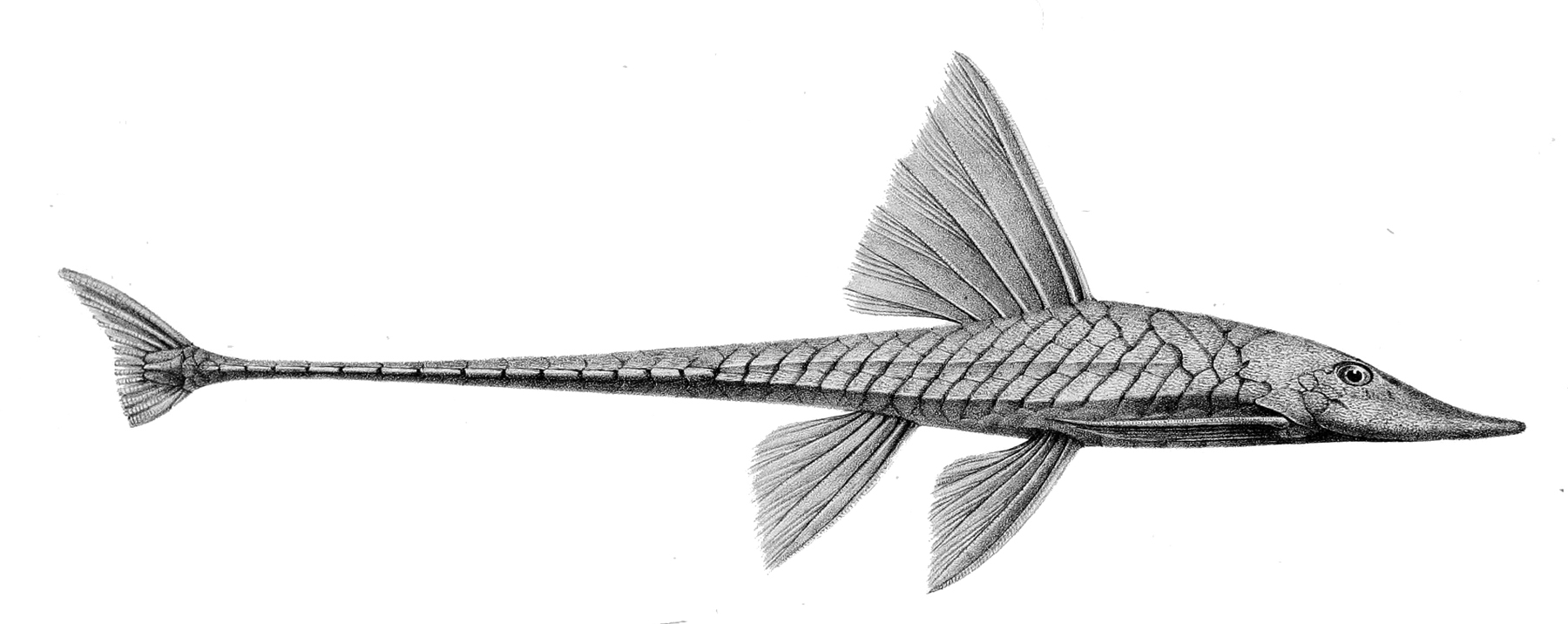
- Sturisoma guentheri

Scientific classification
- Kingdom: Animalia
- Phylum: Chordata
- Class: Actinopterygii
- Order: Siluriformes
- Family: Loricariidae
- Subfamily: Loricariinae
- Genus: Sturisoma; Swainson, 1838

Type species
- Loricaria rostrata Spix & Agassiz, 1829

Synonyms
- Oxyloricaria Bleeker, 1862; Parasturisoma A. Miranda-Ribeiro, 1911

= Sturisoma =

Genus of fishes

Sturisoma is a genus of freshwater ray-finned fish belonging to the family Loricariidae, the suckermouth armored catfishes, and the subfamily Loricariinae, the mailed catfishes. The catfishes in this genus are found in South and Central America.

== Taxonomy ==
Sturisoma has been shown to be sister to Farlowella.

== Species ==
There are currently 14 recognized species in this genus:

- Sturisoma barbatum (Kner, 1853)
- Sturisoma brevirostre (C. H. Eigenmann & Eigenmann, 1889)
- Sturisoma careirensia Londoño-Burbano & Britto, 2023
- Sturisoma defranciscoi Londoño-Burbano & Britto, 2023
- Sturisoma ghazziae Londoño-Burbano & Britto, 2023
- Sturisoma graffini Londoño-Burbano, 2018
- Sturisoma guentheri (Regan, 1904)
- Sturisoma lyra (Regan, 1904)
- Sturisoma monopelte Fowler, 1914
- Sturisoma nigrirostrum Fowler, 1940
- Sturisoma rapppydanielae Londoño-Burbano & Britto, 2023
- Sturisoma reisi Londoño-Burbano and Britto, 2022
- Sturisoma rostratum (Spix & Agassiz, 1829)
- Sturisoma tenuirostre (Steindachner, 1910)

== Distribution ==
The species of the genus Sturisoma are widely distributed on both slopes of the Andes, in Panama and Colombia, and in the Amazon, Orinoco, and Paraná River basins.

== Description ==
Sexual dimorphism includes hypertrophied odontodes on the sides of the head of the male.

== Ecology ==
Sturisoma inhabit gently to swiftly flowing white waters where submerged wood is abundant in the main flow of rivers. Sturisoma species are open brooders.
