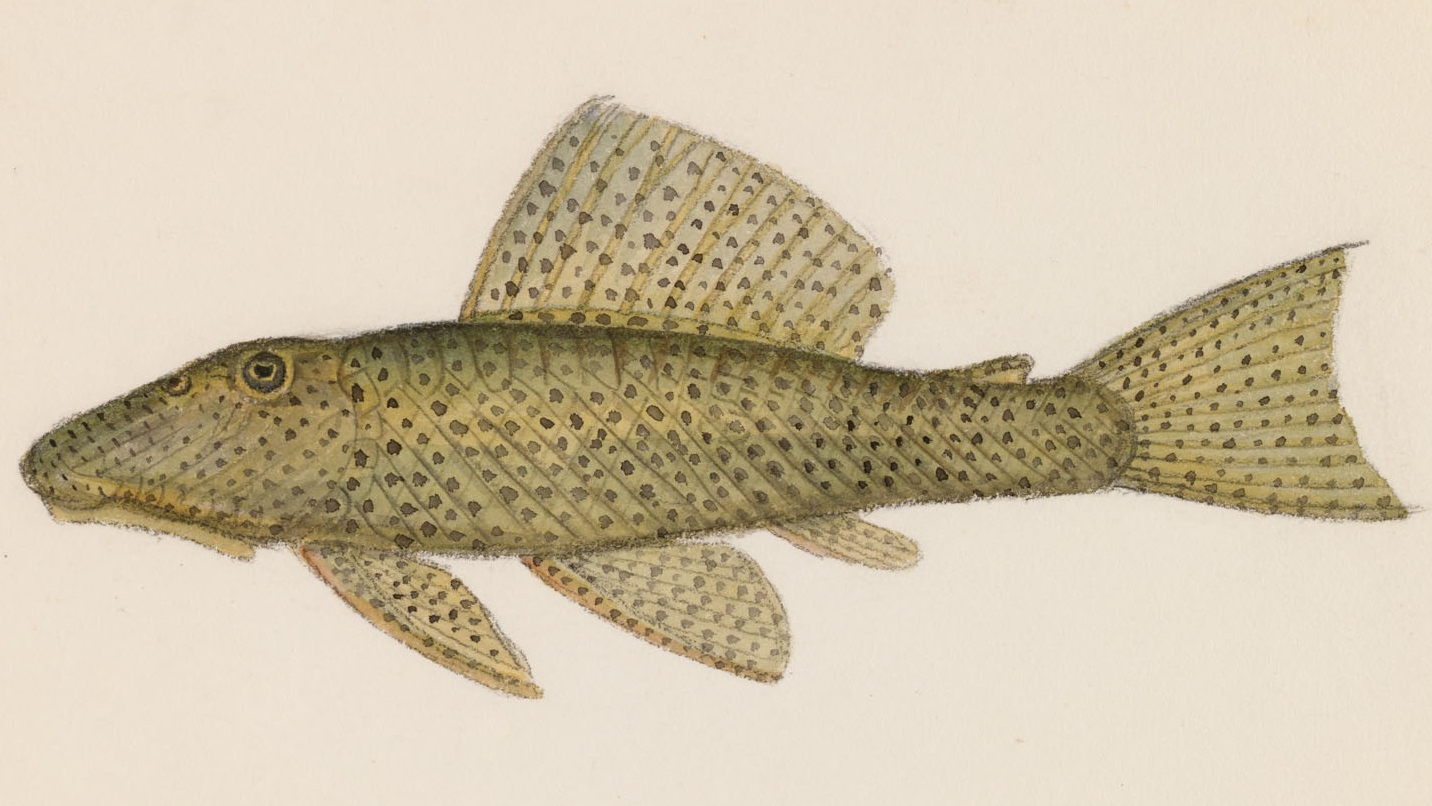
- Delturus parahybae (Parahiba, Brazil, 24 May 1865)

Scientific classification
- Kingdom: Animalia
- Phylum: Chordata
- Class: Actinopterygii
- Division: Teleostei
- Order: Siluriformes
- Family: Loricariidae
- Subfamily: Delturinae
- Genus: Delturus; C. H. Eigenmann & R. S. Eigenmann, 1889

Type species
- Delturus parahybae C. H. Eigenmann & R. S. Eigenmann, 1889

Synonyms
- Carinotus La Monte, 1933

= Delturus =

Genus of fishes

Delturus is a genus of freshwater ray-finned fishes belonging to the family Loricariidae, the suckermouth armored catfishes. It is the type genus of the subfamily Delturinae, the catfishes in this subfamily are known as primitive suckermouth catfishes. These catfishes are endemic to Brazil.

== Taxonomy ==
Delturus was first proposed as a genus in 1889 by the American ichthyologists Carl H. Eigenmann and Rosa Smith Eigenmann with two species, D. angulicauda and D. parahybae, contained within it and with D. parahybae being designated as the type species. In 2006 Roberto Esser dos Reis, E. H. L. Pereira & Jonathan W. Armbruster proposed the new subfamily Delturinae for ths genus and the related genus, Hemipsilichthys. The subfamily is the sister group to all the other taxa within the Loricariidae, except for the genus Lithogenes. The Loricariidae is classified within the suborder Loricarioidei of the catfish order Siluriformes.

== Species ==
Delturus contains the following valid species:

- Delturus angulicauda (Steindachner, 1877)
- Delturus brevis Reis & Pereira, 2006
- Delturus carinotus (La Monte, 1933)
- Delturus parahybae C. H. Eigenmann & R. S. Eigenmann, 1889

== Characteristics ==
Delturus is distinguished from Hemipsilichthys by their larger size, most species reaching standard lengths up to 20 cm (7.9 in), more robust bodies, large eyes and the membrane of the dorsal fin extends rearwards and touches the first plat in front of the adipose fin.

== Distribution ==
Delturus catfishes, and the subfamily Delturinae, are endemic to Brazil where they are restricted to the southeastern part of the Brazilian Shield with each species occurring in a different river system. This distribution suggests that southeastern Brazil acts as either a refugium for basal loricariid taxa or the region where the Loricariidae originate.
