= Delturus angulicauda =

Conservation status
- Least Concern (IUCN 3.1)

Scientific classification
- Kingdom: Animalia
- Phylum: Chordata
- Class: Actinopterygii
- Order: Siluriformes
- Family: Loricariidae
- Genus: Delturus
- Species: D. angulicauda

Binomial name
- Delturus angulicauda (Steindachner, 1877)

Synonyms
- Plecostomus angulicauda Steindachner, 1877

Species of armored catfish

Delturus angulicauda is a species of freshwater ray-finned fish belonging to the family Loricariidae, the armoured suckermouth catfishes, and the subfamily Delturinae, the primitive suckermouth catfishes. This catfish is endemic to Brazil where it is restricted to the Mucuri River basin in the states of Minas Gerais and Bahia. This species attains a maximum standard length of 12.7 cm (5.0 in).
