= S. robustum =

S. robustum may refer to:

- Saccharum robustum, a plant species found in New Guinea
- Sason robustum, a trapdoor spider species only found in southern India, Sri Lanka and the Seychelles
- Sturisoma robustum, a catfish species
