= Pareiorhaphis cerosus =

Scientific classification
- Kingdom: Animalia
- Phylum: Chordata
- Class: Actinopterygii
- Order: Siluriformes
- Family: Loricariidae
- Genus: Pareiorhaphis
- Species: P. cerosus

Binomial name
- Pareiorhaphis cerosus (Miranda-Ribeiro, 1951)

Synonyms
- Hemipsilichthys cerosus

Species of catfish

Pareiorhaphis cerosus is a species of catfish in the family Loricariidae. It is a freshwater fish native to South America, where it occurs in coastal drainage basins in eastern Brazil. The species reaches 11 cm (4.3 inches) in standard length and is believed to be a facultative air-breather.
