= Pareiorhaphis lophia =

Conservation status
- Least Concern (IUCN 3.1)

Scientific classification
- Kingdom: Animalia
- Phylum: Chordata
- Class: Actinopterygii
- Order: Siluriformes
- Family: Loricariidae
- Genus: Pareiorhaphis
- Species: P. lophia

Binomial name
- Pareiorhaphis lophia E. H. L. Pereira & Zanata, 2014

Species of catfish

Pareiorhaphis lophia is a species of freshwater ray-finned fish belonging to the family Loricariidae, the suckermouth armoured catfishes, and the subfamily Hypoptopomatinae, the cascudinhos. This catfish is endemic to Brazil.

== Taxonomy ==
Pareiorhaphis lophia was first formally described in 2014 by the Brazilian ichthyologists Edson H. L. Pereira and Angela M. Zanata with its type locality given as Bahia State, Lençóis, Paraguaçu River drainage, Santo Antônio River at a bridge on the BR-242 road at 12°29’37"S, 41°19’38"W, from an elevation of 350 m (1,150 ft). Eschmeyer's Catalog of Fishes classifies the genus Pareiorhaphus in the subfamily Hypoptopomatinae, the cascudinhos, within the suckermouth armored catfish family Loricariidae.

== Etymology ==
Pareiorhaphis lophia is a species in the genus Pareiorhaphis, the name of which is a combination pareio, derived from pareiá, which means "cheek" in Greek, and rhaphis, meaning "needle". This is a reference to the needle like hypertrophied odontodes on the cheeks of the males when they are in breeding condition. The specific name, lophia, means "crest" or "ridge", an allusion to the obvious bump on the lower ridge which is a feature that identifies this species.

== Description ==
Pareiorhaphis lophia has 7 soft rays in its dorsal fin and 6 in its anal fin. It can be distinguished from all other species in the genus Pareiprhaphis by two characteristics. The first is a skin fold locatedjust torhe rear of each emergent tooth series on the dentary formed by a single enlarged, flattened papilla; the second is that the midline of lower lip just behind the dentaries has a small patch of distinct papillae that form a short median bump. This species has a fusiform shaped body and reaches a standard length of 8.2 cm (3.2 in).

== Distribution and habitat ==
Pareiorhaphis lophia is endemic to Brazilwhere it is known only from the middle portion of the Paraguaçu River and two tributaries in its upper reaches in Bahia. This species needs a rocky substrate and strong current.
