= Pareiorhaphis togoroi =

Scientific classification
- Kingdom: Animalia
- Phylum: Chordata
- Class: Actinopterygii
- Order: Siluriformes
- Family: Loricariidae
- Genus: Pareiorhaphis
- Species: P. togoroi

Binomial name
- Pareiorhaphis togoroi Oliveira & Oyakawa, 2019

Species of catfish

Pareiorhaphis togoroi is a species of freshwater ray-finned fish belonging to the family Loricariidae, the suckermouth armoured catfishes, and the subfamily Hypoptopomatinae, the cascudinhos. This catfish is endemic to Brazil.

== Taxonomy ==
Pareiorhaphis togoroi was first formally described in 2019 by José Carlos de Oliveira and Osvaldo Takeshi Oyakawa whith its type locality given as the Rio das Mortes, in the upper Rio Paraná drainage of the Rio Grande basin, Barbacena, Minas Gerais at 21°13'10"S, 43°37'57.6"W, from an elevation of 1,165 m (3,822 ft)> This species belongs to the genus Pareiorhaphis which Eschmeyer's Catalog of Fishes classifies in the subfamily Hypoptopomatinae, the cascudinhos, within the suckermouth armored catfish family Loricariidae.

== Etymology ==
Pareiorhaphis togoroi is a species in the genus Pareiorhaphis, the name of which is a combination pareio, derived from pareiá, which means "cheek" in Greek, and rhaphis, meaning "needle". This is a reference to the needle like hypertrophied odontodes on the cheeks of the males when they are in breeding condition. The specific name honours Eduardo Shinji Togoro who was when this species was described a graduate student at Federal University of Juiz de Fora, in recognition of his hard working contribution to the study of the fishes of the Mantiqueira Mountains, which he worked on for his undergraduate dissertation.

== Description ==
Pareiorhaphis togoroi can be distinguished from most other catfishes in its genus by the absence of unpaired plates in front of the adipose fin and, in the mature males, the presence of odontodes along the side of the head plus the absence of long hypertrophied odontodes on spine of the pectoral fin. This species reaches a standard length of 6.44 cm (2.54 in).

== Distribution ==
Pareiorhaphis togoroi is endemic to Brazil where it is known only from the upper portion of the Rio das Mortes and two of its tributaries in Minas Gerais.
