= Pareiorhaphis proskynita =

Conservation status
- Least Concern (IUCN 3.1)

Scientific classification
- Kingdom: Animalia
- Phylum: Chordata
- Class: Actinopterygii
- Order: Siluriformes
- Family: Loricariidae
- Genus: Pareiorhaphis
- Species: P. proskynita

Binomial name
- Pareiorhaphis proskynita E. H. L. Pereira & Britto, 2012

Species of catfish

Pareiorhaphis proskynita is a species of freshwater ray-finned fish belonging to the family Loricariidae, the suckermouth armoured catfishes, and the subfamily Hypoptopomatinae, the cascudinhos. This catfish is endemic to Brazil.

== Taxonomy ==
Pareiorhaphis proskynita was first formally described in 2012 by the Brazilian ichthyologists Edson H. L. Pereira and Marcelo R. Britto with its type locality given as Catas Altas, Doce River drainage, Ribeirão Caraça, a tributary of Piracicaba River, at locality of Taboões in the Reserva Particular do Patrimômio Natural (R.P.P.N.) Santuário do Caraça, Serra do Caraça, at 20°04'54"S, 43°30'20"W, Minas Gerais . Eschmeyer's Catalog of Fishes classifies the genus Pareiorhaphus in the subfamily Hypoptopomatinae, the cascudinhos, within the suckermouth armored catfish family Loricariidae.

== Etymology ==
Pareiorhaphis proskynita is a species in the genus Pareiorhaphis, the name of which is a combination pareio, derived from pareiá, which means "cheek" in Greek, and rhaphis, meaning "needle". This is a reference to the needle like hypertrophied odontodes on the cheeks of the males when they are in breeding condition. The specific name, proskynita, means "worshipper", although in this case it means "pilgrim". The pilgrimage sit of the Santuário do Caraça was founded by Brother Lourenço in 1770s and is now surrounded by a protected area in which the type locality of this species is located.

== Description ==
Pareiorhaphis proskynita has 8softrays in its dorsal fin and 6 in its anal fin. This species is distinguished from all its congeners by its distinctive coloration which has large and obvu=ious dark brown blotches irregularly scattered over a yellowish tan ground colour on the ead, along the back and sides. There is a shallow depression at the rear unpaired plates where the adipose fin would have been. This species reaches a standard length of 9.6 cm (3.8 in).

== Distribution and habitat ==
Pareiorhaphis proskynita is endemic to Brazil where it occurs only in the Doce River basin in Minas Gerais. It is thought that its entire distribution is incopassed within the protected area surrounding the Santuário do Caraça. This species is found above 1,000 m (3,300 ft) a.s.l. the streams it occurs in have black waters with fast currents waters, are shallow, with stretches of pools between rapids, and have rocky boulder strewn beds made up of by boulders, pebbles, and iron ore gravel.
