= Pareiorhaphis parmula =

Conservation status
- Least Concern (IUCN 3.1)

Scientific classification
- Kingdom: Animalia
- Phylum: Chordata
- Class: Actinopterygii
- Order: Siluriformes
- Family: Loricariidae
- Genus: Pareiorhaphis
- Species: P. parmula

Binomial name
- Pareiorhaphis parmula E. H. L. Pereira, 2005

Species of catfish

Pareiorhaphis parmula is a species of freshwater ray-finned fish belonging to the family Loricariidae, the suckermouth armoured catfishes, and the subfamily Hypoptopomatinae, the cascudinhos. This catfish is endemic to Brazil.

== Taxonomy ==
Pareiorhaphis parmula was first formally described in 2005 by the Brazilian ichthyologist Edson H. L. Pereira with its type locality given as the Patos River, a tributary to the Rio dos Varzea River in the Iguazu River basin, on road PR-427 from Lapa to Campo do Tenente at 25°50'36.8"S, 49°43'39.2"W, in the municipality of Lapa in the Brazilian state of Paraná. Eschmeyer's Catalog of Fishes classifies the genus Pareiorhaphus in the subfamily Hypoptopomatinae, the cascudinhos, within the suckermouth armored catfish family Loricariidae.

== Etymology ==
Pareiorhaphis parmula is a species in the genus Pareiorhaphis, the name of which is a combination pareio, derived from pareiá, which means "cheek" in Greek, and rhaphis, meaning "needle". This is a reference to the needle like hypertrophied odontodes on the cheeks of the males when they are in breeding condition. The specific name, parmula, is the diminutive of parma, a small shield, and is an allusion to the small plate located towards the ventral part of the gill slit.

== Description ==
Pareiorhaphis parmula is identified from its congeners by the small plate which is located on each side of the pectoral girdle just behind the gill slit. In adult males the spine in the pectoral fin] is club-shaped, wider at the tip than at the base. The body is elongated in shape.

== Distribution ==
Pareiorhaphis parmula is endemic to Brazil where it occurs in the middle and upper-middle basin of the Iuazu River in the states of Paraña and Santa Catarina.
