= Delturus carinotus =

Conservation status
- Least Concern (IUCN 3.1)

Scientific classification
- Kingdom: Animalia
- Phylum: Chordata
- Class: Actinopterygii
- Order: Siluriformes
- Family: Loricariidae
- Genus: Delturus
- Species: D. carinotus

Binomial name
- Delturus carinotus (La Monte, 1933)

Synonyms
- Plecostomus (Carinotus) carinotus La Monte, 1933

Species of armored catfish

Delturus carinotus is a species of freshwater ray-finned fish belonging to the family Loricariidae, the armoured suckermouth catfishes, and the subfamily Delturinae, the primitive suckermouth catfishes. This catfish is endemic to Brazil where it is restricted to the Doce River basin in the states of Minas Gerais and Espírito Santo. This species attains a maximum standard length of 23.5 cm (9.3 in).
