= Sturisoma monopelte =

Conservation status
- Least Concern (IUCN 3.1)

Scientific classification
- Kingdom: Animalia
- Phylum: Chordata
- Class: Actinopterygii
- Order: Siluriformes
- Family: Loricariidae
- Genus: Sturisoma
- Species: S. monopelte

Binomial name
- Sturisoma monopelte Fowler, 1914

Species of fish

Sturisoma monopelte is a species of freshwater ray-finned fish belonging to the family Loricariidae, the suckermouth armored catfishes, and the subfamily Loricariinae, the mailed catfishes. This catfish occurs in the Rupununi and Branco River basins in Guyana and Brazil. This species reaches a standard length of 26.5 cm (10.4 in). Fishes in the genus Sturisoma are facultative air breathers.
