= Sturisoma graffini =

Conservation status
- Vulnerable (IUCN 3.1)

Scientific classification
- Kingdom: Animalia
- Phylum: Chordata
- Class: Actinopterygii
- Division: Teleostei
- Order: Siluriformes
- Family: Loricariidae
- Genus: Sturisoma
- Species: S. graffini

Binomial name
- Sturisoma graffini Londoño-Burbano, 2018

Species of catfish

Sturisoma graffini is a species of freshwater ray-finned fish belonging to the family Loricariidae, the suckermouth armored catfishes, and the subfamily Loricariinae, the mailed catfishes. This catfish occurs in the Madre de Dios River basin, as well as in the drainages of the Manu and Tambopata, in Peru. It may also be found in Bolivia. It was described in 2018 by Alejandro Londoño-Burbano of the Federal University of Rio de Janeiro on the basis of its distinctive coloration and morphology.

== Etymology ==
The fish is named in honor of Greg Graffin (b. 1964), lead singer of the punk rock band Bad Religion, Ph.D. in Zoology, part time life sciences, palaeontology and evolution professor at University of California, Los Angeles and Cornell University.
