= Callichthys oibaensis =

Conservation status
- Near Threatened (IUCN 3.1)

Scientific classification
- Kingdom: Animalia
- Phylum: Chordata
- Class: Actinopterygii
- Order: Siluriformes
- Family: Callichthyidae
- Genus: Callichthys
- Species: C. oibaensis

Binomial name
- Callichthys oibaensis Ardila Rodríguez, 2006

Species of fishes

Callichthys oibaensis is a species of freshwater ray-finned fish belonging to the subfamily Callichthyinae of the family Callichthyidae, the armoured catfishes. This catfish is endemic to Colombia, it is only known from the Oibita River, a tributary of the Suarez River in the Magdalena River system in the Santander Department,
