= Sturisoma reisi =

Scientific classification
- Kingdom: Animalia
- Phylum: Chordata
- Class: Actinopterygii
- Order: Siluriformes
- Family: Loricariidae
- Genus: Sturisoma
- Species: S. reisi

Binomial name
- Sturisoma reisi Londoño-Burbano and Britto, 2022

Species of catfish

Sturisoma reisi is a species of freshwater ray-finned fish belonging to the family Loricariidae, the suckermouth armored catfishes, and the subfamily Loricariinae, the mailed catfishes.This catfish occurs in the Cautário River, the Guaporé River, the Ji-Paraná River, the Mamoré River, and the Sotério River in the Madeira River basin in Bolivia and Brazil. It was described in 2022 by Alejandro Londoño-Burbano and Marcelo Ribeiro de Britto of the Federal University of Rio de Janeiro on the basis of distinctive genetic and morphological characteristics.

== Etymology ==
The fish is named in honor of the authors’ colleague, Brazilian ichthyologist Roberto E. Reis, of the Pontificia Universidade Católica do Rio Grande do Sul, for his contributions to Neotropical ichthyology.
