= Sturisoma rostratum =

Conservation status
- Least Concern (IUCN 3.1)

Scientific classification
- Kingdom: Animalia
- Phylum: Chordata
- Class: Actinopterygii
- Order: Siluriformes
- Family: Loricariidae
- Genus: Sturisoma
- Species: S. rostratum

Binomial name
- Sturisoma rostratum (Spix & Agassiz, 1829)

Species of fish

Sturisoma rostratum s a species of freshwater ray-finned fish belonging to the family Loricariidae, the suckermouth armored catfishes, and the subfamily Loricariinae, the mailed catfishes. This catfish is endemic to Brazil where it occurs in the Tocantins and Araguaia Rivers in the Federal District and states of Goiás and Tocantins. This species reaches a standard length of 19 cm (7.5 in). Fishes in the genus Sturisoma are facultative air breathers. S. rostratum was first formally described as Loricaria rostrata in 1829 by Johann Baptist von Spix and Louis Agassiz with its type locality given as "Brazilian rivers". In 1838 William Swainson proposed the monospecific genus Sturisoma, with L. rostrata as its only species meaning that this species is the type species of that genus by momotypy.
