= Sturisoma lyra =

Conservation status
- Least Concern (IUCN 3.1)

Scientific classification
- Kingdom: Animalia
- Phylum: Chordata
- Class: Actinopterygii
- Order: Siluriformes
- Family: Loricariidae
- Genus: Sturisoma
- Species: S. lyra

Binomial name
- Sturisoma lyra (Regan, 1904)

Synonyms
- Oxyloricaria lyra Regan, 1904

Species of fish

Sturisoma lyra is a species of freshwater ray-finned fishbelonging to the family Loricariidae, the suckermouth armored catfishes, and the subfamily Loricariinae, the mailed catfishes. This catfish occurs in the Madeira, Solimões, Juruá, Purus, Ucayali and lower Amazon River basins, being found in Brazil, Bolivia, Peru and Colombia . This species reaches a standard length of 25 cm (9.8 in). Fishes in the genus Sturisoma are facultative air breathers.
