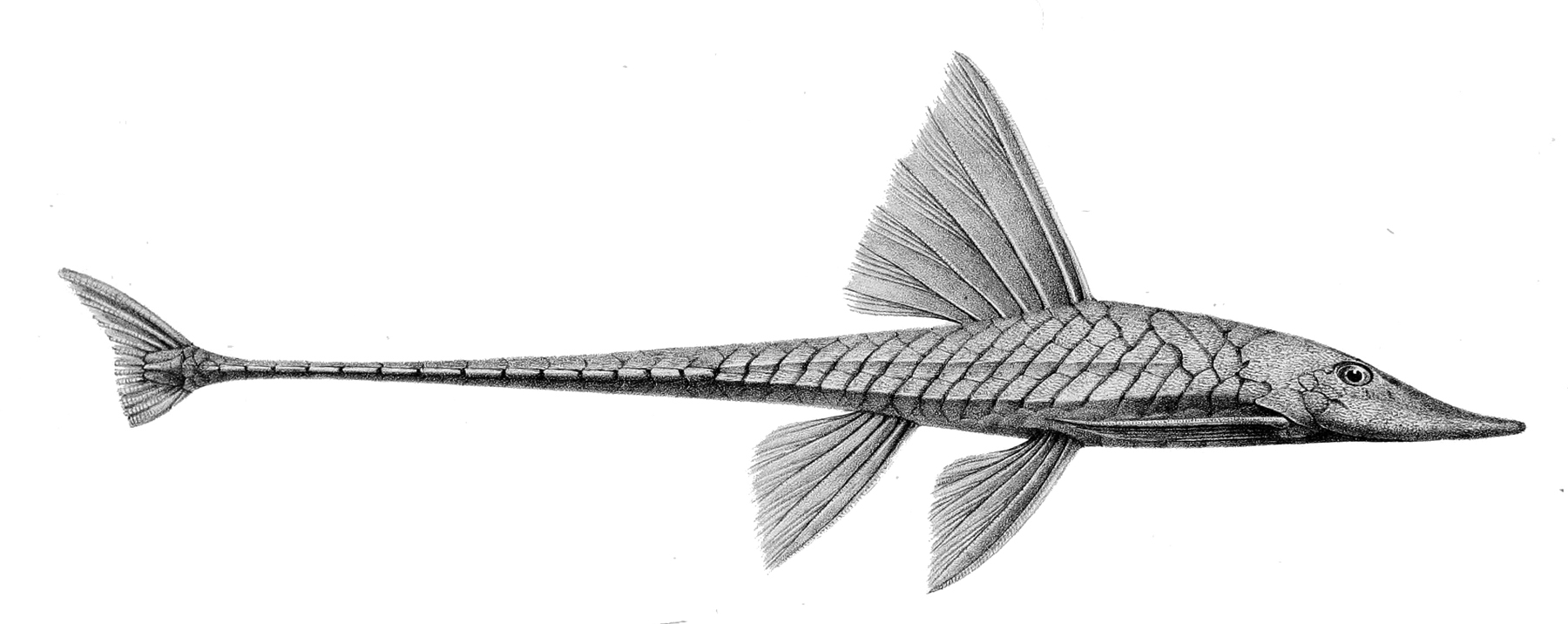

Conservation status
- Least Concern (IUCN 3.1)

Scientific classification
- Kingdom: Animalia
- Phylum: Chordata
- Class: Actinopterygii
- Order: Siluriformes
- Family: Loricariidae
- Genus: Sturisoma
- Species: S. guentheri

Binomial name
- Sturisoma guentheri (Regan, 1904)

Synonyms
- Oxyloricaria guentheri Regan, 1904

= Sturisoma guentheri =

Species of fish

Sturisoma guentheri is a species of freshwater ray-finned fish belonging to the family Loricariidae, the suckermouth armored catfishes, and the subfamily Loricariinae, the mailed catfishes. This catfish occurs in the Amazon basin in Peru and Ecuador. This species reaches a standard length of 23 cm (9.1 in). Fishes in the genus Sturisoma are facultative air breathers.
