= Callichthys fabricioi =

Conservation status
- Vulnerable (IUCN 3.1)

Scientific classification
- Kingdom: Animalia
- Phylum: Chordata
- Class: Actinopterygii
- Order: Siluriformes
- Family: Callichthyidae
- Genus: Callichthys
- Species: C. fabricioi

Binomial name
- Callichthys fabricioi Román-Valencia, Lehmann A. & Muñoz, 1999

Species of fish

Callichthys fabricioi is a species of fershwater ray-finned fish belonging to the subfamily Callichthyinae of the family Callichthyidae, the armoured catfishes. This fish has a maximum standard length of 12.5 cm (4.9 in). C. fabricioi is found in the trans-Andean upper Cauca River in the Magdalena River basin of Colombia. Although described in 1999, two other cogener fish have since been discovered.
