= Sturisoma brevirostre =

Conservation status
- Data Deficient (IUCN 3.1)

Scientific classification
- Kingdom: Animalia
- Phylum: Chordata
- Class: Actinopterygii
- Order: Siluriformes
- Family: Loricariidae
- Genus: Sturisoma
- Species: S. brevirostre

Binomial name
- Sturisoma brevirostre (C. H. Eigenmann & R. S. Eigenmann, 1889)

Synonyms
- Loricaria brevirostris C. H. EIgenmann & R. S. Eigenmann, 1889

Species of fish

Sturisoma brevirostre is a species of freshwater ray-finned fish belonging to the family Loricariidae, the suckermouth armored catfishes, and the subfamily Loricariinae, the mailed catfishes. This catfish is known only from its type locality, the Içá River basin in Amazonas, Brazil. This species grows to a standard length of 20.7 cm (8.1 in).
