= Sturisoma nigrirostrum =

Conservation status
- Least Concern (IUCN 3.1)

Scientific classification
- Kingdom: Animalia
- Phylum: Chordata
- Class: Actinopterygii
- Order: Siluriformes
- Family: Loricariidae
- Genus: Sturisoma
- Species: S. nigrirostrum

Binomial name
- Sturisoma nigrirostrum Fowler, 1940

Species of fish

Sturisoma nigrirostrum is a species of freshwater ray-finned fish belonging to the family Loricariidae, the suckermouth armored catfishes, and the subfamily Loricariinae, the mailed catfishes. This catfish occurs in the Ucayali, Marañon and Amazon River basins in Peru, and in the Orthon, Madre de Dios, Beni, Acre and Madera River basins in Bolivia. This species reaches a standard length of 22 cm (8.7 in). Fishes in the genus Sturisoma are facultative air breathers.
