= Sturisoma tenuirostre =

Conservation status
- Least Concern (IUCN 3.1)

Scientific classification
- Kingdom: Animalia
- Phylum: Chordata
- Class: Actinopterygii
- Order: Siluriformes
- Family: Loricariidae
- Genus: Sturisoma
- Species: S. tenuirostre

Binomial name
- Sturisoma tenuirostre (Steindachner, 1910)

Synonyms
- Oxyloricaria renuirostris Steindachner, 1910

Species of fish

Sturisoma tenuirostre is a species of freshwater ray-finned fish belonging to the family Loricariidae, the suckermouth armored catfishes, and the subfamily Loricariinae, the mailed catfishes. This catfish occurs in the Orinoco basin in Venezuela. This species reaches a standard length of 12.6 cm (5.0 in). Fishes in the genus Sturisoma are facultative air breathers.
