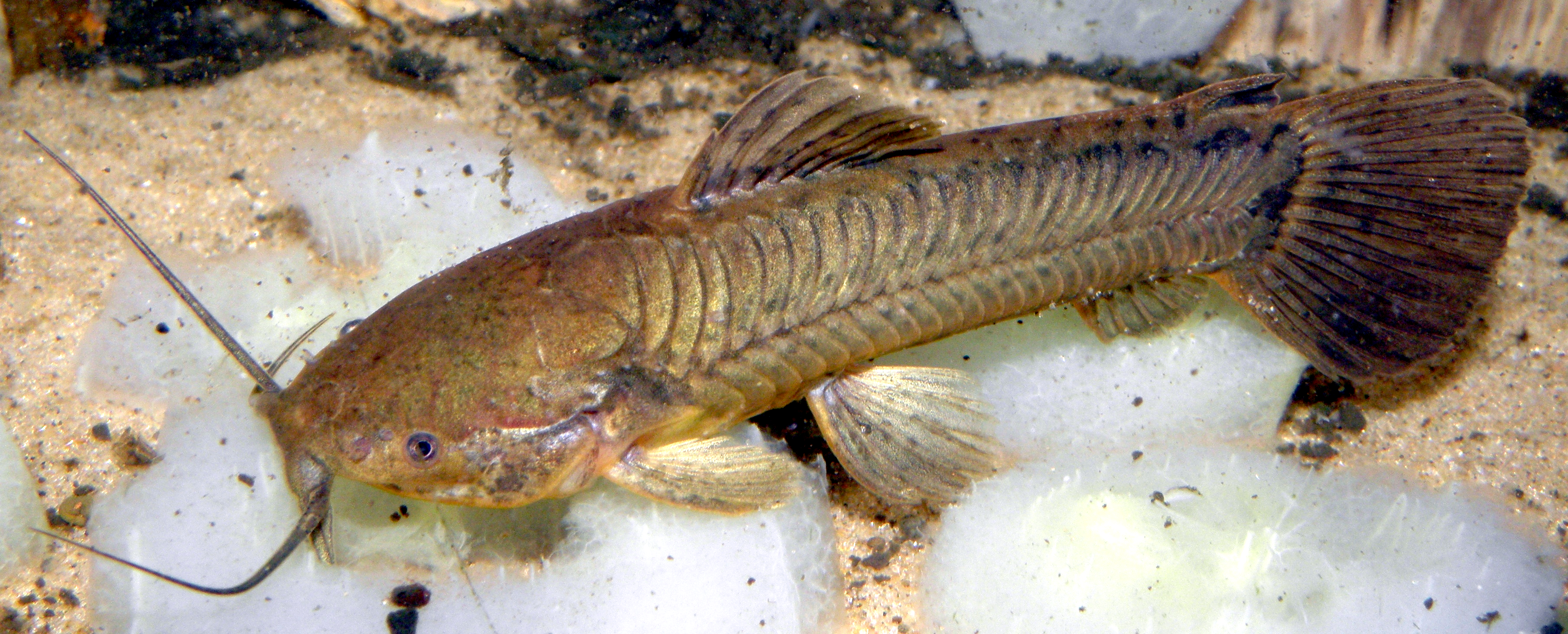
- Cascarudo (Callichthys callichthys)

Conservation status
- Least Concern (IUCN 3.1)

Scientific classification
- Kingdom: Animalia
- Phylum: Chordata
- Class: Actinopterygii
- Division: Teleostei
- Order: Siluriformes
- Family: Callichthyidae
- Genus: Callichthys
- Species: C. callichthys

Binomial name
- Callichthys callichthys (Linnaeus, 1758)

Synonyms
- Silurus callichthys Linnaeus, 1758; Callichthys asper Quoy & Gaimard, 1824; Cataphractus depressus Swainson, 1839; Callichthys asper Valenciennes, 1840; Callichthys caelatus Valenciennes, 1840; Callichthys laeviceps Valenciennes, 1840; Callichthys loricatus Gronow, 1854; Callichthys kneri Gill, 1858; Callichthys affinis Günther, 1864; Callichthys tamoata Bleeker, 1864; Callichthys arcifer Hensel, 1868; Callichthys hemiphractus Hensel, 1868; Callichthys callichthys bolteni Hoedeman, 1952; Callichthys callichthys demararae Hoedeman, 1952

= Callichthys callichthys =

Species of fish

Callichthys callichthys, the cascarudo, armored catfish, bubblenest catfish, hassar, or mailed catfish, is a species of freshwater ray-finned fish belonging to the subfamily Callichthyinae of the family Callichthyidae, the armoured catfishes.

== Taxonomy ==
It was originally described as Silurus callichthys by Linnaeus in 1758. It is likely to represent a species complex.

== Distribution ==
C. callichthys is distributed in all major river drainages of South America. It is very wide-ranging, extending from Trinidad to Buenos Aires, Argentina, including the upper Amazon River and Paraguay River systems.

== Description ==
The fish will grow in length up to eight inches (20 centimeters). The females are larger and more robust, and are a dull olive-green, while the males are brighter in color, exhibiting a delicate blue or violet sheen laterally, with a more developed and longer pectoral fin spine that is reddish-brown and edged with orange or reddish-orange.

== Ecology ==
It lives in a variety of water types, from anoxic conditions (slack water zones surrounded by dense vegetation) to slightly turbid, but free-flowing, streams. It can be found in waters with pH range of 5.8 to 8.3, a water hardness of 0 to 30 dGH, and a temperature range of 64 to 83 °F (18 to 28 °C). When its biotype becomes dry, it can move out of the water, due to its ability to swallow air and use its intestines to absorb oxygen from the atmosphere, to find more water.

It feeds at night on fish, insects, and plant matter. Juveniles feed on rotifers, in addition to the microcrustaceans and aquatic insect larvae they find when digging into the substrate.

During reproduction, the male's belly turns orange and its pectoral spines become longer and thicker. The male builds a bubble nest with some floating plants, fiercely guarding it after the female lays down her eggs.

== Relationship to humans ==
The cascarudo is of commercial importance in the aquarium trade industry and of minor importance as a food source. It can be kept in aquariums, with groups of more than five individuals recommended.

== See also ==
- List of freshwater aquarium fish species
