= Abre Campo =

- Municipality
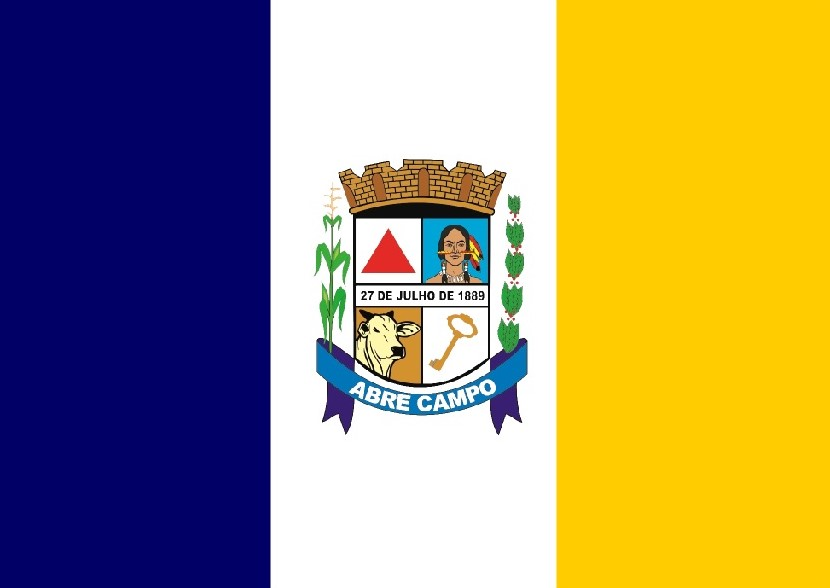
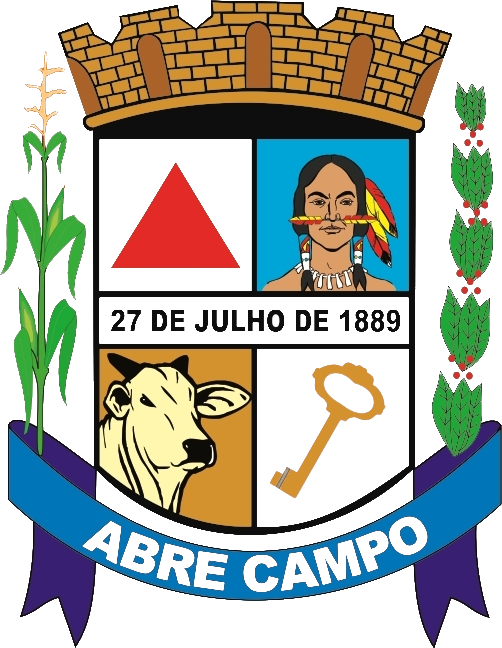
- Flag Coat of arms

- Location in Minas Gerais

- Location in Brazil
- Coordinates: 20°18′03″S 42°28′40″W
- Country: Brazil
- Region: Southeast
- State: Minas Gerais
- Mesoregion: Zona da Mata
- Microregion: Manhuaçu
- Founded: July 27th, 1889

Government
  - Mayor: Márcio Moreira Victor

Area
  - Total: 470.551 km^{2} (181.681 sq mi)

Population (2020)
  - Total: 13,444
- (estimated)
- Time zone: UTC−3 (BRT)
- CEP postal code: 35365-000
- Area code: 31
- HDI: 0,654
- Website: abrecampo.mg.gov.br

Abre Campo is a city in the Brazilian state of Minas Gerais. The city belongs to the mesoregion of Zona da Mata and to the microregion of Manhuaçu. In 2020, its population was estimated to be 13,444.

== See also ==
- List of municipalities in Minas Gerais
