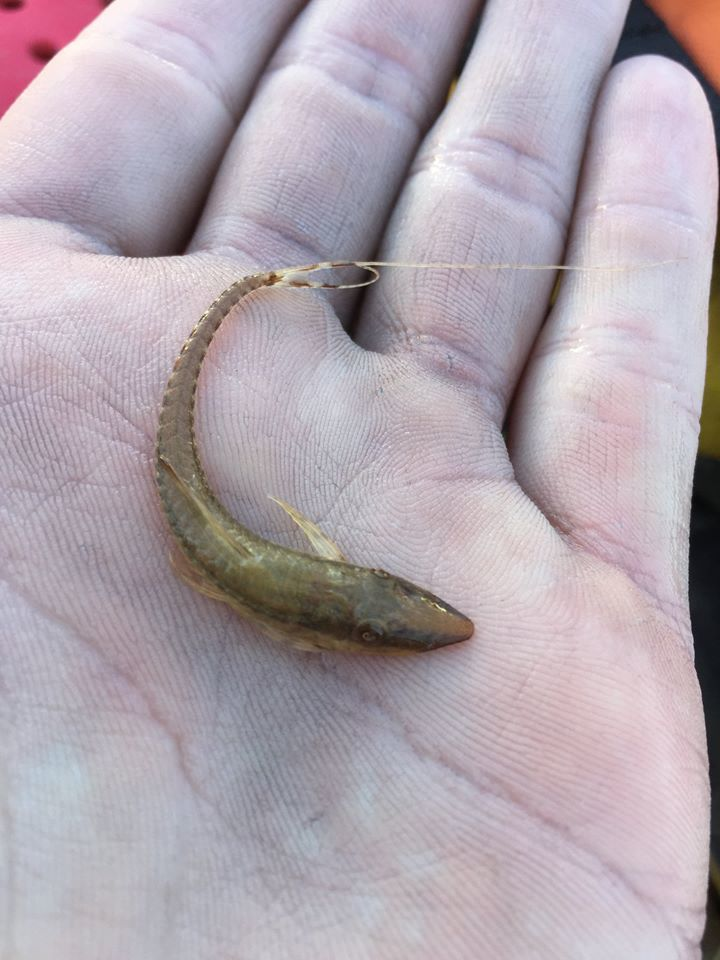

Conservation status
- Least Concern (IUCN 3.1)

Scientific classification
- Kingdom: Animalia
- Phylum: Chordata
- Class: Actinopterygii
- Order: Siluriformes
- Family: Loricariidae
- Genus: Sturisoma
- Species: S. barbatum

Binomial name
- Sturisoma barbatum (Kner, 1853)

Synonyms
- Loricaria barbata Kner, 1853; Oxyloricaria robusta Regan, 1904; Sturisoma robustum (Regan, 1904)

= Sturisoma barbatum =

Species of fish

Sturisoma barbatum is a species of freshwater ray-finned fish belonging to the family Loricariidae, the suckermouth armored catfishes, and the subfamily Loricariinae, the mailed catfishes. This catfish occurs in the Paraguay River and middle Paraná River basins in Argentina, Bolivia, Brazil and Paraguay. This species grows to a length of a standard length of 28 cm (11 in) and is believed to be a facultative air breather.
