= Maquiné =

Municipality of Rio Grande do Sul, Brazil

- Municipality
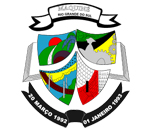
- Flag Coat of arms

- Location within Rio Grande do Sul

- Location in Brazil
- Coordinates: 29°41′38″S 50°10′48″W
- Country: Brazil
- State: Rio Grande do Sul

Population (2020)
  - Total: 6,681
- Time zone: UTC−3 (BRT)

Maquiné is a municipality in the state of Rio Grande do Sul, Brazil.

== History ==
For centuries the region of the municipality has been occupied by indigenous people of the Tupi ethnic group. The imperial government of Brazil in the 19th century encouraged European immigration, which led to conflicts and a land struggle between natives and immigrants.

The first descendants of Europeans were grandchildren of Azoreans who came from Santa Catarina Island to the region of Maquiné in 1816. Around 1840, the colonization of the Maquiné river valley began (where the municipality of Maquiné is now located), which begins in Aparados da Serra and flows into Lagoa dos Quadros. There then settled Mr. Antônio Leonardo Alves, from Desterro (Florianópolis), followed by the Abreu family. There they began to grow sugar cane and produce brandy. The locality was called Fazenda do Leonardo and occupied the region where the urban agglomeration of Maquiné is located today.

Between 1870 and 1891 Maquiné received a large wave of immigrants, predominantly Germans, Italians and Poles. With a boost of agricultural production, the transport of products was done by ferry down the Maquiné River to consumers on Osório and Torres. With troops of mules, trade was carried out with the cities of Taquara, Caxias do Sul and Porto Alegre. European immigrants basically dedicated themselves to subsistence agriculture, growing maize, wheat, beans and rice. At that time, Fazenda and the district of Marquês do Herval (currently Barra do Ouro) belonged to and were administered by the municipality of Osório. Italian immigrants were from the provinces of Venice, Monteza, Belluno and Treviso.

The settlers went to 15 de Novembro lines (today Serrito), the Encantada Line, the Sete de Setembro Line, the 14 de Julho Line and the Cachoeira Line. In 1904, in the first official record of residents of the Vale of the Maquiné river, 142 families were found, between the slopes of Serra do Mar, in the district of Marquês do Herval, in the locality known today as Cerrito and close to Lagoa da Pinguela, in the district of Morro Alto. Before that, in 1890, the Marquês do Herval Colony was created, with its headquarters in Barra do Ouro. The first settlers to arrive were the Russians, coming from Poland (at that time, still a province of Russia). About 900 immigrants did not receive their plots of land, because they decided not to remain in the region. However, some families stayed and started to produce in these colonies.

With the increase in sugarcane production on the coast, the black population immigrated to the region through the slave trade. In the district of Morro Alto, a quilombola community was formed that resists and persists in the place until the present day.

Around 1900, the first church was built, in an ecumenical effort, when the population already wanted the creation of the district, because at the time the locality was part of the district of Marquês do Herval (currently Barra do Ouro). Finally, in 1913 the district (fourth district) was created, belonging to the then municipality of Conceição do Arroio (currently Osório), and its first sub-intendent was Mr. Lindolfo Gomes de Almeida. At the same time, the district registry was created. The clerks were Anselmo Gomes de Almeida, Cristóvão Schmitt and Alberto Pedro Schimidt. The first justices of the peace were José Fernando da Silva and Manoel Aguiar.

A resident, Jacob Hab, had set up a rudimentary plant that provided electricity to the population. When his "engine" broke down, Mr. João Vidor installed a powerful boiler that operated a mill, a peeler and a sawmill during the day and generated electricity at night. There were already small industries in the locality: broom, window frames, furniture, beverages, potteries, cellars, etc

In 1914, with the construction of a small port at "Fazenda do Leonardo", the town was renamed "Porto Cachoeira". There was a period of opening of roads and in 1927 the DEPRC navigation service was installed. In 1929, the current Igreja Matriz was built and the following year, the Grupo Escolar (scholar group, current E. E. Lourenço Leon Von Langendonck) was built.

In 1938 the locality was called "Vila General Daltro Filho", a name that generated political tensions, so that two years later it was renamed "Maquiné", a name that it maintains until today. In 1947 there was a major navigation accident, resulting in the death of 18 people, including deputy Osvaldo Bastos.

== See also ==
- List of municipalities in Rio Grande do Sul
