= Psilichthys =

Psilichthys Temporal range: Lower Cretaceous Aptian–Albian

Scientific classification
- Kingdom: Animalia
- Phylum: Chordata
- Class: Actinopterygii
- Family: †Coccolepidae
- Genus: †Psilichthys; Hall, 1900

Type species
- †Psilichthys selwyni Hall, 1900

Extinct genus of fishes

Psilichthys is an extinct genus of prehistoric bony fish from Eumeralla Formation, the Lower Cretaceous epoch of what is now Victoria, Australia, known from single species P. selwyni. This is the first Mesozoic fossil vertebrate named from Victoria.

== Classification ==
Due to the only known fossil of Psilichthys is incomplete holotype specimen, its classification is discussed for years. It was originally described as a possibly palaeoniscid or chondrosteid. It has also previously been referred to the family Birgeriidae. Waldman (1971) denied interpretation as chondrosteid, considering the character that lacked scales which used to classify it as acipenseriform, is misidentification and it preserved some of scales. Waldman suggested that is likely to be a palaeoniscid that belongs to Coccolepidae, although due to preservation it is tentative. It is not belong to birgeriid considering differences from Birgeria. However, if identification as acipenseriform is true, it would be the only member of that group known from the Southern Hemisphere.

== See also ==
- Prehistoric fish
- List of prehistoric bony fish
