= Delturinae =

Scientific classification
- Kingdom: Animalia
- Phylum: Chordata
- Class: Actinopterygii
- Order: Siluriformes
- Family: Loricariidae
- Subfamily: Delturinae; Reis, E. H. L. Pereira & Armbruster, 2006

Genera
- see text

Subfamily of fishes

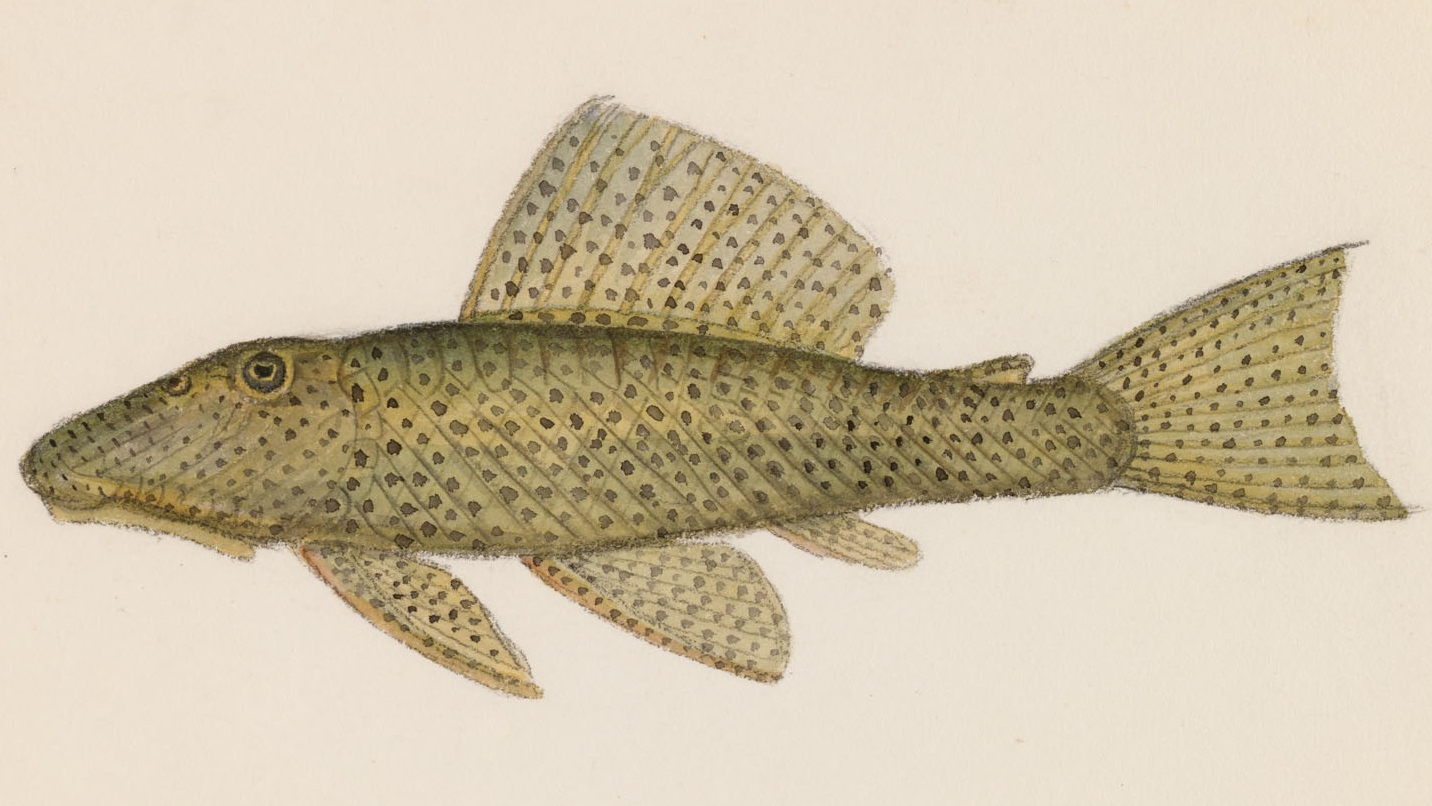
Delturus parahybae

Delturinae is a subfamily of freshwater ray-finned fishes belonging to the family Loricariidae, the armored suckermouth catfishes including two genera, Delturus and Hemipsilichthys, these are collectively known as the primitive suckermouth catfishes. This group is sister to all other loricariids except Lithogenes. The geographical distribution of Delturinae, exclusively on the southeastern Brazilian Shield, indicates southeastern Brazil acts as either a refugium for basal loricariid taxa or a point of origin for the Loricariidae.

Both genera can be separated from all other loricariids by the presence of a postdorsal ridge made up of raised, median, unpaired plates and the presence of an adipose fin membrane. Hemipsilichthys can be separated from Delturus by not having the anterior plates of the ridge contacting the lateral plates (juveniles of Delturus also have this condition) and by having a rectangular (vs. V-shaped) spinelet.

== Genera ==
Delturinae contains the following genera:

- Delturus C. H. Eigenmann & R. S. Eigenmann 1889
- Hemipsilichthys C. H. Eigenmann & R. S. Eigenmann, 1889
