= Cleithrum =

Bone in fish below the pectoral fin

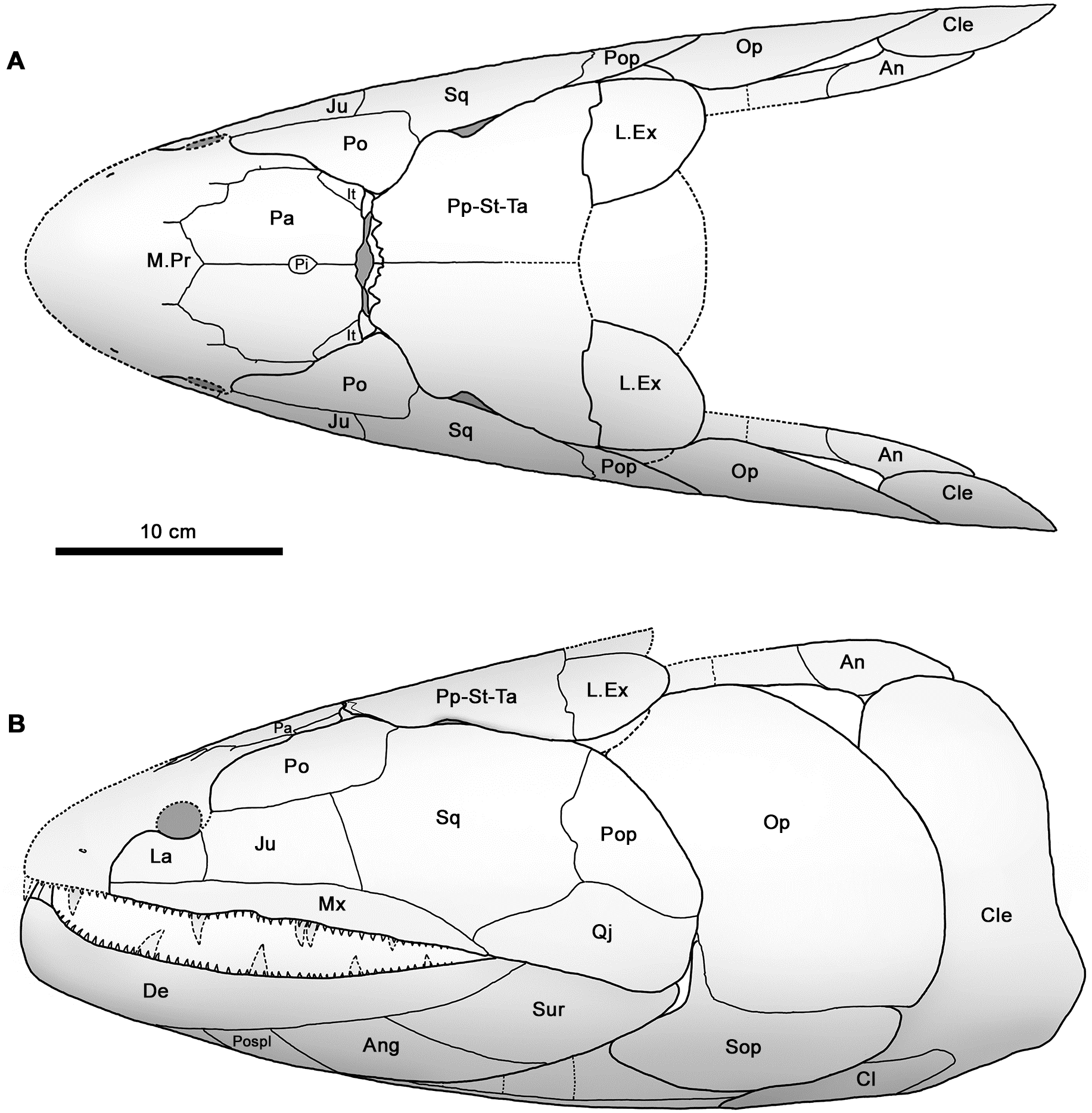
Skull of Hyneria. The cleithrum is labeled Cle.

The cleithrum (pl.: cleithra) is a paired membrane bone which first appears as part of the skeleton in primitive bony fish, where it runs vertically along the scapula. Its name is derived from Greek κλειθρον = "key (lock)", by analogy with "clavicle" from Latin clavicula = "little key".

== Anatomy ==
The cleithrum forms a part of the shoulder girdle. Unlike most bones of the shoulder, but like the clavicle and interclavicle, it develops as dermal bone. It articulates with the clavicle on its ventral side.

In fishes, where it attaches to the rear part of the skull, it articulates anteriorly with the bones of the operculum. It also articulates with the similarly-named postcleithrum (also known as the anocleithrum), supracleithrum, and presupracleithrum.

== Evolution ==
Ancestrally the cleithrum formed a part of the dermatocranium of the skull, and was attached to the rear part of the head in fishes. It is believed to have evolved from a number of bony plates present in placoderms (namely, the anterior lateral plate, the anterior ventrolateral plate, and the spinal plate).

In modern fishes, the cleithrum is a large bone that extends upwards from the base of the pectoral fin and anchors to the cranium above the gills, forming the posterior edge of the gill chamber. The bone has scientific use as a means to determine the age of fishes.

The lobe-finned fishes share this arrangement. In the earliest tetrapods, however, the cleithrum/clavicle complex came free of the skull roof, allowing for a movable neck. A small cleithrum is present in Triadobatrachus (the earliest known lissamphibian) and in modern frogs, where it forms a vestigial portion of the shoulder girdle attached to the suprascapula.

The cleithrum disappeared early in the evolution of reptiles, and in amniotes is very small or absent. It has been argued based on position, muscle connectivity, and developmental origin that the nuchal element of the turtle carapace is formed from fused cleithra.

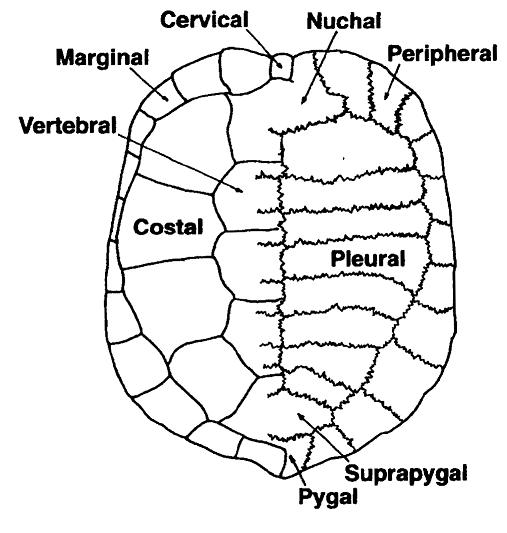
Schematic illustration of turtle carapace, showing osteology on right. The nuchal bone is a proposed homolog of the cleithra.

== See also ==
- Age determination in fish
