= Hemipsilichthys =

Scientific classification
- Kingdom: Animalia
- Phylum: Chordata
- Class: Actinopterygii
- Order: Siluriformes
- Family: Loricariidae
- Subfamily: Delturinae
- Genus: Hemipsilichthys; C. H. Eigenmann & Eigenmann, 1889

Type species
- Xenomystus gobio Lütken, 1874

Synonyms
- Upsilodus A. Miranda-Ribeiro, 1924; Xenomystus Lütken, 1874

Genus of fishes

Hemipsilichthys is a genus of freshwater ray-finned fishes belonging to the family Loricariidae, the armoured suckermouth catfishes, and the subfamily Delturinae, the primitive suckermouth catfishes. These wide-mouthed freshwater catfishes are restricted to southeast Brazil in the Paraíba do Sul, Perequê-Áçu and Taquari river basins. Hemipsilichthys, along with Delturus, form a clade (Delturinae). In these two genera, members have a ridge behind their dorsal fin and an adipose fin membrane. However, in Hemipsilichthys, the dorsal fin membrane and most anterior plate of the adipose fin do not touch, while they do in Delturus.

== Species ==
Hemipsilichthys contains the following valid species:

- Hemipsilichthys gobio (Lütken, 1874)
- Hemipsilichthys nimius Pereira, Reis, Souza & Lazzarotto, 2003
- Hemipsilichthys papillatus Pereira, Oliveira & Oyakawa, 2000
