= Roberto Esser dos Reis =

Brazilian ichthyologist

Roberto Esser dos Reis is a Brazilian ichthyologist, professor and Curator of Fishes at the Pontifical Catholic University of Rio Grande do Sul. Among other duties, Reis has been working at the University of São Paulo, Brazil, the University of Michigan, Ann Arbor, and the University of Central Florida, Orlando, Florida, United States. Most of his research as an ichthyologist regards different types of South American catfish. He is also chair for South America of the Freshwater Fish Specialist Group, Species Survival Commission, and advises the IUCN on the biological aspects of the conservation of threatened species.

Reis authored more than 120 original journal papers, and four books. Reis is Chief Editor of the Checklist of Freshwater Fishes from Central and South America (CLOFFSCA), and past President of the Brazilian Ichthyological Society. Reis has discovered and described more than 100 fish species.

== Taxon described by him ==
- See Category:Taxa named by Roberto Esser dos Reis

== Taxon named in his honor ==
- Sturisoma reisi is a species of catfish in the family Loricariidae.
- Phalloceros reisi, the Apiaí toothcarp, is a species of poeciliid fish native to Brazil.
