= Odontode =

Dermal teeth found in some fish species

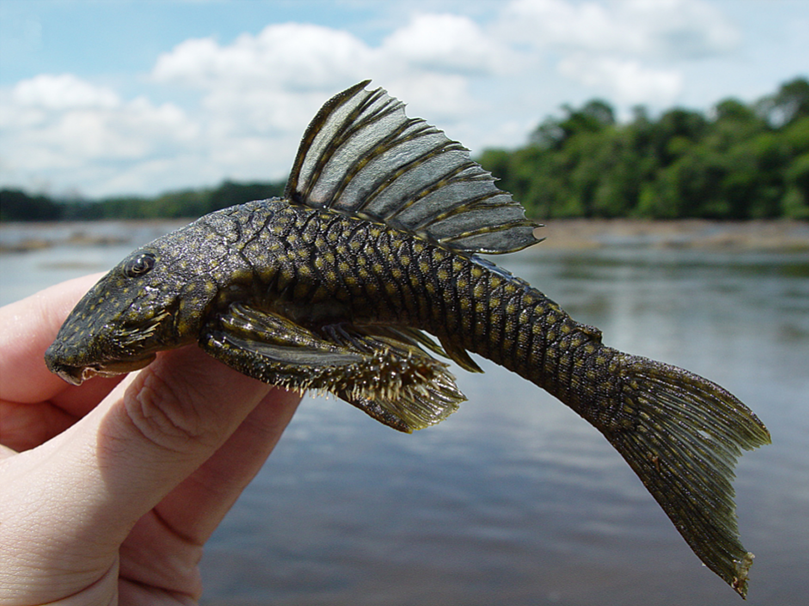
The frill-like odontodes on a suckermouth catfish’s pectoral fins

Odontodes, or dermal teeth, are hard structures found on the external surfaces of animals or near internal openings. They consist of a soft pulp cavity surrounded by dentine and covered by a mineralised substance such as enamel, a structure similar to that of teeth. They generally do not have the same function as teeth, and are not replaced the same way teeth are in most fish. In some animals (notably catfish), the presence or size of odontodes can be used in determining the sex.

Odontodes typically cover the body of chondrichthyans (cartilaginous fishes), while mineralized dermal scales are characteristic of bony fishes. During the evolution to bony fishes, ancestral odontodes have been modified to become dermal scales, including elasmoid scales in teleosteans.

== Etymology ==
The name comes from the Greek "odous, gen. odontos" meaning tooth.

== Images ==
Aquino et al. (2001) show scanning electron microscope images of odontodes on a catfish.

== See also ==
- Dermal denticle
