= Ancistrus yutajae =

Conservation status
- Endangered (IUCN 3.1)

Scientific classification
- Kingdom: Animalia
- Phylum: Chordata
- Class: Actinopterygii
- Order: Siluriformes
- Family: Loricariidae
- Genus: Ancistrus
- Species: A. yutajae

Binomial name
- Ancistrus yutajae de Souza, Taphorn & Armbruster, 2019

Species of catfish

Ancistrus yutajae is a species of freshwater ray-finned fish belonging to the family Loricariidae, the suckermouth armoured catfishes, and the subfamily Hypostominae, the suckermouth catfishes. This catfish is endemic to Venezuela.

== Taxonomy ==
Ancistrus yutajae was first formally described in 2019 by the ichthyologists Lesley S. de Souza, Donald Charles Taphorn Baechle and Jonathan W. Armbruster, with its type locality given as the Yutajé River at the end of the airstrip at Campamento Yutajé, Orinoco/Ventuari/Yutajé River, Amazonas in Venezuela, at 6.146078°, -61.492243°. Eschmeyer's Catalog of Fishes classifies the genus Ancistrus in the subfamily Hypostominae, the suckermouth catfishes, within the suckermouth armored catfish family Loricariidae. It has also been classified in the tribe Ancistrini by some authorities.

== Etymology ==
Ancistrus yutajae is classified in the genus Ancistrus, a name coined by Rudolf Kner, but when he proposed the genus he did not explain the etymology of the name. It is thought to be from the Greek ágkistron, meaning a "fish hook" or the "hook of a spindle", a reference to the hooked odontodes on the interopercular bone. The specific name, yutajae, means of the Yutajé, the type locality, and a reference to a local legend about young lovers named Yu and Tajé, whose tribes were at war with each other; in an attempt to escape capture, they leapt off a cliff and were transformed into twin waterfalls, which are now intermingled to create the Yutajé Falls and River, by the god of waters. They will one day regain their humanity when their peoples unite to form a single nation and peacefully live in the Guiana Shield region.

== Description ==
Ancistrus yutajae can be told apart from other Guianan shield Ancistrusspecies, in the tentacles on the snout being unforked and in having a rectangular naked patch behingd the tentacles, exrtending to the front edge of the nostrils. The anal fin has three, rather than four, branched fin rays. Ancistrus species develop soft, bushy tentacles on the snout when sexually mature, these are better developed in the males than they are in females. This catfish reaches a standard length of 8.3 cm (3.3 in).

== Distribution ==
Ancistrus yutajae is endemic to Venezuela where it is restricted to the Yutajé River, a tributary of the Ventuari River, in the Orinoco drainage system in Amazonas. It lives in rapids with a fast current.

== Conservation status ==
Ancistrus yutajae is classified as Endangered by the IUCN because it has a highly restricted range, being known only from the type locality. This locality is, however, very remote and further exploration is needed.
