= Rhinodoras =

Rhinodoras Temporal range: Late Miocene - Recent

Scientific classification
- Domain: Eukaryota
- Kingdom: Animalia
- Phylum: Chordata
- Class: Actinopterygii
- Order: Siluriformes
- Family: Doradidae
- Subfamily: Doradinae
- Genus: Rhinodoras; Bleeker, 1862

Type species
- Doras (Oxydoras) dorbignyi Kner, 1855

Genus of fishes

Rhinodoras is a genus of thorny catfishes native to South America.

== Species ==
There are currently five recognized species in this genus:

- Rhinodoras armbrusteri Sabaj Pérez, 2008
- Rhinodoras boehlkei Glodek, Whitmire & Orcés-V. (es), 1976
- Rhinodoras dorbignyi (Kner, 1855)
- Rhinodoras gallagheri Sabaj Pérez, Taphorn & Castillo G., 2008
- Rhinodoras thomersoni Taphorn & Lilyestrom, 1984

== Fossil record ==
Rhinodoras has been identified in the fossil record from the late Miocene Urumaco Formation (about 9 million years of age), Falcón State, Venezuela. R. thomersoni may have a minimum age of 8 million years.

== Appearance and anatomy ==
Rhinodoras species are distinguished from other doradids by a unique combination of coloration (sides darkly mottled, usually with wide dark bars, light mid-lateral stripe absent) and lip shape (labial tissue thick, fleshy, considerably expanded at corners of mouth forming rounded flap-like extensions with entire margins, all surfaces rugose with low, rounded, and tightly spaced papillae, and distal margin of lower lip draped over bases of outer and inner jaw barbels, at times nearly encircling the latter).
