= Ancistrus kellerae =

Conservation status
- Vulnerable (IUCN 3.1)

Scientific classification
- Kingdom: Animalia
- Phylum: Chordata
- Class: Actinopterygii
- Order: Siluriformes
- Family: Loricariidae
- Genus: Ancistrus
- Species: A. kellerae

Binomial name
- Ancistrus kellerae de Souza, Taphorn & Armbruster, 2019

Species of fish

Ancistrus kellerae is a species of freshwater ray-finned fish belonging to the family Loricariidae, the suckermouth armoured catfishes, and the subfamily Hypostominae, the suckermouth catfishes. This catfish is endemic to Guyana.

== Taxonomy ==
Ancistrus kellerae was first formally described in 2016 by the ichthyologists Lesley S. de Souza, Donald Charles Taphorn Baechle and Jonathan W. Armbruster, with its type locality given as the Kuribrong River, in rapids at Grass Shoals, Potaro River drainage, Region 8 Potaro-Siparuni, Guyana, at 5.40791°, -59.53179°. Eschmeyer's Catalog of Fishes classified the genus Ancistrus in the subfamily Hypostominae, the suckermouth catfishes, within the suckermouth armored catfish family Loricariidae. It has also been classified in the tribe Ancistrini by some authorities.

== Etymology ==
Ancistrus kellerae is classified in the genus Ancistrus, a name coined by Rudolf Kner, but when he proposed the genus he did not explain the etymology of the name. It is thought to be from the Greek ágkistron, meaning a "fish hook" or the "hook of a spindle", a reference to the hooked odontodes on the interopercular bone. The specific name, kellerae, honours Constance Templeton Keller, the Chair of the Board of Trustees for the Field Museum of Natural History in Chicago, in recognition of her support for research in and conservation of Neotropical forests and rivers and for the mutual love she and de Souza have for fly fishing, the outdoors and conservation.

== Description ==
Ancistrus kellerae can be told apart from other Guianan shield Ancistrusspecies, other than A. patronus by the possession of a triangular shaped area of naked skin to the rear of the middle row of tentaccles, this patch extends to the front edge of the nostrils, in A. patronus this patch is rectangular. There is a small plate enclosed by skin between the nostrils and the rera odontodes, short dentaries and there is a wide gold margin at the end of the caudal fin. There are gold spots on the head with none on the body, a dark stripe along the lateral line, a darker back and indistinct dark spots on the spine of the pectoral fin. Ancistrus species develop soft, bushy tentacles on the snout when sexually mature, these are better developed in the males than they are in females. This catfish reaches a standard length of 5.5 cm (2.2 in).

== Distribution ==
Ancistrus kellerae is endemic to Guyana where it occurs in the Kuribrong River, downstream to Amaila Falls, and in the Potaro River, in the Essequibo River basin. It is a nocturanl species that lives in rapids.

== Conservation status ==
Ancistrus kellerae is endemic to a relatively small are and is known from a few locations. The region where this catfish is found is subjected to intense pressure from gold and diamond mining and this species shows a preference fotr clear water and mining activities increase the sedimentin the water column, degrading habitat for fishes that require clear water. The International Union for Conservation of Nature has classified A. kellerae as Vulnerable.
