= Ancistrus vericaucanus =

Conservation status
- Endangered (IUCN 3.1)

Scientific classification
- Kingdom: Animalia
- Phylum: Chordata
- Class: Actinopterygii
- Order: Siluriformes
- Family: Loricariidae
- Genus: Ancistrus
- Species: A. vericaucanus

Binomial name
- Ancistrus vericaucanus Taphorn, Armbruster, Villa-Navarro & Ray, 2013

Species of catfish

Ancistrus vericaucanus is a species of freshwater ray-finned fish belonging to the family Loricariidae, the suckermouth armoured catfishes, and the subfamily Hypostominae, the suckermouth catfishes. This catfish is endemic to Colombia.

== Taxonomy ==
Ancistrus vericaucanus was first formally described in 2013 by the ichthyologists Donald Charles Taphorn Baechle, Janoathan W. Armbruster, Francisco Antonio Villa-Navarro and C. Keith Ray with its type locality given as the Finca Santa Barbara, La Vieja River, in the Cauca River drainage in Valle del Cauca Department, Colombia, from an elevation of 1,278 m (4,193 ft) a.s.l. Eschmeyer's Catalog of Fishes classifies the genus Ancistrus in the subfamily Hypostominae, the suckermouth catfishes, within the suckermouth armored catfish family Loricariidae. It has also been classified in the tribe Ancistrini by some authorities.

== Etymology ==
Ancistrus vericaucanus is classified in the genus Ancistrus, a name coined by Rudolf Kner, but when he proposed the genus he did not explain the etymology of the name. It is thought to be from the Greek ágkistron, meaning a "fish hook" or the "hook of a spindle", a reference to the hooked odontodes on the interopercular bone. The specific name, vericaucanus, prefixies veri, derived from verus, which means "true", onto caucanus, a reference to A. caucanus which was incorrectly thought to be from the Cauca River. A caucanus is found in the Meta River and this species is the "true" Cauca species.

== Description ==
Ancistrus vericaucanus reaches a standard length of 7.2 cm (2.8 in). Ancistrus species develop soft, bushy tentacles on the snout when sexually mature, these are better developed in the males than they are in females.

== Distribution ==
Ancistrus vericaucanus is endemic to Colombia where it is only known from three localities in the upper Cauca River basin in the departments of Valle del Cauca and Quindío.

== Conservation status ==
Ancistrus vericaucanus is classified as Endangered by the International Union for Conservation of Nature because it is restricted distribution and is known from just three localities in the Upper Cauca Basin where it is threatened by pollution from agriculture and urban waste.
