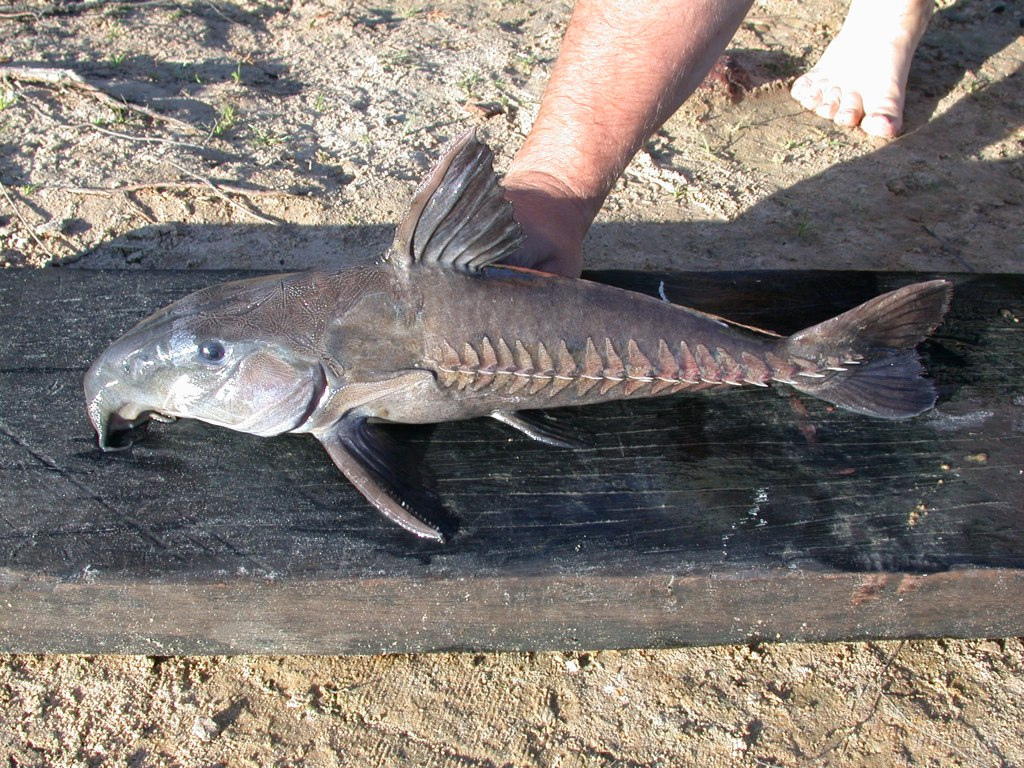
- Oxydoras niger

Scientific classification
- Domain: Eukaryota
- Kingdom: Animalia
- Phylum: Chordata
- Class: Actinopterygii
- Order: Siluriformes
- Family: Doradidae
- Subfamily: Doradinae
- Genus: Oxydoras; Kner, 1855

Type species
- Oxydoras kneri Bleeker, 1863

Synonyms
- Pseudodoras Bleeker, 1858; Hildadoras Fernández-Yépez, 1968

= Oxydoras =

Genus of fishes

Oxydoras is a genus of thorny catfishes native to tropical South America.

== Species ==
There are currently three recognized species in this genus:

- Oxydoras kneri Bleeker, 1862
- Oxydoras niger (Valenciennes, 1821) (Ripsaw catfish)
- Oxydoras sifontesi Fernández-Yépez, 1968

== Description ==
Oxydoras species are relatively large, reaching between 70–100 centimetres (28–40 in) in length. O. kneri has a maximum published weight of 9 kilograms (20 lb). O. niger gets even heavier, with a maximum published weight of 13 kilograms (29 lb).
