= Patronus =

Patronus may refer to:

- Patron in latin, such as in patronage in ancient Rome
- the apparition produced by the Patronus Charm in Harry Potter
- Ancistrus patronus, a catfish
- Gulf menhaden (Brevoortia patronus), a shad
- Banque Patronus Limitée, a bank in Mauritius
