= Ancistrus tolima =

Conservation status
- Endangered (IUCN 3.1)

Scientific classification
- Kingdom: Animalia
- Phylum: Chordata
- Class: Actinopterygii
- Order: Siluriformes
- Family: Loricariidae
- Genus: Ancistrus
- Species: A. tolima

Binomial name
- Ancistrus tolima Taphorn, Armbruster, Villa-Navarro & Ray, 2013

Species of catfish

Ancistrus tolima is a species of freshwater ray-finned fish belonging to the family Loricariidae, the suckermouth armoured catfishes, and the subfamily Hypostominae, the suckermouth catfishes. This catfish is endemic to Colombia.

== Taxonomy ==
Ancistrus tolima was first formally described in 2013 by the ichthyologists Donald Charles Taphorn Baechle, Janoathan W. Armbruster, Francisco Antonio Villa-Navarro and C. Keith Ray with its type locality given as the Quebrada El Pascado, San Pablo route, Dolores, Tolima, Colombia, at 3.599306°N, -74.854556°W. Eschmeyer's Catalog of Fishes classifies the genus Ancistrus in the subfamily Hypostominae, the suckermouth catfishes, within the suckermouth armored catfish family Loricariidae. It has also been classified in the tribe Ancistrini by some authorities.

== Etymology ==
Ancistrus tolima is classified in the genus Ancistrus, a name coined by Rudolf Kner, but when he proposed the genus he did not explain the etymology of the name. It is thought to be from the Greek ágkistron, meaning a "fish hook" or the "hook of a spindle", a reference to the hooked odontodes on the interopercular bone. The specific name, tolima, is based on the name of a Pijao princess Yulima, who the Spanish conquistadores had burned at the stake and martyred, the Colombian Department of Tolima, where type locality is located, was named after her.

== Description ==
Ancistrus tolima reaches a standard length of 7.7 cm (3.0 in). Ancistrus species develop soft, bushy tentacles on the snout when sexually mature, these are better developed in the males than they are in females.

== Distribution ==
Ancistrus tolima is endemic to Colombia where it is only known from its type locality of the Quebrada El Pescado, Vereda San Pablo, in the Upper Magdalena River drainage, Pardo River sub-basin, Municipality of Dolores, Tolima Department, Colombia. This catfish is found between 1,100 and 1,300 m (3,600 and 4,300 ft).

== Conservation status ==
Ancistrus tolima is classified as Endangered by the International Union for Conservation of Nature because it is restricted to a single stream where it is isolated by a dam, this creek is subject to agricultural modification and is sensitive to climate change.
