= Neblinichthys =

Scientific classification
- Kingdom: Animalia
- Phylum: Chordata
- Class: Actinopterygii
- Division: Teleostei
- Order: Siluriformes
- Family: Loricariidae
- Subfamily: Hypostominae
- Genus: Neblinichthys; Ferraris, Isbrücker & Nijssen, 1986

Type species
- Neblinichthys pilosus Ferraris, Isbrücker & Nijssen, 1986

Genus of fishes

Neblinichthys is a genus of freshwater ray-finned fishes belonging to the family Loricariidae, the suckermouth armoured catfishes, and the subfamily Hypostominae, the suckermouth catfishes. The catfishes in this genus are found in South America.

== Taxonomy ==
Neblinichthys was first proposed as a monospecific genus in 1986 by Carl J. Ferraris Jr., Isaäc J. H. Isbrücker and Han Nijssen when they described Neblinichthys pilosus, which they also designated as the type species of the new genus. The type locality of N. pilosus was given as a Río Mawarinuma tributary, at the Neblina base camp, on the right bank in a riffle, at 0°55'N, 66°10'W, from an elevation of 120 m (390 ft). Some authorities regard this genus as being within the tribe Ancistrini of the subfamily Hypostominae, but Eschmeyer's Catalog of Fishes does not recognise tribes within the subfamily Hypostominae.

== Etymology ==
Neblinichthys adds the suffix -ichthys, meaning "fish" onto Neblina, the type locality of its type species, a camp on the Rio Mawarinuma.

== Species ==
Neblinichthys contains the following valid species

- Neblinichthys brevibracchium Taphorn, Armbruster, López-Fernández & Bernard, 2010
- Neblinichthys echinasus Taphorn, Armbruster, López-Fernández & Bernard, 2010
- Neblinichthys peniculatus Armbruster & Taphorn, 2013
- Neblinichthys pilosus Ferraris, Isbrücker & Nijssen, 1986
- Neblinichthys roraima Provenzano R., Lasso A. & Ponte, 1995
- Neblinichthys yaravi (Steindachner, 1915)

== Appearance and anatomy ==
Neblinichthys species are unique in that the breeding males have a snout brush formed by elongate, bristle-like odontodes pointing forwards on the snout. More fairly elongated odontodes are found on the top of the head and on the body. Otherwise they appear rather similar to Lasiancistrus species. Females and juveniles may be differentiated from Lasiancistrus species by the lack of cheek whiskers. Neblinichthys species also have their pectoral fin and pelvic fin spines the same length.

== Distribution and habitat ==
Neblinichthys catfishes are found in rivers draining off the Guiana Shield in Venezuela and Guyana. They occur at mid-altitude locations, and are possibly restricted to streams along the sides of tepuis and other granite outcrops.
