= Rhinodoras dorbignyi =

Conservation status
- Least Concern (IUCN 3.1)

Scientific classification
- Kingdom: Animalia
- Phylum: Chordata
- Class: Actinopterygii
- Order: Siluriformes
- Family: Doradidae
- Genus: Rhinodoras
- Species: R. dorbignyi

Binomial name
- Rhinodoras dorbignyi (Kner, 1855)

Synonyms
- Doras dorbignyi Kner, 1855; Doras nebulosus C. H. Eigenmann & Kennedy, 1903

Species of fish

Rhinodoras dorbignyi is a species of thorny catfish found in the Paraná River basin in the countries of Argentina, Bolivia, Brazil, Paraguay and Uruguay. This species grows to a length of 50 centimetres (20 in) TL.

== Etymology ==
Named after Alcide Charles Victor Marie Dessalines d'Orbigny.
