= Ancistrus leoni =

Conservation status
- Least Concern (IUCN 3.1)

Scientific classification
- Kingdom: Animalia
- Phylum: Chordata
- Class: Actinopterygii
- Order: Siluriformes
- Family: Loricariidae
- Genus: Ancistrus
- Species: A. leoni

Binomial name
- Ancistrus leoni de Souza, Taphorn & Armbruster, 2019

Species of catfish

Ancistrus leoni is a species of freshwater ray-finned fish belonging to the family Loricariidae, the suckermouth armoured catfishes, and the subfamily Hypostominae, the suckermouth catfishes. This catfish is found in Brazil, Colombia and Venezuela.

== Taxonomy ==
Ancistrus leoni was first formally described in 2019 by the ichthyologists Lesley S. de Souza, Donald Charles Taphorn Baechle and Jonathan W. Armbruster, with its type locality given as the Rio Negro (Amazon), in rapids about 1 km (0.62 mi) downstream of the mouth of the Casiquiare, Atabapo District in Amazonas State, Venezuela, at 1.987611°, -67.120250°. Eschmeyer's Catalog of Fishes classified the genus Ancistrus in the subfamily Hypostominae, the suckermouth catfishes, within the suckermouth armored catfish family Loricariidae. It has also been classified in the tribe Ancistrini by some authorities.

== Etymology ==
Ancistrus leoni is classified in the genus Ancistrus, a name coined by Rudolf Kner, but when he proposed the genus he did not explain the etymology of the name. It is thought to be from the Greek ágkistron, meaning a "fish hook" or the "hook of a spindle", a reference to the hooked odontodes on the interopercular bone. The specific name, leoni, honours Oscar Leon Mata, the killifish collector and aquarist, environmental engineer and curateor of fishes at the Natural Sciences Museum in Guanare. Mata collected the type series of this species, he assisted many expeditions to Venezuela and was an important Venezuelan ichthyology. He died of bone cancer in 2018.

== Description ==
Ancistrus leoni can be told apart from other Guianan shield Ancistrusspecies, in having the odontodes along the middle of the snout arranged in one thin series. They also have small white spotes and saddle marks along the back. Its eyes are almost wholly located on the upper surface of the head, with the rim of the orbit being the highest part of the head. The breeding males of this species is the only one in its genus which has a tentacle situated in an area between the posteromedial and cheek sections. It also has a very pale underside. Ancistrus species develop soft, bushy tentacles on the snout when sexually mature, these are better developed in the males than they are in females. This catfish reaches a standard length of 8.2 cm (3.2 in).

== Distribution and habitat ==
Ancistrus leoni is found in South America where is known from the upper Río Negro and the Orinoco in the state of Amazonas in Venezuela, northernmost Brazil and most liely also in tributaries of the Río Negro in neighbouring regions of Colombia. Little is known about this species' biology and ecology but its very flattened body suggests it lives under rocks in rapids.

== Conservation status ==
Ancistrus kellerae is endemic to a relatively small are and is known from a few locations. The region where this catfish is found is subjected to intense pressure from gold and diamond mining and this species shows a preference fotr clear water and mining activities increase the sedimentin the water column, degrading habitat for fishes that require clear water. The International Union for Conservation of Nature has classified A. kellerae as Vulnerable.
