= O. niger =

O. niger may refer to:

- Odonus niger, the redtoothed triggerfish or Niger trigger, a fish species of the tropical Indo-Pacific area
- Oxydoras niger, the ripsaw catfish, a fish species

== See also ==
- Niger (disambiguation)
