= Ancistrus falconensis =

Scientific classification
- Kingdom: Animalia
- Phylum: Chordata
- Class: Actinopterygii
- Order: Siluriformes
- Family: Loricariidae
- Genus: Ancistrus
- Species: A. falconensis

Binomial name
- Ancistrus falconensis Taphorn, Armbruster & Rodríguez-Olarte, 2010

Species of catfish

Ancistrus falconensis is a species of freshwater ray-finned fish belonging to the family Loricariidae, the suckermouth armoured catfishes, and the subfamily Hypostominae, the suckermouth catfishes. This catfish is endemic to Venezuela.

== Taxonomy ==
Ancistrus falconensis was first formally described in 2010 by the American ichthyologists Donald Charles Taphorn Baechle and Jonathan W. Armbruster, and the Venezuelan ichtyologist and ecologist Douglas Rodríguez-Olarte, with its type locality given as the Hueque River at 11°09'41.4"N, 69°33'24.9" W, at the bridge on the highway from Churuguara to Coro in the state of Falcón. Eschmeyer's Catalog of Fishes classified the genus Ancistrus in the subfamily Hypostominae, the suckermouth catfishes, within the suckermouth armored catfish family Loricariidae. It has also been classified in the tribe Ancistrini by some authorities.

== Etymology ==
Ancistrus falconensis is classified in the genus Ancistrus, a name coined by Rudolf Kner when he proposed the genus but Kner did not explain the etymology of the name. It is thought to be from the Greek ágkistron, meaning a "fish hook" or the "hook of a spindle", a reference to the hooked odontodes on the interopercular bone. The specific name, falconensis, suffixes -ensis, meaning "of a place", onto Falcón, the state the type locality is located in.

== Description ==
Ancistrus falconensis reaches a standard length of 9.3 cm (3.7 in). Ancistrus species develop soft, bushy tentacles on the snout when sexually mature, these are better developed in the males than they are in females.

== Distribution and habitat ==
Ancistrus falconensis is endemic to Venezuela where it occurs only in the state of Falcón, in the Hueque and Ricoa River drainages. This catfish is found in clear highland streams with rocky streambeds.
