= Ancistrus amaris =

Conservation status
- Near Threatened (IUCN 3.1)

Scientific classification
- Kingdom: Animalia
- Phylum: Chordata
- Class: Actinopterygii
- Order: Siluriformes
- Family: Loricariidae
- Genus: Ancistrus
- Species: A. amaris

Binomial name
- Ancistrus amaris de Souza, Taphorn & Armbruster, 2019

Species of freshwater fish

Ancistrus amaris is a species of freshwater ray-finned fish belonging to the family Loricariidae, the suckermouth armoured catfishes, and the subfamily Hypostominae, the suckermouth catfishes. This catfish is endemic to Venezuela.

== Taxonomy ==
Ancistrus amaris was first formally described in 2019 by the ichthyologists Lesley S. de Souza, Donald Charles Taphorn Baechle and Jonathan W. Armbruster with its type locality given as the Las Marias River, in the Orinoco/Apure drainage, Portuguesa, Venezuela, at 9.402778°, -69.7375°. Eschmeyer's Catalog of Fishes classified the genus Ancistrus in the subfamily Hypostominae, the suckermouth catfishes, within the suckermouth armored catfish family Loricariidae. It has also been classified in the tribe Ancistrini by some authorities.

== Etymology ==
Ancistrus amaris is classified in the genus Ancistrus, a name coined by Rudolf Kner but when he proposed the genus Kner did not explain the etymology of the name. It is thought to be from the Greek ágkistron, meaning a "fish hook" or the "hook of a spindle", a reference to the hooked odontodes on the interopercular bone. The specific name, amaris, means "without virility" an allusion to the shorter tentacles on breeding males compared to related species in the Orinoco region.

== Description ==
Ancistrus amaris have shorter tentacles in the breeding males than related species in the same area. It also has a longer lower jaw. This species reaches a standard length of 10.3 cm (4.1 in).

== Distribution and habit ==
Ancistrus amaris is endemic to Venezuela where it is known from foothill streams of the Andes in the Orinoco and Apure drainages. It occurs in streams with fast currents, possibly faster than any related species in the same area.

== Conservation status ==
Ancistrus amaris has a restricted range, is known from a few localities and its habitat is under anthropogenic threats from deforestation, water abstraction, hydroelectric damming and pollution. The International Union for Conservation of Nature have classified this species as Near Threatened.
