= Cuiu cuiu =

Cuiu cuiu could be:

- the catfish Oxydoras niger
- the pileated parrot Pionopsitta pileata
