= Renova =

Renova may refer to:

== Cities, towns, townships etc. ==
- Renova, Mississippi
- Renova: an unincorporated settlement in Dexter Township, Mower County, Minnesota

== Brand names ==
- RENOVA, Inc. (company), a Japanese renewable energy company
- Renova (company), a Portuguese paper products company
- Trade name of tretinoin, a treatment for acne and other skin conditions
- Renova Group, a Russian holding company controlled by Viktor Vekselberg

== Other ==
- KF Renova, football club
- Renova oscari, a killifish genus
