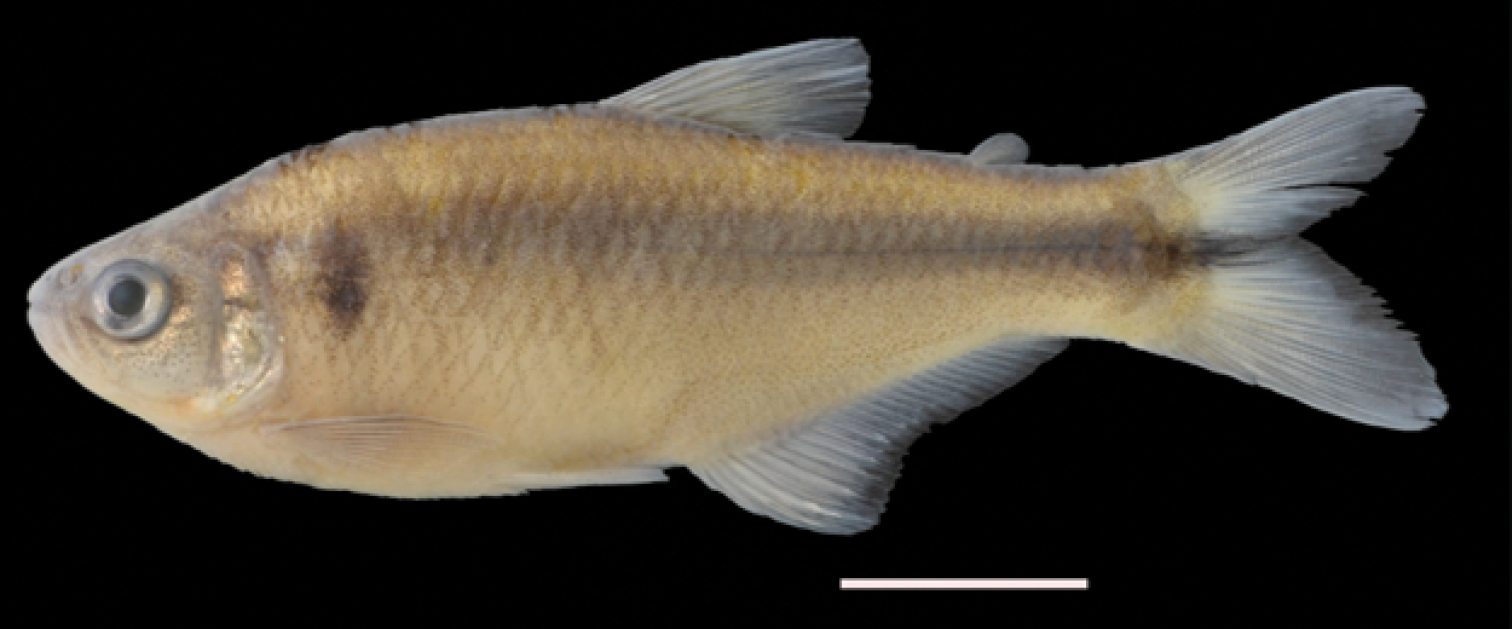
- Hemibrycon sanjuanensis

Scientific classification
- Kingdom: Animalia
- Phylum: Chordata
- Class: Actinopterygii
- Order: Characiformes
- Family: Stevardiidae
- Subfamily: Hemibryconinae
- Genus: Hemibrycon; Günther, 1864

Type species
- Tetragonopterus polyodon Günther, 1864

= Hemibrycon =

Genus of fishes

Hemibrycon is a genus of characins. They are mainly found in South America (including Trinidad), with the single exception being H. dariensis of east Panama.

== Species ==
THemibrycon contains the following valid species:

- Hemibrycon andresoi (Román-Valencia, 2003)
- Hemibrycon antioquiae Román-Valencia, Ruiz-C., Taphorn, Mancera-Rodriguez & García-Alzate, 2013
- Hemibrycon arilepis Román-Valencia, Vanegas-Ríos & Ruiz-C., 2008
- Hemibrycon beni N. E. Pearson, 1924
- Hemibrycon boquiae (C. H. Eigenmann, 1913)
- Hemibrycon brevispini Román-Valencia & Arcila-Mesa, 2009
- Hemibrycon cairoensis Román-Valencia & Arcila-Mesa, 2009
- Hemibrycon cardalensis Román-Valencia, Ruiz-C., Taphorn, Mancera-Rodriguez & García-Alzate, 2013
- Hemibrycon carrilloi Dahl, 1960
- Hemibrycon caucanus (C. H. Eigenmann, 1913)
- Hemibrycon chaparensis Ruiz-C, Román-Valencia, Bastidas & Taphorn, 2023
- Hemibrycon clausen Ardila Rodríguez, 2020
- Hemibrycon colombianus C. H. Eigenmann, 1914
- Hemibrycon convencionensis Ruiz-C, Román-Valencia, Bastidas & Taphorn, 2023
- Hemibrycon coxeyi Fowler, 1943
- Hemibrycon cristiani (Román-Valencia, 1999)
- Hemibrycon dariensis Meek & Hildebrand, 1916
- Hemibrycon decurrens (C. H. Eigenmann, 1913)
- Hemibrycon dentatus (C. H. Eigenmann]], 1913)
- Hemibrycon divisorensis Bertaco, L. R. Malabarba, Hidalgo & H. Ortega, 2007
- Hemibrycon fasciatus Román-Valencia, Ruiz-C., Taphorn, Mancera-Rodriguez & García-Alzate, 2013
- Hemibrycon foncensis (Román-Valencia, Vanegas-Ríos & Ruiz-C., 2009)
- Hemibrycon galvisi (Román-Valencia, 2000)
- Hemibrycon guejarensis (Román-Valencia, Ruiz-C. & Taphorn, 2018
- Hemibrycon guppyi (Regan, 1906)
- Hemibrycon gutierrezi Ardila Rodríguez, 2020
- Hemibrycon helleri C. H. Eigenmann, 1927
- Hemibrycon huambonicus (Steindachner, 1882)
- Hemibrycon inambari Bertaco & L. R. Malabarba, 2010
- Hemibrycon iqueima J. E. García-Melo, Albornoz‐Garzón, L. J. García‐Melo, Villa‐Navarro & Maldonado-Ocampo, 2018
- Hemibrycon jabonero L. P. Schultz, 1944
- Hemibrycon jelskii (Steindachner, 1876)
- Hemibrycon loisae (Géry, 1964)
- Hemibrycon lorethae Ruiz-C, Román-Valencia, Bastidas & Taphorn, 2023
- Hemibrycon mamorensis Ruiz-C, Román-Valencia, Bastidas & Taphorn, 2023
- Hemibrycon megantoniensis Ruiz-C, Román-Valencia, Bastidas & Taphorn, 2023
- Hemibrycon metae G. S. Myers, 1930
- Hemibrycon microformaa Román-Valencia & Ruiz-C., 2007
- Hemibrycon mikrostiktos Bertaco & L. R. Malabarba, 2010
- Hemibrycon multiradiatus (Dahl, 1960)
- Hemibrycon paez Román-Valencia & Arcila-Mesa, 2010
- Hemibrycon palomae Román-Valencia, García-Alzate, Ruiz-C. & Taphorn, 2010
- Hemibrycon pautensis Román-Valencia, Ruiz-C. & Barriga Salazar, 2006
- Hemibrycon plutarcoi (Román-Valencia, 2001)
- Hemibrycon polyodon (Günther, 1864)
- Hemibrycon quindos [Román-Valencia & Arcila-Mesa, 2010
- Hemibrycon rafaelensis Román-Valencia & Arcila-Mesa, 2008
- Hemibrycon raqueliae Román-Valencia & Arcila-Mesa, 2010
- Hemibrycon sanjuanensis Román-Valencia, Ruiz-C., Taphorn & García-Alzate, 2014
- Hemibrycon santamartae Román-Valencia, Ruiz-C., García-Alzate & Taphorn, 2010
- Hemibrycon sierraensis García-Alzate, Román-Valencia & Taphorn, 2015
- Hemibrycon surinamensis Géry, 1962
- Hemibrycon taeniurus (T. N. Gill, 1858)
- Hemibrycon tolimae (C. H. Eigenmann, 1913)
- Hemibrycon tridens C. H. Eigenmann, 1922 (Jumping tetra)
- Hemibrycon velox Dahl, 1964
- Hemibrycon virolinica Román-Valencia & Arcila-Mesa, 2010
- Hemibrycon yacopiae Román-Valencia & Arcila-Mesa, 2010
