= Ancistrus saudades =

Conservation status
- Least Concern (IUCN 3.1)

Scientific classification
- Kingdom: Animalia
- Phylum: Chordata
- Class: Actinopterygii
- Order: Siluriformes
- Family: Loricariidae
- Genus: Ancistrus
- Species: A. saudades

Binomial name
- Ancistrus saudades Lesley S. de Souza, Taphorn & Armbruster, 2019

Species of freshwater fish

Ancistrus saudades is a species of freshwater ray-finned fish belonging to the family Loricariidae, the suckermouth armoured catfishes, and the subfamily Hypostominae, the suckermouth catfishes. This catfish is foumd in northern South America.

== Taxonomy ==
Ancistrus saudades was first formally described in 2019 by the ichthyologists Lesley S. de Souza, Donald Charles Taphorn Baechle and Jonathan W. Armbruster, with its type locality given as a creek at the second wooden bridge from Moco-Moco power station, Amazon/Branco/Takutu River, Region 9, Rupununi, Guyana, at 3.30318°, -59.65038°. Eschmeyer's Catalog of Fishes classified the genus Ancistrus in the subfamily Hypostominae, the suckermouth catfishes, within the suckermouth armored catfish family Loricariidae. It has also been classified in the tribe Ancistrini by some authorities.

== Etymology ==
Ancistrus saudades is classified in the genus Ancistrus, a name coined by Rudolf Kner, but when he proposed the genus he did not explain the etymology of the name. It is thought to be from the Greek ágkistron, meaning a "fish hook" or the "hook of a spindle", a reference to the hooked odontodes on the interopercular bone. The specific name, saudades, is a Portuguese word used to express a deep yearning or profound sadness for a person, place or experience; the authors said “It has a deeper tone and meaning than a direct English translation and reflects the first author’s connection to her Brazilian heritage and her nostalgia for field work in remote wilderness areas”.

== Description ==
Ancistrus saudades can be told apart from other Guianan shield Ancistrusspecies, in having large, round spots on the caudal fin, flanks and underside, . Ancistrus species develop soft, bushy tentacles on the snout when sexually mature, these are better developed in the males than they are in females. This catfish reaches a standard length of 10.8 cm (4.3 in).

== Distribution and habitat ==
Ancistrus saudades is found in South America where it has a wide distribution in the upper Branco River basin and Guiana Shield drainages of the Orinoco basin in Brazil, Guyana and Venezuela. This species is found in pools and riffles, it has a deeper-body relative to other Ancistrus species, an indication that it can live instreams wiuth a slower flow.
