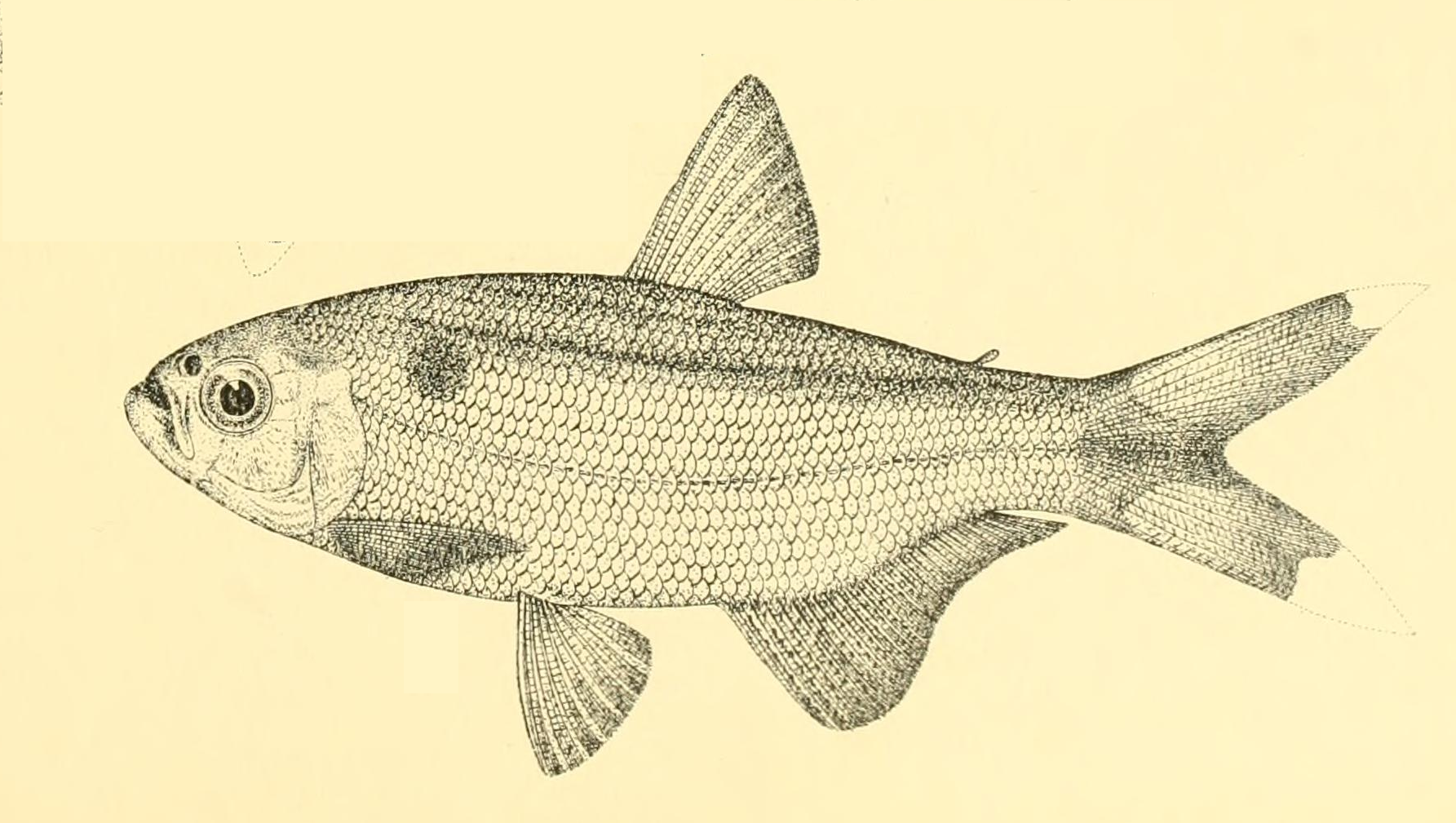
- Acrobrycon ipanquianus

Scientific classification
- Kingdom: Animalia
- Phylum: Chordata
- Class: Actinopterygii
- Order: Characiformes
- Family: Stevardiidae
- Subfamily: Hemibryconinae
- Genus: Acrobrycon; C. H. Eigenmann & N. E. Pearson, 1924

Type species
- Tetragonopterus ipanquianus Cope, 1877

= Acrobrycon =

Genus of fishes

Acrobrycon is a genus of freshwater ray-finned fish belonging to the family Stevardiidae. The fishes in this genus are found in tropical South America.

== Species ==
There are currently 4 recognized species in this genus:

- Acrobrycon ipanquianus (Cope, 1877)
- Acrobrycon ortii Arcila-Mesa, Vari & Menezes, 2014
- Acrobrycon starnesi Arcila-Mesa, Vari & Menezes, 2014
- Acrobrycon tarijae Fowler, 1940
