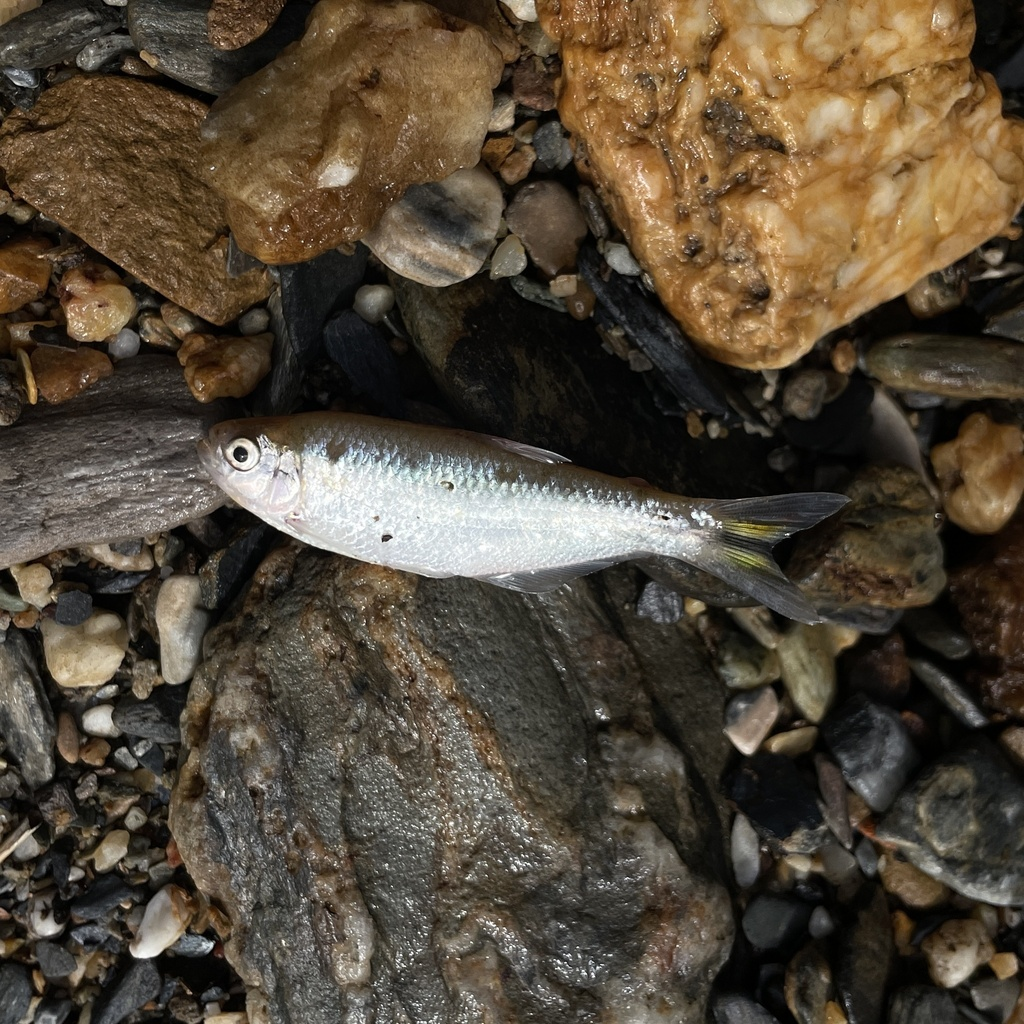

Conservation status
- Near Threatened (IUCN 3.1)

Scientific classification
- Kingdom: Animalia
- Phylum: Chordata
- Class: Actinopterygii
- Order: Characiformes
- Family: Stevardiidae
- Genus: Hemibrycon
- Species: H. taeniurus

Binomial name
- Hemibrycon taeniurus (Gill, 1858)

Synonyms
- Poecilurichthys taeniurus Gill, 1858; Tetragonopterus (Hemibrycon) trinitatis Lütken [C. F.] 1875

= Hemibrycon taeniurus =

Species of fish

Hemibrycon taeniurus, the mountain stream sardine, is a species of freshwater ray-finned fish, a characin, belonging to the family Stevardiidae. This species is endemic to Trinidad in Trinidad and Tobago.
