= Bosquet (surname) =

Bosquet is a surname. Notable people with the surname include:

- Alain Bosquet (1919–1998), French poet
- Albert Bosquet, Belgian sport shooter
- Amélie Bosquet, French writer
- Andrée Bosquet, Belgian painter
- Bernard du Bosquet, French archbishop and cardinal
- Gilles Bosquet, French rower
- Marta Bosquet, Spanish politician
- Pierre Bosquet (1810–1861), Marshal of France
- Rosalie Bosquet, birth name of Madame Max Adolphe
- Sébastien Bosquet, French handball player

== See also ==
- Bousquet, a surname
