= Neblinichthys pilosus =

Conservation status
- Least Concern (IUCN 3.1)

Scientific classification
- Kingdom: Animalia
- Phylum: Chordata
- Class: Actinopterygii
- Order: Siluriformes
- Family: Loricariidae
- Subfamily: Hypostominae
- Genus: Neblinichthys
- Species: N. pilosus

Binomial name
- Neblinichthys pilosus Ferraris, Isbrücker & Nijssen, 1986

Species of fish

Neblinichthys pilosus is a species of freshwater ray-finned fish belonging to the family Loricariidae, the suckermouth armoured catfishes, and the subfamily Hypostominae, the suckermouth catfishes. This catfish is endemic to Venezuela where it is known only from the Baria River in the Rio Negro basin. This species grows to a standard length of 8.9 cm (3.5 in).
