= Rhinodoras thomersoni =

Conservation status
- Least Concern (IUCN 3.1)

Scientific classification
- Kingdom: Animalia
- Phylum: Chordata
- Class: Actinopterygii
- Order: Siluriformes
- Family: Doradidae
- Genus: Rhinodoras
- Species: R. thomersoni

Binomial name
- Rhinodoras thomersoni Taphorn & Lilyestrom, 1984

Species of fish

Rhinodoras thomersoni is a species of thorny catfish native to Colombia and Venezuela where it is found in the river basins along the southwest shore of Lake Maracaibo (Santa Ana, Catatumbo and Escalante Rivers). This species grows to a length of 20 centimetres (7.9 in) SL.
