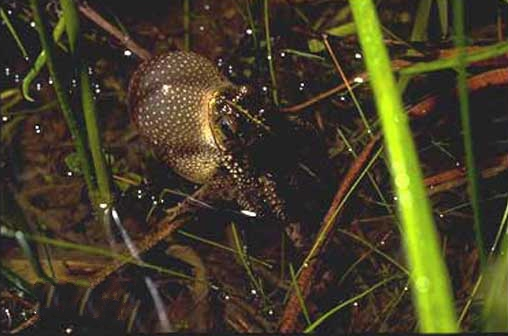

Conservation status
- Least Concern (IUCN 3.1)

Scientific classification
- Kingdom: Animalia
- Phylum: Chordata
- Class: Amphibia
- Order: Anura
- Family: Bufonidae
- Genus: Rhinella
- Species: R. dorbignyi

Binomial name
- Rhinella dorbignyi (Duméril & Bibron, 1841)

Synonyms
- Bufo d'Orbignyi Duméril and Bibron, 1841; Bufo dorbignyi Duméril and Bibron, 1841; Bufo globulosus d'orbignyi Duméril and Bibron, 1841; Chaunus dorbignyi (Duméril and Bibron, 1841)

= Rhinella dorbignyi =

Species of amphibian

Rhinella dorbignyi is a South American species of toad in the family Bufonidae. The specific name, dorbignyi, is in honor of French naturalist Alcide d'Orbigny. Its common name is d'Orbigny's toad or Dorbigny's toad [sic].

Rhinella dorbignyi has been in the past treated as subspecies of Bufo globulosus (now Rhinella granulosa). Rhinella dorbignyi can hybridize with Rhinella fernandezae; these species might be conspecific.

== Description ==
Males measure 36–64 mm (1.4–2.5 in) and females 42–69 mm (1.7–2.7 in) in snout–vent length (one specimen of 77 mm (3.0 in) SVL has been reported). Head is rounded and high, and supraorbital crest is continuous and very high and thick. Dorsum has keratinized tubercles of variable sizes, conical or rounded.

== Geographic range ==
Rhinella dorbignyi is found in northeastern Argentina, Uruguay, and southeastern Brazil.

== Habitat and behaviour ==
The natural habitats of Rhinella dorbignyi are open areas such as pastures and Pampas grassland; it can persists in areas of heavy agricultural activity. It is a common species that is not threatened.

Rhinella dorbignyi are sit-and-wait predators. They are found inside small holes or under stones, with the head at the entrance, retreating when disturbed. Breeding takes place at spring and summer (October to March) after heavy rains in temporary and permanent waterbodies.
