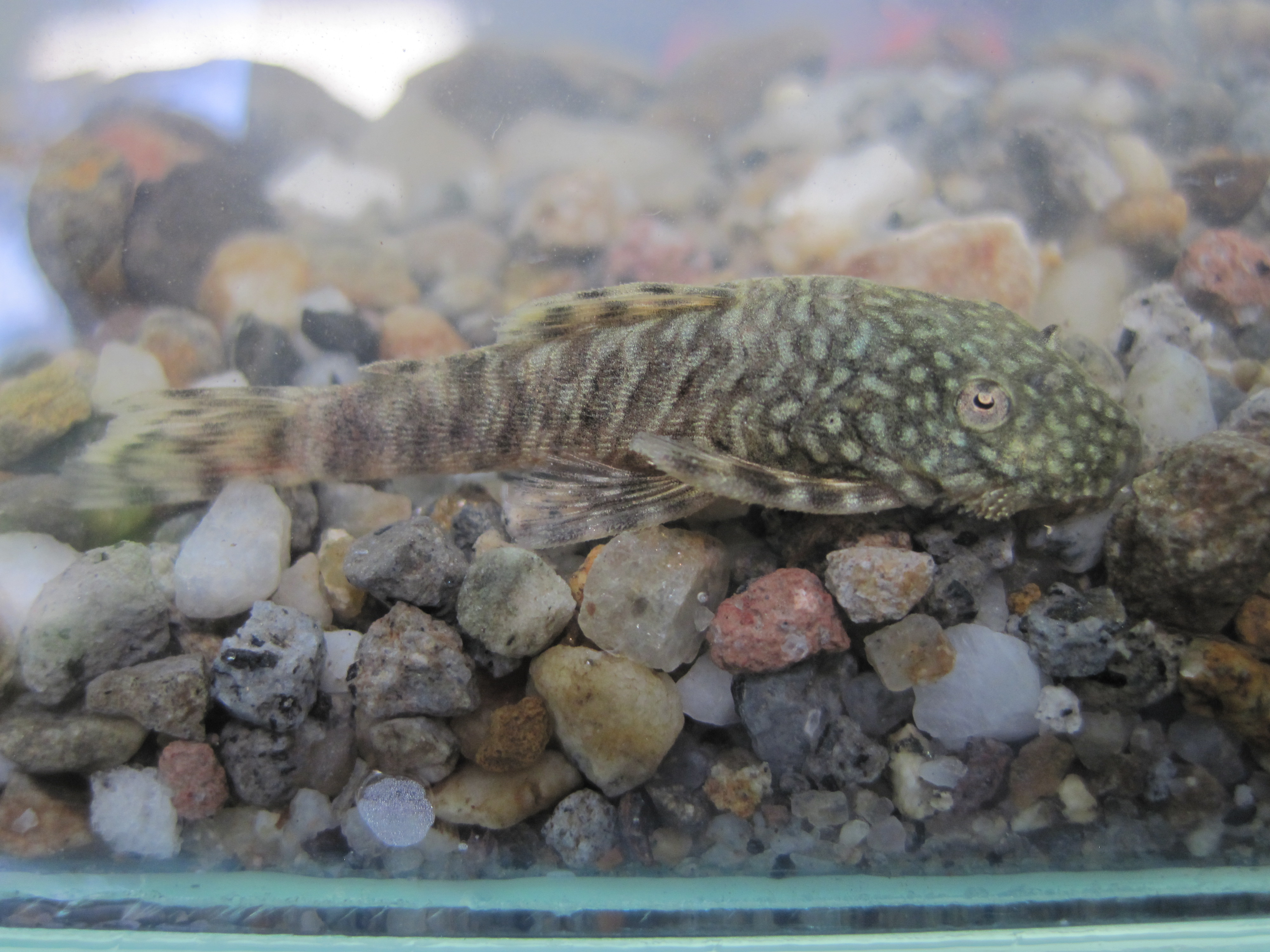

Conservation status
- Least Concern (IUCN 3.1)

Scientific classification
- Kingdom: Animalia
- Phylum: Chordata
- Class: Actinopterygii
- Order: Siluriformes
- Family: Loricariidae
- Genus: Ancistrus
- Species: A. caucanus

Binomial name
- Ancistrus caucanus Fowler, 1943

= Ancistrus caucanus =

Species of fish

Ancistrus caucanus is a species of freshwater ray-finned fish belonging to the family Loricariidae, the suckermouth armoured catfishes, and the subfamily Hypostominae, the suckermouth catfishes. This catfish is endemic to Colombia.

== Taxonomy ==
Ancistrus caucanus was first formally described in 1943 by the American zoologist Henry Weed Fowler with its type locality given as Sonsón in the Cauca River drainage system of Colombia. Eschmeyer's Catalog of Fishes classified the genus Ancistrus in the subfamily Hypostominae, the suckermouth catfishes, within the suckermouth armored catfish family Loricariidae. It has also been classified in the tribe Ancistrini by some authorities.

== Etymology ==
Ancistrus caucanus is classified in the genus Ancistrus, a name coined by Rudolf Kner when he proposed the genus but Kner did not explain the etymology of the name. It is thought to be from the Greek ágkistron, meaning a "fish hook" or the "hook of a spindle", a reference to the hooked odontodes on the interopercular bone. The specific name, caucanus, means "from the Cauca", this is a misnomer as the species actually occurs in the Magdalena River system.

== Description ==
Ancistrus caucanus reaches a standard length of 5.2 cm (2.0 in). Ancistrus species develop soft, bushy tentacles on the snout when sexually mature, these are better developed in the males than they are in females. Preserved specimens of this catfish show some white spots or blotches, the pale caudal fin has irregularly shaped black spots arranged in 4 or 5 bands; the plates along the lateral line have normal sized odontodes which mostly point rearwards and the plates do not overlap. The pectoral fin extends past the centre of the pelvic fin base when flattened and there is a single plate in front of the adipose fin and the flattened dorsal fin extends to that plate. Caudal fin light-colored with dark spots that often align to form vertical or oblique bars. The snout is over half the length of the head and the eye is just smaller than the length of the snout.

== Distribution and habit ==
Ancistrus caucanus is found in South America where it occurs in the Magdalena River in Colombia where it is found in torrential streams.
