= Neblinichthys yaravi =

Conservation status
- Data Deficient (IUCN 3.1)

Scientific classification
- Kingdom: Animalia
- Phylum: Chordata
- Class: Actinopterygii
- Order: Siluriformes
- Family: Loricariidae
- Subfamily: Hypostominae
- Genus: Neblinichthys
- Species: N. yaravi

Binomial name
- Neblinichthys yaravi (Steindachner, 1915)

Synonyms
- Ancistrus (Hemiancistrus) yaravi Steindachner, 1915; Peckoltia yaravi (Steindachner, 1915)

Species of fish

Neblinichthys yaravi is a species of freshwater ray-finned fish belonging to the family Loricariidae, the suckermouth armoured catfishes, and the subfamily Hypostominae, the suckermouth catfishes. This catfish is endemic to Venezuela where it is found in the Kuquenan River basin in the Guiana Shield, in Bolívar state. This species grows to a standard length of 4.7 cm (1.9 in).
