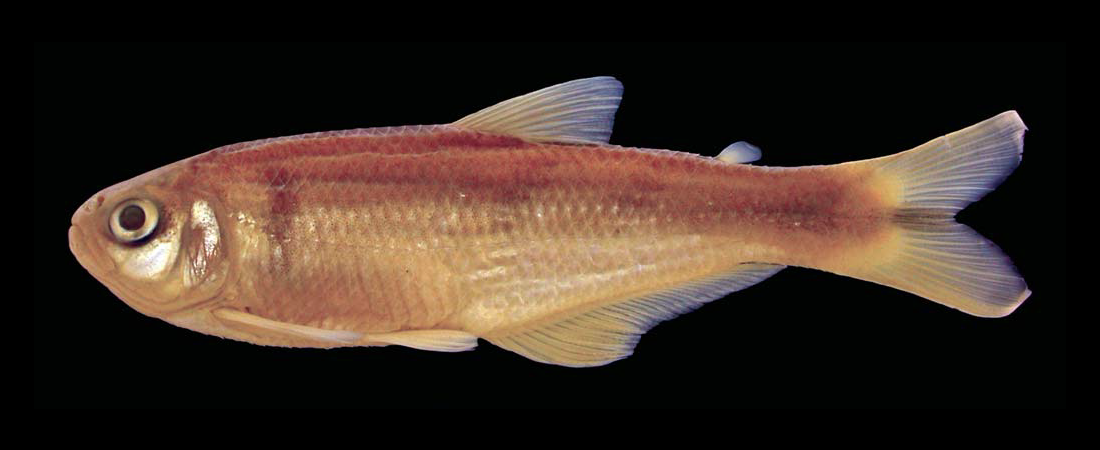
- Hemibrycon polyodon, the type species of the genus Hemibrycon.

Scientific classification
- Kingdom: Animalia
- Phylum: Chordata
- Class: Actinopterygii
- Order: Characiformes
- Family: Stevardiidae
- Subfamily: Hemibryconinae; Géry, 1966

Type genus
- Hemibrycon Günther, 1864

= Hemibryconinae =

Subfamily of fishes

Hemibryconinae is a subfamily of freshwater ray-finned fishes belonging to the family Stevardiidae. The subfamily comprises genera which were previously classified in the family Characidae, but this was split into multiple families in 2024. They are found in South and Central America.

== Genera ==
Hemibryconinae contains the following genera:

- Acrobrycon C. H. Eigenmann & Pearson, 1924
- Hemibrycon Günther, 1864
