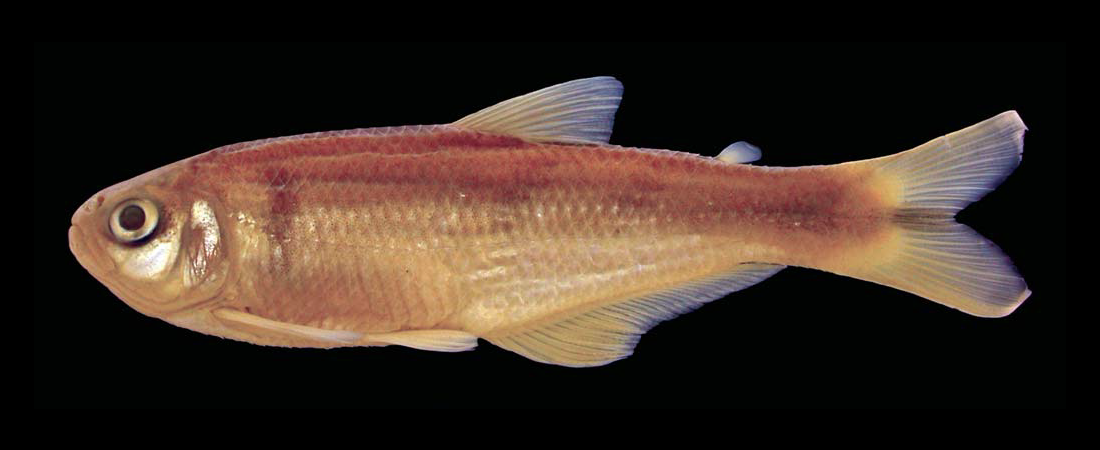

Conservation status
- Least Concern (IUCN 3.1)

Scientific classification
- Kingdom: Animalia
- Phylum: Chordata
- Class: Actinopterygii
- Order: Characiformes
- Family: Stevardiidae
- Genus: Hemibrycon
- Species: H. polyodon

Binomial name
- Hemibrycon polyodon (Günther, 1864)

Synonyms
- Tetragonopterus polyodon Günther, 1864

= Hemibrycon polyodon =

Species of fish

Hemibrycon polyodon is a species of freshwater ray-finned fishes, a characin, belonging to the family Stevardiidae. This species has a restricted range in Ecuador and Peru.

== Taxonomy ==
Hemibrycon polyodon was first formally described as Tetragonopterus polyodon in 1964 by the German-born British herpetologist and ichthyologist Albert Günther, with its type locality given as Guayaquil, Ecuador. At the same time as he described this species, Günther proposed a new monospecific subgenus, Hemibrycon, of the genus Tetragonopterus; this means that this species is the type species of the genus Hemibrycon by monotypy. The genus Hemibrycon is the type genus of the subfamily Hemibryconinae, of the family Stevardiidae, in the suborder Characoidei of the order Characiformes.

== Etymology ==
Hemibrycon polyodon is the type species of the genus Hemibrycon. This name prefixes the Greek hemi, derived from the Greek hḗmisys, and meaning "half". Günther did not explain what he was alluding to, but it may refer to the mouth cleft of H. polyodon, which he described as being "of moderate width" compared with "rather wide" cleft of Brycon. Brycon is a generalised term, derived from the Greek brýchō, meaning to "bite", "gnash teeth" or "eat greedily". This is used in the genus names of many characiform fishes, and refers to the fully toothed maxilla of these fishes. The specific name, polyodon, means "many teeth", and refers to the teeth along the entire edge of the dentary.

== Description ==
Hemibrycon polyodon has an elongate body with a compressed cross section and a maximum standard length of 16.8 cm (6.6 in). The dorsal fin contains 8 soft rays while the anal fin is supported by between 24 and 28 soft rays.

== Distribution and habitat ==
Hemibrycon polyodon is restricted to Ecuador and Peru. In Peru it is found in the Pastaza River in the Maranon River system, and it has also been found in the Apurímac River valley. In the Ecuador it occurs in the Napo and Morona Santiago basin. This species is found at altitudes between 500 and 1,000 m (1,600 and 3,300 ft) above sea level in clear, fast flowing rainforest streams.
