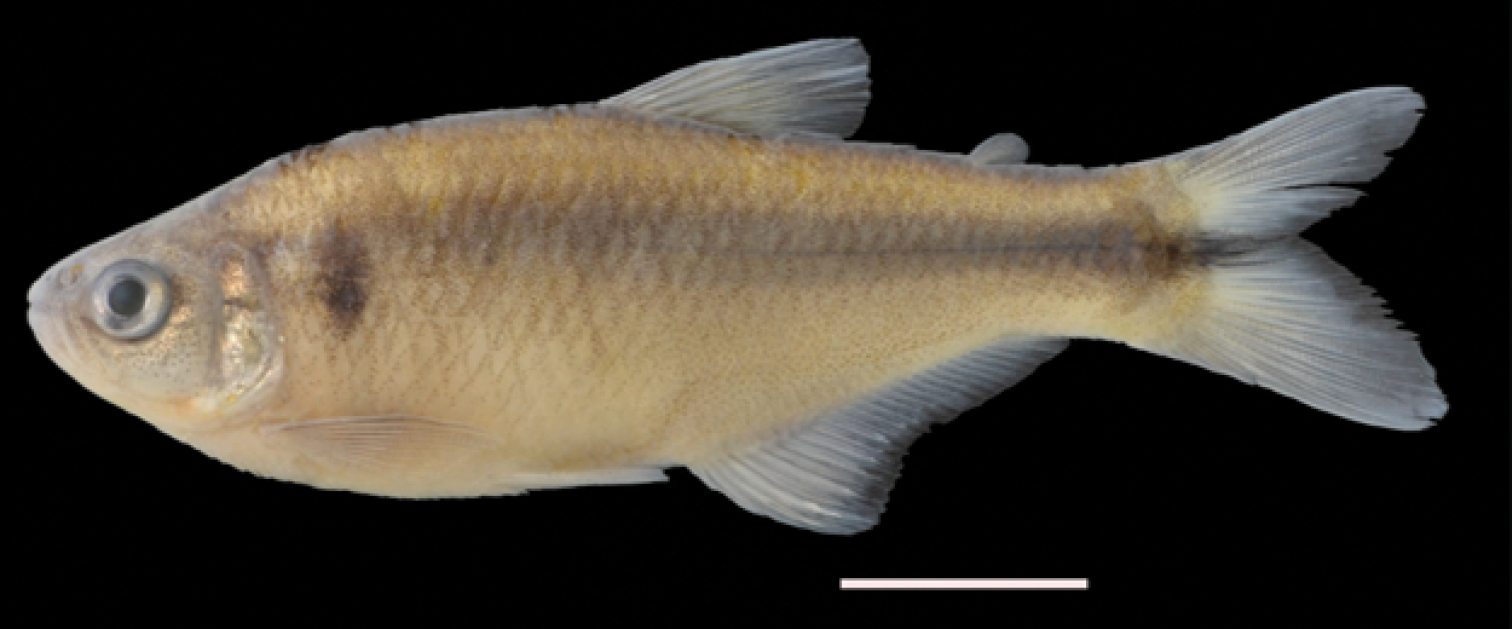

Scientific classification
- Kingdom: Animalia
- Phylum: Chordata
- Class: Actinopterygii
- Order: Characiformes
- Family: Stevardiidae
- Genus: Hemibrycon
- Species: H. sanjuanensis

Binomial name
- Hemibrycon sanjuanensis Román-Valencia, Ruiz-Calderón, Taphorn & García-Alzate, 2014
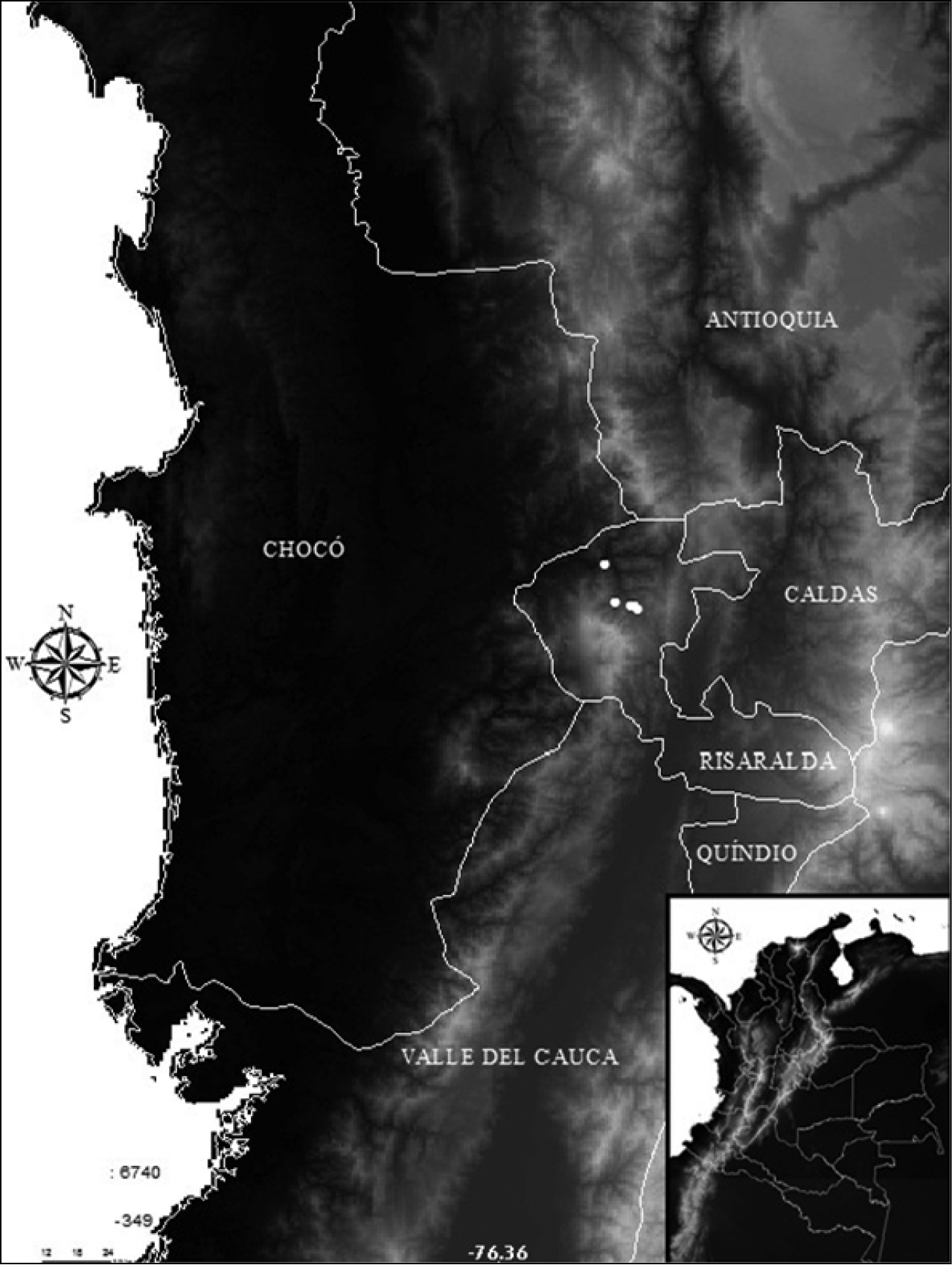
- Range of H. sanjuanensis

= Hemibrycon sanjuanensis =

Species of fish

Hemibrycon sanjuanensis is a species of characin from the upper San Juan River, Colombia.

== Etymology ==
It takes its name from the San Juan River, where specimens were collected.

== Description ==
Individuals range between 21.3–84.9 millimetres (0.84–3.34 in) in length. The body is slender and long, with a short, compressed face and flexible lips. In an example of sexual dimorphism, the rays of males' pelvic and anal fins are lined with small hooks.

General coloration is a dark brownish-yellow, with a dark stripe running from directly behind the gills to the caudal peduncle. The ventral surface is light yellow. The dorsum and fins are patterned with melanophores. A reddish spot can be observed on the ventral part of the base of the caudal fin.

== Range and habitat ==
H. sanjuanensis is believed to be endemic to the upper San Juan River in Colombia. Specimens were recovered from clear, fast-flowing streams with sandy or rocky bottoms.

== Diet ==
The species is insectivorous. Among other things, it has been known to eat water scavenger beetles, black flies, flesh flies, damselflies, predaceous diving beetles, caddisflies, nematodes, and isopods.
