= Neblinichthys peniculatus =

Conservation status
- Data Deficient (IUCN 3.1)

Scientific classification
- Kingdom: Animalia
- Phylum: Chordata
- Class: Actinopterygii
- Order: Siluriformes
- Family: Loricariidae
- Genus: Neblinichthys
- Species: N. peniculatus

Binomial name
- Neblinichthys peniculatus Armbruster & Taphorn, 2013

Species of catfish

Neblinichthys peniculatus is a species of freshwater ray-finned fish belonging to the family Loricariidae, the suckermouth armoured catfishes, and the subfamily Hypostominae, the suckermouth catfishes. This catfish is endemic to Venezuela where it is only known from the Carapo River, in the drainage of the Paragua River in the Guiana Shield in the state of Bolívar. This species reaches a standard length of 8.1 cm (3.2 in).
