= Rhinodoras boehlkei =

Conservation status
- Least Concern (IUCN 3.1)

Scientific classification
- Kingdom: Animalia
- Phylum: Chordata
- Class: Actinopterygii
- Order: Siluriformes
- Family: Doradidae
- Genus: Rhinodoras
- Species: R. boehlkei

Binomial name
- Rhinodoras boehlkei Glodek, Whitmire & Orcés-V. (es), 1976

Species of fish

Rhinodoras boehlkei is a species of thorny catfish found in the upper Amazon basin of Ecuador and Peru. This species grows to a length of 13.3 centimetres (5.2 in) SL.
