= Rhinodoras armbrusteri =

Scientific classification
- Kingdom: Animalia
- Phylum: Chordata
- Class: Actinopterygii
- Order: Siluriformes
- Family: Doradidae
- Genus: Rhinodoras
- Species: R. armbrusteri

Binomial name
- Rhinodoras armbrusteri Sabaj Pérez, 2008

Species of fish

Rhinodoras armbrusteri is a species of thorny catfish known from the Takutu River and Ireng Rivers that drains into the upper Rio Branco in Guyana and Roraima State, Brazil; it is also known from the Rupununi River in the Essequibo River basin in southwestern Guyana. This species grows to a length of 9.62 centimetres (3.79 in) SL.
