= Rhinodoras gallagheri =

Conservation status
- Least Concern (IUCN 3.1)

Scientific classification
- Kingdom: Animalia
- Phylum: Chordata
- Class: Actinopterygii
- Order: Siluriformes
- Family: Doradidae
- Genus: Rhinodoras
- Species: R. gallagheri

Binomial name
- Rhinodoras gallagheri Sabaj Pérez, Taphorn & Castillo G., 2008

Species of fish

Rhinodoras gallagheri is a species of thorny catfish known from Apure River, Capanaparo River, and Arauca River, all left bank tributaries of the middle Orinoco, in the llanos regions of Apure and Barinas States of Venezuela. It is also known from the Aguas de Limon River in the Arauca Department of Colombia. This species grows to a length of 14.95 centimetres (5.89 in) SL.
