= Paramyloplus ternetzi =

Conservation status
- Least Concern (IUCN 3.1)

Scientific classification
- Kingdom: Animalia
- Phylum: Chordata
- Class: Actinopterygii
- Order: Characiformes
- Family: Serrasalmidae
- Genus: Paramyloplus
- Species: P. ternetzi

Binomial name
- Paramyloplus ternetzi Norman, 1929

Synonyms
- Myleus ternetzi (Norman, 1929); Myloplus ternetzi (Norman, 1929); Myleus (Paramyloplus) ternetzi goslinei Géry, 1972

Species of fish

Paramyloplus ternetzi, the pakusi, is a medium to large omnivorous fish of the family Serrasalmidae from South America, where it is found in the east and the northeastern Guiana Shield rivers. It can grow to a length of 23.1 cm (9.1 in).

== Etymology ==
The fish is named in honor of ichthyologist and naturalist Carl Ternetz (1870–1928), who made extensive collections of fish in French Guiana for the British Museum.
