= Paulasquama =

Conservation status
- Near Threatened (IUCN 3.1)

Scientific classification
- Kingdom: Animalia
- Phylum: Chordata
- Class: Actinopterygii
- Order: Siluriformes
- Family: Loricariidae
- Subfamily: Hypostominae
- Genus: Paulasquama; Armbruster & Taphorn, 2011
- Species: P. callis

Binomial name
- Paulasquama callis Ambruster & Taphorn, 2011

Species of fish

Paulasquama is a monospecific genus of freshwater ray-finned fish belonging to the family Loricariidae, the suckermouth armoured catfishes, and the subfamily Hypostominae, the suckermouth catfishes. The only species in the genus is Paulasquama callis which is known only from northwestern Guyana where it is found in the is known form the Kako, Kukui and Kamarang rivers in the upper Mazaruni River basin, These rivers drain the north-eastern flank of Mount Roraima. This species grows to a standard length of 4.7 cm (1.9 in).
