= Oxydoras sifontesi =

Conservation status
- Least Concern (IUCN 3.1)

Scientific classification
- Kingdom: Animalia
- Phylum: Chordata
- Class: Actinopterygii
- Order: Siluriformes
- Family: Doradidae
- Genus: Oxydoras
- Species: O. sifontesi

Binomial name
- Oxydoras sifontesi (Fernández-Yépez, 1968)

Synonyms
- Hildadoras orinocensis (Fernández-Yépez, 1968)

Species of fish

Oxydoras sifontesi, the Sierra Copora, is a species of thorny catfish found in the Orinoco River basin in Colombia and Venezuela. This species grows to a length of 76.0 centimetres (29.9 in) TL.
