= Hypostomus taphorni =

Scientific classification
- Domain: Eukaryota
- Kingdom: Animalia
- Phylum: Chordata
- Class: Actinopterygii
- Order: Siluriformes
- Family: Loricariidae
- Genus: Hypostomus
- Species: H. taphorni

Binomial name
- Hypostomus taphorni (Lilyestrom, 1984)

Synonyms
- Cochliodon taphorni

Species of catfish

Hypostomus taphorni is a species of catfish in the family Loricariidae. It is native to South America, where it occurs in the Essequibo River basin. The species reaches 22.8 cm (9.0 in) SL and is believed to be a facultative air-breather.

== Etymology ==
The fish is named in honor of American ichthyologist Donald C. Taphorn (b. 1951), a student of Venezuelan fishes and he also helped collect the holotype of the species.
