= Hyphessobrycon chocoensis =

Conservation status
- Data Deficient (IUCN 3.1)

Scientific classification
- Kingdom: Animalia
- Phylum: Chordata
- Class: Actinopterygii
- Order: Characiformes
- Family: Acestrorhamphidae
- Genus: Hyphessobrycon
- Species: H. chocoensis

Binomial name
- Hyphessobrycon chocoensis García-Alzate, Román-Valencia & Taphorn, 2013

Species of fish

Hyphessobrycon chocoensis is a species of freshwater ray-finned fish belonging to the family Acestrorhamphidae, the American characins. This fish is pale orange in colouration. It has a very thin and dark midline beginning at the base of the caudal fin and fading back to pale orange before it reaches the gills. It is around 4 centimetres (1.6 in) in length. It is known to inhabit the Telembí River Basin in Colombia. This fish is benthopelagic, meaning that it resides away from the surface of the water.
