= Neblinichthys roraima =

Conservation status
- Near Threatened (IUCN 3.1)

Scientific classification
- Kingdom: Animalia
- Phylum: Chordata
- Class: Actinopterygii
- Order: Siluriformes
- Family: Loricariidae
- Genus: Neblinichthys
- Species: N. roraima

Binomial name
- Neblinichthys roraima Provenzano R., Lasso A. & Ponte, 1995

Species of catfish

Neblinichthys roraima is a species of freshwater ray-finned fish belonging to the family Loricariidae, the suckermouth armoured catfishes, and the subfamily Hypostominae, the suckermouth catfishes. This catfish is endemic to Venezuela where it occurs the Kuquenan and Yuruani rivers in the Guiana Shield, in Bolívar state. This species reaches a standard length of 5.1 cm (2.0 in).
