= Liolaemus dorbignyi =

Conservation status
- Least Concern (IUCN 3.1)

Scientific classification
- Kingdom: Animalia
- Phylum: Chordata
- Class: Reptilia
- Order: Squamata
- Suborder: Iguania
- Family: Liolaemidae
- Genus: Liolaemus
- Species: L. dorbignyi

Binomial name
- Liolaemus dorbignyi Koslowsky, 1898

Species of lizard

Liolaemus dorbignyi, commonly known as D'Orbigny's tree iguana, is a species of lizard in the family Liolaemidae. The species is endemic to South America.

== Etymology ==
The specific name, dorbignyi, is in honor of French naturalist Alcide d'Orbigny.

== Geographic range ==
L. dorbignyi is native to Argentina and Bolivia.

== Habitat ==
The preferred natural habitat of L. dorbignyi is grassland, at altitudes of 3,900–4,350 m (12,800–14,270 ft).

== Description ==
Large and heavy-bodies for its genus, L. dorbignyi may attain a snout-to-vent length (SVL) of almost 10 cm (almost 4 in).

== Diet ==
L. dorbignyi is herbivorous.

== Reproduction ==
L. dorbignyi is viviparous.
