= Neblinichthys echinasus =

Conservation status
- Endangered (IUCN 3.1)

Scientific classification
- Kingdom: Animalia
- Phylum: Chordata
- Class: Actinopterygii
- Order: Siluriformes
- Family: Loricariidae
- Genus: Neblinichthys
- Species: N. echinasus

Binomial name
- Neblinichthys echinasus Taphorn, Armbruster, López-Fernández & Bernard, 2010

Species of catfish

Neblinichthys echinasus is a species of freshwater ray-finned fish belonging to the family Loricariidae, the suckermouth armoured catfishes, and the subfamily Hypostominae, the suckermouth catfishes. This catfish is endemic to Guyana where it occurs in the Kukui rivers, part of the upper Mazaruni River drainage and which flows off the northeastern flank of Mount Roraima. This species reaches a standard length of 8.3 cm (3.3 in).
