= Paramyloplus =

Scientific classification
- Kingdom: Animalia
- Phylum: Chordata
- Class: Actinopterygii
- Order: Characiformes
- Family: Serrasalmidae
- Subfamily: Myleinae
- Genus: Paramyloplus; Norman, 1929

Type species
- Paramyloplus ternetzi Norman, 1929

Genus of fishes

Paramyloplus is a genus of freshwater fish in the family Serrasalmidae found in northern South America. After its description, this genus was later synonymized with Myloplus, but was revived in 2021 as a distinct genus.

== Species ==
The following species are placed in this genus:

- Paramyloplus taphorni (Andrade, López-Fernández & Liverpool, 2019)
- Paramyloplus ternetzi Norman, 1929
