= Paramyloplus taphorni =

Conservation status
- Vulnerable (IUCN 3.1)

Scientific classification
- Kingdom: Animalia
- Phylum: Chordata
- Class: Actinopterygii
- Order: Characiformes
- Family: Serrasalmidae
- Genus: Paramyloplus
- Species: P. taphorni

Binomial name
- Paramyloplus taphorni (Andrade, López-Fernández & Liverpool, 2019)

Synonyms
- Myloplus taphorni Andrade, López-Fernández & Liverpool, 2019

Species of fish

Paramyloplus taphorni, Taphorn's catabac, is a species of freshwater ray-finned fish belonging to the family Serrasalmidae, the pacus, piranhas and related species.

== Location ==
This species is only known from Guyana.

== Length ==
This fish is only close to the size of other Paramyloplus

== Etymology ==
The species is named in honor of American ichthyologist Donald C. Taphorn (b. 1951), in recognition of over four decades of contributions to Neotropical ichthyology, his extensive role in training South American ichthyologists (including the authors), and his participation in the expedition during which the holotype was collected.
