= Neblinichthys brevibracchium =

Conservation status
- Endangered (IUCN 3.1)

Scientific classification
- Kingdom: Animalia
- Phylum: Chordata
- Class: Actinopterygii
- Order: Siluriformes
- Family: Loricariidae
- Genus: Neblinichthys
- Species: N. brevibracchium

Binomial name
- Neblinichthys brevibracchium Taphorn, Armbruster, López-Fernández & Bernard, 2010

Species of catfish

Neblinichthys brevibracchium is a species of freshwater ray-finned fish belonging to the family Loricariidae, the suckermouth armoured catfishes, and the subfamily Hypostominae, the suckermouth catfishes. This catfish is endemic to Guyana where it occurs in the Kako and Kukui rivers, both part of the upper Mazaruni River drainage and which flow off Mount Roraima. This species reaches a standard length of 8 cm (3.1 in).
