= Renova oscari =

Conservation status
- Vulnerable (IUCN 3.1)

Scientific classification
- Kingdom: Animalia
- Phylum: Chordata
- Class: Actinopterygii
- Order: Cyprinodontiformes
- Family: Rivulidae
- Genus: Renova; Thomerson & Taphorn, 1995
- Species: R. oscari

Binomial name
- Renova oscari Thomerson & Taphorn, 1995

Species of fish

Renova oscari is a species of killifish from the family Rivulidae which is endemic to the Orinoco River basin of Venezuela. This annual killifish grows to a standard length of 4.7 cm (1.9 in). This species is the only known member of its genus. It is found in the aquarium trade. This species was described in 1995 by Jamie E. Thomerson and Donald Charles Taphorn Baechle with the type locality given as the southwestern edge of Isla Raton in the vicinity of the village of Sabanita, upper Río Orinoco. The specific name honours Oscar León Mata (1964–2018), a killifish collector, environmental engineer and curator of fish at Museo de Ciencias Naturales in Guanare.
