= Ancistrus patronus =

Conservation status
- Least Concern (IUCN 3.1)

Scientific classification
- Kingdom: Animalia
- Phylum: Chordata
- Class: Actinopterygii
- Order: Siluriformes
- Family: Loricariidae
- Genus: Ancistrus
- Species: A. patronus

Binomial name
- Ancistrus patronus de Souza, Taphorn & Armbruster, 2019

Species of catfish

Ancistrus patronus is a species of freshwater ray-finned fish belonging to the family Loricariidae, the suckermouth armoured catfishes, and the subfamily Hypostominae, the suckermouth catfishes. This catfish is found in Colombia and Venezuela.

== Taxonomy ==
Ancistrus patronus was first formally described in 2016 by the ichthyologists Lesley S. de Souza, Donald Charles Taphorn Baechle and Jonathan W. Armbruster, with its type locality given as the Ventuari River at the mouth of the Camoni creek, 145 km (90 mi) north-northeast of Macaruco, 189 km (117 mi) northeast of San Fernando de Atabapo in the Orinoco River Basin of Amazonas, at 5.05588°, -66.32742°, in Venezuela. Eschmeyer's Catalog of Fishes classified the genus Ancistrus in the subfamily Hypostominae, the suckermouth catfishes, within the suckermouth armored catfish family Loricariidae. It has also been classified in the tribe Ancistrini by some authorities.

== Etymology ==
Ancistrus patronus is classified in the genus Ancistrus, a name coined by Rudolf Kner, but when he proposed the genus he did not explain the etymology of the name. It is thought to be from the Greek ágkistron, meaning a "fish hook" or the "hook of a spindle", a reference to the hooked odontodes on the interopercular bone. The specific name, patronus, means "protector" and "defender" in Latin, a reference to the guarding behaviour of brooding males of the genus Ancistrus, they defend their nests by raising the odontodes on their cheeks and blocking the nest to deny predators access.

== Description ==
Ancistrus patronus reaches a standard length of 8.7 cm (3.4 in). Ancistrus species develop soft, bushy tentacles on the snout when sexually mature, these are better developed in the males than they are in females.

== Distribution and habitat ==
Ancistrus patronus is found in northern South America where it is found in the Orinoco basin, upstream from the Cinaruco River, and in the Casiquiare River in eastern Colombia and western Venezuela. It is found in riffle and rapids, but this species has a relatively deep body which suggests it is more tolerant of slower waters than most related species.
