= Yutaje Falls =

Waterfall in Venezuela

Coordinates: 5°43′03″N 66°08′45″W

- Interactive map of Yutaje Falls
- Location: Northern Amazonas state, Venezuela
- Type: Cascade system
- Total height: 2,345 ft (715 m)
- Number of drops: 2 (two identical cascades)

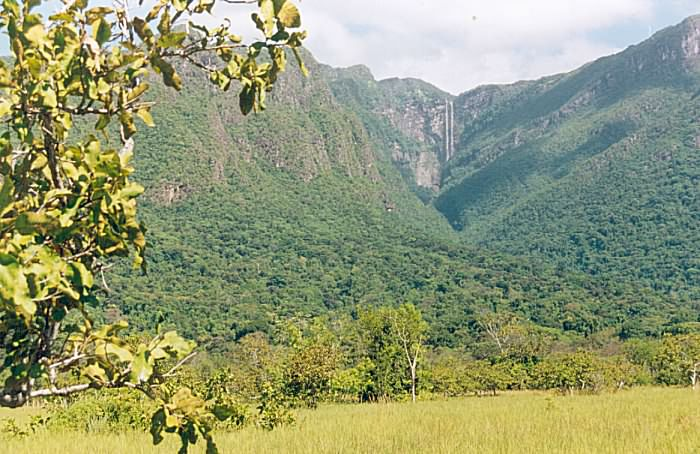
Yutajé Falls

The Yutaje Falls is the second-highest waterfall in Venezuela. It is approx. 2,345 ft (715 m) in height. It is a system of two identical cascades which are located in northern Amazonas state.

== See also ==
- List of waterfalls
