= Bousquet =

Bousquet is a surname. Notable people with the surname include:

- Adolphe Bousquet (1899–1972), French rugby union player
- Don Bousquet (born 1948), American cartoonist
- Francis Bousquet (1890–1942), French composer and music teacher
- Frédérick Bousquet (born 1981), French swimmer
- Gaston du Bousquet (1839–1910), French engineer for Chemin de Fer du Nord
- Georges-Henri Bousquet (1900–1978), French jurist, economist and Islamologist
- Jacques Bousquet (1883–1939), French actor and writer
- Joë Bousquet (1897–1950), French poet
- Julian Bousquet (born 1991), French rugby league player
- Marie-Louise Bousquet (1885–1975), French fashion journalist; wife of the playwright Jacques Bousquet (1883–1939)
- Raymond Henry Bousquet (1905–1935), birth name of Canadian boxer Del Fontaine
- René Bousquet (1909–1993), French civil servant, who served as secretary general to the Vichy regime police
- Rufus Bousquet (born 1958), Saint Lucian politician
- Shirley Bousquet (born 1976), French actress

== See also ==
- Le Bousquet, Aude, France
- Bousquet Ski Area, Pittsfield, Massachusetts
