= Oxydoras kneri =

Conservation status
- Least Concern (IUCN 3.1)

Scientific classification
- Kingdom: Animalia
- Phylum: Chordata
- Class: Actinopterygii
- Order: Siluriformes
- Family: Doradidae
- Genus: Oxydoras
- Species: O. kneri

Binomial name
- Oxydoras kneri Bleeker, 1862

Species of fish

Oxydoras kneri is a species of thorny catfish found in the Paraná River basin in Argentina, Bolivia, Brazil, Paraguay and Uruguay. This species grows to a length of 70.0 centimetres (27.6 in) TL and reaches a weight of 9.0 kilograms (19.8 lb). This species is caught commercially for human consumption. O. kneri is omnivorous, feeding mainly on insects, crustaceans, mollusks, other invertebrates and some vegetable material.
