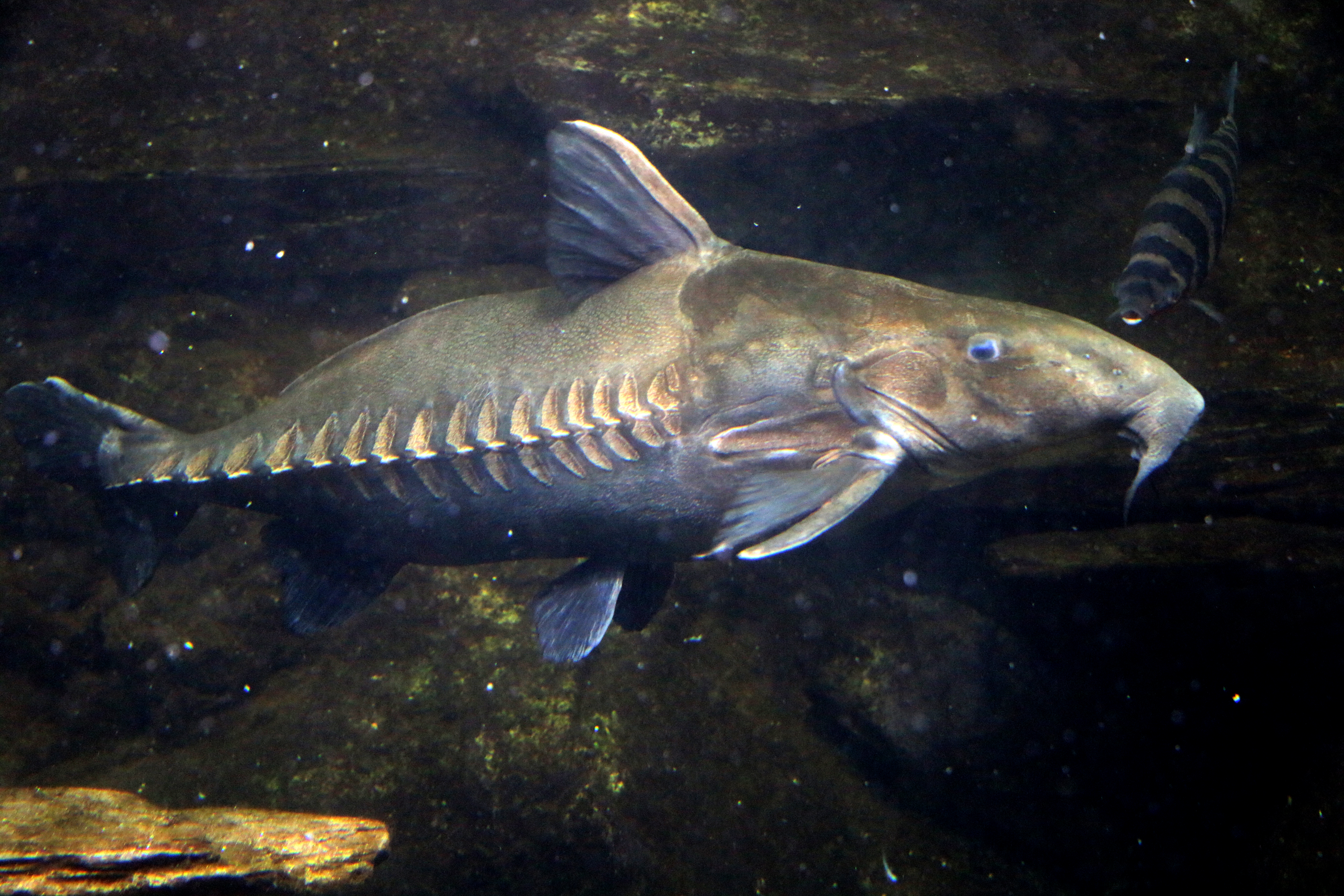
- Ripsaw catfish (Oxydoras niger)

Conservation status
- Least Concern (IUCN 3.1)

Scientific classification
- Kingdom: Animalia
- Phylum: Chordata
- Class: Actinopterygii
- Order: Siluriformes
- Family: Doradidae
- Genus: Oxydoras
- Species: O. niger

Binomial name
- Oxydoras niger (Valenciennes, 1821)

Synonyms
- Doras niger Valenciennes, 1821; Pseudodoras niger (Valenciennes, 1821); Rhinodoras niger (Valenciennes, 1821); Doras humboldti Spix & Agasiz, 1829; Corydoras edentatus Spix, 1829; Rhinodoras prianomus Cope, 1874; Rhinodoras teffeanus Steindachner, 1875; Oxydoras holdeni Fernández-Yépez, 1968; Pseudodoras holdeni (Fernández-Yépez, 1968)

= Oxydoras niger =

Ripsaw catfish

Species of fish

Oxydoras niger, commonly known as the ripsaw catfish or cuiu cuiu, is a species of thorny catfish native to the Amazon, Essequibo, and São Francisco river basins in Bolivia, Brazil, Colombia, Ecuador, Guyana, Peru and Venezuela. It is the largest member of the family Doradidae. It grows up to a length of 100 centimetres (3 ft 3 in) and weighs up to 13 kilograms (29 lb).

The species forms a minor part of local commercial fisheries. It has lateral thorns that can injure predators and human handlers. It feeds by sifting through sand and detecting edible items using taste receptors in the roof and floor of its mouth.

== Ecology ==
Oxydoras niger has been recorded in waters with temperatures ranging from 24–29.8 °C, a pH range of 5–9, and an alkalinity range of 42–142. It feeds on detritus, chironomid larvae, ephemeropteran larvae, and crustaceans. The species is known to form schools.

It typically inhabits muddy streams and lakes. During the rainy season, ripsaw catfish often migrate to large freshwater lakes and flooded basins, returning to their main river channel as floodwaters recede. Its wide distribution across the Amazon River is facilitated by the extensive river system and seasonal expansion of flood habitats.

== In the aquarium ==
Oxydoras niger is kept in aquaria, where it is known by several common names, including black talking catfish, mother of snails catfish, ripsaw catfish and black doradid. The species grows to a large size and is often sold as a juvenile, when aquarists may underestimate its eventual space requirements. It can rapidly outgrow smaller tanks, so it requires a very large enclosure. Although generally peaceful, it may eat very small tankmates. The species readily accepts prepared foods, but has not been bred under aquarium conditions.

== Behavior ==
Few studies have examined the behaviour of Oxydoras niger in the wild, although the species appears to require cover. It is rarely observed swimming in open water and often remains hidden for most of the day. Field observations found that around two-thirds of individuals were recorded during the daytime, contrasting with observations of the species in captivity. In captivity, individuals have been observed remaining under cover even in dark conditions. Behaviour may vary with age, as older individuals in captivity have been observed moving around their enclosures regardless of light or cover. It is unclear whether this behaviour results from the absence of predators in captivity or from conditions associated with isolation.

== Reproduction ==
O. niger is known to participate in an annual migratory run, known as the piracema. It is estimated that around 40 species undertake this migration, which lasts four months. Although the run is long and hazardous, it is associated with reproduction and offspring survival. The species ranges from the east coast of South America along the Amazon River, with many individuals recorded in the Juruá River. Some individuals have been found in the Andes Mountains at elevations of 3,000 feet (910 m).

At the beginning of the dry season, around June, when water levels begin to fall, the fish migrate upstream over distances of 100–400 km (62–250 mi). The migration may allow the species to disperse over larger areas and increase its chances of survival. By using flooded areas and moving between rivers, the species may be less vulnerable to localized disturbances.

Dam construction in the Amazon may threaten this migratory run by obstructing established routes and limiting access to spawning areas. Spawning begins during the rainy season, when water levels are high, which may reduce predation on adults and offspring. Females can lay up to 250,000 eggs, and sexual maturity is reached at about 54 centimetres (21 in). Few eggs survive to adulthood.

== Description ==
O. niger has barbels typical of a catfish and bony scutes along its body. These scutes have thorn-like projections along both sides and serve a defensive function. The species is sometimes called a "talking catfish" because it can produce sounds.

It produces these sounds through stridulation, by moving its pectoral spines against parts of the pectoral girdle. Stridulation is not unique to catfishes and also occurs in insects, in which hard body parts are rubbed together to produce sound. In O. niger, ridges on the pectoral spine rub against the cleithrum in the pectoral girdle. Different sounds may be produced during adduction and abduction movements. These sounds are thought to have different functions, such as warning predators and communicating with other individuals, depending on the frequency.

The mouth is inferior, or downward-facing, allowing the fish to feed from the substrate. The dorsal surface is dark-coloured, while the underside is lighter.

The species can be distinguished from related fishes by its relatively narrow body near the pectoral girdle, where the body width is less than the head length. Its eyes are positioned on the sides and posterior part of the head, rather than on top. It also has up to 40 scutes on each side of the body, compared with around 15–25 in some related taxa.

Although larger swim bladders have been associated with greater sensitivity to high frequencies in some fishes, studies of thorny catfishes have reported the opposite pattern, with smaller swim bladders linked to better hearing.

== Conservation ==
O. niger is listed as Least Concern by the IUCN Red List. It is used in local fisheries and is also present in the aquarium trade.

The species may be affected by broader human pressures on Amazonian freshwater habitats, including river development and dam construction. Hydroelectric dams are among the threats identified for Amazonian freshwater ecosystems and fisheries. Because the species takes a relatively long time to reach sexual maturity, its capacity for population recovery may be limited.

== Parasites ==
O. niger is susceptible to several parasites. A study in the basin of the Solimões River in Brazil examined parasite infection in 27 specimens of O. niger, 70.3% of which were infected by at least one parasite species. Recorded parasites included Cosmetocleithrum gussevi, Ichthyophthirius multifiliis, Chilodonella sp., Cosmetocleithrum confusus, Cosmetocleithrum parvum, and Cosmetocleithrum sp. Among the examined fish, 18.5% had intestinal infections by Paracavisona impudica, 3.7% by Cucullanus grandistomis, 14.8% by Dadaytrema, and 3% by Proteocephalus kuyukuyu. The parasite fauna of O. niger was diverse, with monogeneans the most prevalent group, followed by acanthocephalans and digeneans.

== Human interaction ==
O. niger appeared in the "Piranha" episode of River Monsters. The species is an omnivore that feeds mainly on material found in bottom sediments. Its lateral scutes and spines are defensive structures, but they can injure handlers. It is sold locally for food and has been described as having flesh similar in appearance to salmon.
