= Donald C. Taphorn =

American ichthyologist (born 1951)

- Born: Donald Charles Taphorn Baechle; September 8, 1951 (age 74); Belleville, Illinois, U.S.
- Education: Southern Illinois University Edwardsville (B.Sc.); University of Florida (M.Sc., Ph.D.)
- Known for: Taxonomy of South American freshwater fishes
- Scientific career
- Fields: Ichthyology
- Workplaces: Universidad Nacional Experimental de los Llanos Occidentales Ezequiel Zamora
- Author abbrev. (botany): Taphorn

Donald Charles Taphorn (born September 8, 1951), sometimes cited as Don Taphorn, Donald C. Taphorn B. or Donald C. Taphorn Baechle, is an American ichthyologist.

== Biography ==
Taphorn is the eldest of five children of Donald Clement Taphorn and Shirley Jean Taphorn (née Baechle). He attended Catholic elementary school and high school in Belleville. His interest in fish began with the gift of a goldfish from his grandmother. As an enthusiastic aquarist, he maintained several aquaria with tropical fish in his basement during his youth.

In 1972 he received a Bachelor of Science degree cum laude from Southern Illinois University Edwardsville (SIUE) and won the Outstanding Senior Award from the Department of Biology. One of his professors, Jamie E. Thomerson (1935–2015), fostered his interest in the taxonomy of tropical fishes of South America, particularly the seasonal fishes of the family Rivulidae.

He pursued graduate studies with Carter R. Gilbert (1930–2022) at the Department of Zoology, University of Florida, Gainesville, where he earned a Master of Science degree in 1976 with his thesis A systematic revision of the genera Rachovia Myers and Austrofundulus Myers.

From 1976 to 1977, he worked for the Venezuelan Ministry of the Environment on a biological control project in Lake Maracaibo with Craig Lilyestrom, attempting to use predatory fishes to control malaria-transmitting Anopheles mosquitoes. He subsequently taught systematic ichthyology at the Universidad del Zulia in Maracaibo for a year.

In 1978, Taphorn moved to Guanare, Portuguesa, Venezuela, joining the recently founded Universidad Nacional Experimental de los Llanos Occidentales Ezequiel Zamora (UNELLEZ). In 1979 he became a faculty member in the Department of Environmental Engineering. At UNELLEZ he founded the natural history museum “BioCentro” and the fish collection, serving as its curator to the present day, and until 2007 also as its director. The collection is regarded as one of the best organized in South America and contains nearly 50,000 specimens, fully catalogued in computerized databases. In 1989, Taphorn became coordinator of the graduate program in wildlife and fisheries management, jointly developed by UNELLEZ and the International Office of the U.S. Fish and Wildlife Service. In 1990, under the supervision of Carter R. Gilbert, he completed his Ph.D. at the University of Florida with the dissertation The characiform fishes of the Apure River drainage, Venezuela.

Taphorn retired in 2007 and returned to the United States, but he remains active in ichthyological research. His bibliography includes about 100 scientific publications, most in the taxonomy of Venezuelan freshwater fishes and the effects of human activities on aquatic ecosystems. He is a co-author of the descriptions of about 100 fish species, as well as the gecko species Lepidoblepharis montecanoensis (Markezich & Taphorn, 1994).

== Taxon named in his honor ==
Species named after him include the

=== Fishes ===
- Creagrutus taphorni (Vari & Harold, 2001)
- Farlowella taphorni (Retzer & Page, 1997)
- Hemigrammus taphorni (Benine & Lopes, 2007)
- Hyphessobrycon taphorni (García-Alzate, Román-Valencia & Ortega, 2013)
- Hypostomus taphorni (Lilyestrom, 1984)
- Lebiasina taphorni (Ardila Rodríguez, 2004)
- Myloplus taphorni (Andrade, López-Fernández & Liverpool, 2019)
- Paramyloplus taphorni (Andrade, López-Fernández & Liverpool, 2019)
- Phenacorhamdia taphorni (DoNascimiento & Milani, 2008)
- Sternarchorhynchus taphorni (de Santana & Vari, 2010)

=== Reptiles ===
- the snake Atractus taphorni (Schargel & García-Pérez, 2002).

== Species described by Donald C. Taphorn ==
Taphorn is the author or co-author of the descriptions of numerous fish taxa, including:

- Akawaio penak (Maldonado-Ocampo, López-Fernández, Taphorn, Bernard, Crampton & Lovejoy, 2013)
- Anablepsoides immaculatus (Thomerson, Nico & Taphorn, 1991)
- Ancistrus amaris (de Souza, Taphorn & Armbruster, 2019)
- Ancistrus falconensis (Taphorn, Armbruster & Rodríguez-Olarte, 2010)
- Ancistrus kellerae (de Souza, Taphorn & Armbruster, 2019)
- Ancistrus leoni (de Souza, Taphorn & Armbruster, 2019)
- Ancistrus patronus (de Souza, Taphorn & Armbruster, 2019)
- Ancistrus saudades (de Souza, Taphorn & Armbruster, 2019)
- Ancistrus tolima (Taphorn, Armbruster, Villa-Navarro & Ray, 2013)
- Ancistrus vericaucanus (Taphorn, Armbruster, Villa-Navarro & Ray, 2013)
- Ancistrus yutajae (de Souza, Taphorn & Armbruster, 2019)
- Apareiodon agmatos (Taphorn, López-Fernández & Bernard, 2008)
- Aphyocharax colifax (Taphorn & Thomerson, 1991)
- Apteronotus magoi (de Santana, Castillo & Taphorn, 2006)
- Astyanax boliviensis (Ruiz-C., Román-Valencia, Taphorn, Buckup & Ortega, 2018)
- Astyanax embera (Ruiz-C., Román-Valencia, Taphorn, Buckup & Ortega, 2018)
- Astyanax gandhiae (Ruiz-C., Román-Valencia, Taphorn, Buckup & Ortega, 2018)
- Austrofundulus guajira (Hrbek, Taphorn & Thomerson, 2005)
- Austrofundulus leohoignei (Hrbek, Taphorn & Thomerson, 2005)
- Austrofundulus leoni (Hrbek, Taphorn & Thomerson, 2005)
- Austrofundulus rupununi (Hrbek, Taphorn & Thomerson, 2005)
- Bryconamericus bucayensis (Román-Valencia, Ruiz-C., Taphorn & García-A., 2013)
- Bryconamericus caldasi (Román-Valencia, Ruiz-C., Taphorn & García-Alzate, 2014)
- Bryconamericus cinarucoense (Román-Valencia, Taphorn & Ruiz-C., 2008)
- Bryconamericus ecuadorensis (Román-Valencia, Ruiz-C., Taphorn, Jiménez-Prado & García-Alzate, 2015)
- Bryconamericus macarenae (Román-Valencia, García-Alzate, Ruiz-C. & Taphorn, 2010)
- Bryconamericus oroensis (Román-Valencia, Ruiz-C., Taphorn & García-A., 2013)
- Bryconamericus singularis (Román-Valencia, Taphorn & Ruiz-C., 2008)
- Bryconamericus zamorensis (Román-Valencia, Ruiz-C., Taphorn & García-A., 2013)
- Characidium amaila (Lujan, Agudelo-Zamora, Taphorn, Booth & López-Fernández, 2013)
- Characidium chancoense (Agudelo-Zamora, Ortega-Lara & Taphorn, 2020)
- Characidium longum (Taphorn, Montaña & Buckup, 2006)
- Cichla cataractae (Sabaj Pérez, López-Fernández, Willis, Hemraj, Taphorn & Winemiller, 2020)
- Creagrutus dulima (Albornoz-Garzón, Conde-Saldaña, García-Melo, Taphorn & Villa-Navarro, 2018)
- Creagrutus maculosus (Román-Valencia, García-Alzate, Ruiz-C. & Taphorn, 2010)
- Creagrutus melasma (Vari, Harold & Taphorn, 1994)
- Crenicichla zebrina (Montaña, López-Fernández & Taphorn, 2008)
- Epapterus blohmi (Vari, Jewett, Taphorn & Gilbert, 1984)
- Geophagus abalios (López-Fernández & Taphorn, 2004)
- Geophagus dicrozoster (López-Fernández & Taphorn, 2004)
- Geophagus grammepareius (Kullander & Taphorn, 1992)
- Geophagus winemilleri (López-Fernández & Taphorn, 2004)
- Guianacara cuyunii (López-Fernández, Taphorn & Kullander, 2006)
- Guianacara stergiosi (López-Fernández, Taphorn & Kullander, 2006)
- Hemiancistrus guahiborum (Werneke, Armbruster, Lujan & Taphorn, 2005)
- Hemibrycon antioquiae (Román-Valencia, Ruiz-C., Taphorn, Mancera-Rodriguez & García-Alzate, 2013)
- Hemibrycon cardalensis (Román-Valencia, Ruiz-C., Taphorn, Mancera-Rodriguez & García-Alzate, 2013)
- Hemibrycon fasciatus (Román-Valencia, Ruiz-C., Taphorn, Mancera-Rodriguez & García-Alzate, 2013)
- Hemibrycon guejarensis (Román-Valencia, Ruiz-C. & Taphorn, 2018)
- Hemibrycon palomae (Román-Valencia, García-Alzate, Ruiz-C. & Taphorn, 2010)
- Hemibrycon sanjuanensis (Román-Valencia, Ruiz-C., Taphorn & García-Alzate, 2014)
- Hemibrycon santamartae (Román-Valencia, Ruiz-C., García-Alzate & Taphorn, 2010)
- Hemibrycon sierraensis (García-Alzate, Román-Valencia & Taphorn, 2015)
- Hoplomyzon sexpapilostoma (Taphorn & Marrero, 1990)
- Hypancistrus contradens (Armbruster, Lujan & Taphorn, 2007)
- Hypancistrus debilittera (Armbruster, Lujan & Taphorn, 2007)
- Hypancistrus furunculus (Armbruster, Lujan & Taphorn, 2007)
- Hypancistrus lunaorum (Armbruster, Lujan & Taphorn, 2007)
- Hyphessobrycon amaronensis (García-Alzate, Román-Valencia & Taphorn, 2010)
- Hyphessobrycon chiribiquete (García-Alzate, Lima, Taphorn, Mojica, Urbano-Bonilla & Teixeira, 2020)
- Hyphessobrycon chocoensis (García-Alzate, Román-Valencia & Taphorn, 2013)
- Hyphessobrycon klausanni (García-Alzate, Urbano-Bonilla & Taphorn, 2017)
- Hyphessobrycon natagaima (García-Alzate, Taphorn, Román-Valencia & Villa-Navarro, 2015)
- Hyphessobrycon oritoensis (García-Alzate, Román-Valencia & Taphorn, 2008)
- Hyphessobrycon paucilepis (García-Alzate, Román-Valencia & Taphorn, 2008)
- Hyphessobrycon sebastiani (García-Alzate, Román-Valencia & Taphorn, 2010)
- Hyphessobrycon taguae (García-Alzate, Román-Valencia & Taphorn, 2010)
- Hyphessobrycon tuyensis (García-Alzate, Román-Valencia & Taphorn, 2008)
- Laimosemion corpulentus (Thomerson & Taphorn, 1993)
- Laimosemion gransabanae (Lasso, Taphorn & Thomerson, 1992)
- Laimosemion lyricauda (Thomerson, Berkenkamp & Taphorn, 1991)
- Laimosemion nicoi (Thomerson & Taphorn, 1992)
- Laimosemion sape (Lasso-Alcalá, Taphorn, Lasso & León-Mata, 2006)
- Laimosemion tecminae (Thomerson, Nico & Taphorn, 1992)
- Lamontichthys llanero (Taphorn & Lilyestrom, 1984)
- Lamontichthys maracaibero (Taphorn & Lilyestrom, 1984)
- Lebiasina ardilai (Netto-Ferraira, Lopez-Fernandez, Taphorn & Liverpool, 2013)
- Llanolebias (Hrbek & Taphorn, 2008)
- Mazarunia charadrica (López-Fernández, Taphorn & Liverpool, 2012)
- Mazarunia pala (López-Fernández, Taphorn & Liverpool, 2012)
- Micromoema xiphophora (Thomerson & Taphorn, 1992)
- Neblinichthys brevibracchium (Taphorn, Armbruster, López-Fernández & Bernard, 2010)
- Neblinichthys echinasus (Taphorn, Armbruster, López-Fernández & Bernard, 2010)
- Neblinichthys peniculatus (Armbruster & Taphorn, 2013)
- Parodon alfonsoi (Londoño-Burbano, Román-Valencia & Taphorn, 2011)
- Parodon atratoensis (Londoño-Burbano, Román-Valencia & Taphorn, 2011)
- Parodon magdalenensis (Londoño-Burbano, Román-Valencia & Taphorn, 2011)
- Paulasquama (Armbruster & Taphorn, 2011)
- Paulasquama callis (Armbruster & Taphorn, 2011)
- Pseudancistrus reus (Armbruster & Taphorn, 2008)
- Rachovia pyropunctata (Taphorn & Thomerson, 1978)
- Renova (Thomerson & Taphorn, 1995)
- Renova oscari (Thomerson & Taphorn, 1995)
- Rhinodoras gallagheri (Sabaj Pérez, Taphorn & Castillo, 2008)
- Rhinodoras thomersoni (Taphorn & Lilyestrom, 1984)
- Rhynchodoras castilloi (Birindelli, Sabaj Pérez & Taphorn, 2007)
- Sternarchorhynchus gnomus (de Santana & Taphorn, 2006)
- Terranatos (Taphorn & Thomerson, 1978)
- Tyttocharax metae (Román-Valencia, García-Alzate, Ruiz-C. & Taphorn, 2012)
- Xyliphius kryptos (Taphorn & Lilyestrom, 1983)
