= Rudolf Kner =

Austrian geologist, paleontologist, zoologist and ichthyologist

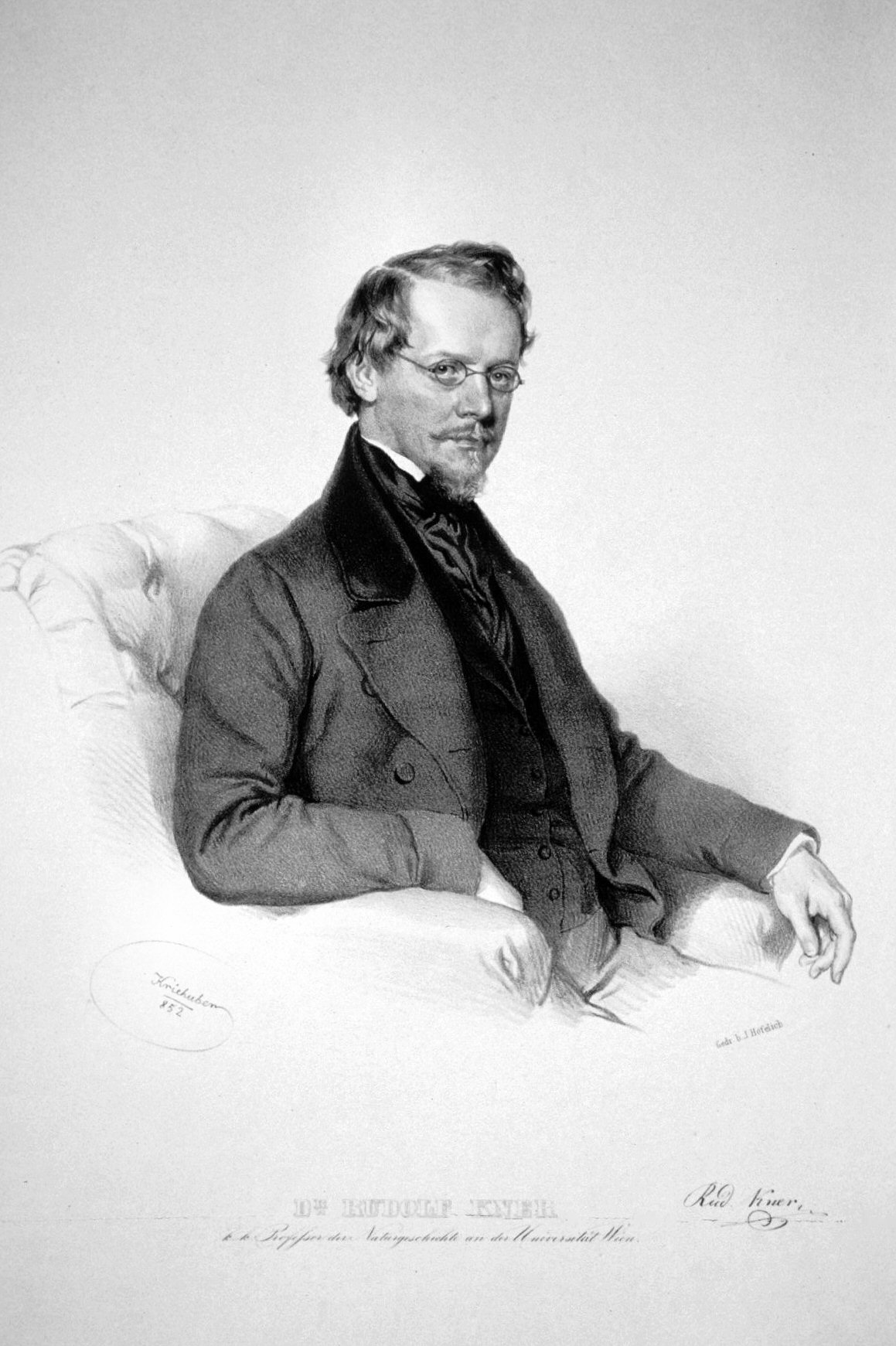
- Lithography of Kner by Josef Kriehuber, 1852
- Born: 24 August 1810; Linz, Austrian Empire
- Died: 27 October 1869 (aged 59); Vienna, Austria-Hungary
- Scientific career
- Fields: ichthyology
- Institutions: Vienna (Austria); Lviv (Ukraine)
- Author abbrev. (zoology): Kner

Rudolf Ignaz Kner (24 August 1810 – 27 October 1869) was an Austrian geologist, paleontologist, zoologist and ichthyologist. He also wrote some poems which were published by his brother-in-law K.A. Kaltenbrunner.

== Biography ==
Kner was born in Linz where his father Johann Evangelist Georg Kner (1763–1845) was a tax officer. His mother Barbara (1770–1825), daughter of forester Johann von Adlersburg was earlier married to apothecary Felix Gulielmo until his death. Barbara had a daughter Marie Gulielmo from her earlier marriage before having Rudolf and his sister Pauline. Pauline Anna Barbara Kner (1809–1843) married the Austrian poet Karl Adam Kaltenbrunner (1804-1867) in 1834. Rudolf studied in the secondary school in Linz from 1818 and the high school from 1821. During this period he was encouraged in the natural sciences with a gift of minerals from his uncle Hallstatt Maximilian Kner (1755–1821). From 1823 he went to the Stiftsgymnasium Kremsmünster. His godfather, Ignaz Rudolph Bischoff became mayor of Linz and had served as a doctor in the Army. From 1826 he went to the Lycaeum in Kremsmünster, taking a keen interest in botany. He then went to study medicine at Vienna in 1828 where he attended lectures by Franz Freiherrn von Jacquin (1766–1839) and Johann Ritter von Scherer (1755-1844). He received a medical degree in 1835. He then worked at the Kaiserlichen Hof-Naturalienkabinett (now Naturhistorisches Museum Wien) in Vienna, where he worked with Johann Jakob Heckel, among others. He accompanied Heckel on a collecting trip to Dalmatia in 1840. In 1841, he became professor for natural science at Lviv University. He returned to Vienna as professor of zoology (16 November 1849). His primary field of study was ichthyology, with interests in paleontology and geology.

Kner suffered from a stroke in 1868 and was bedridden. He died in Oed, Waldegg.

== Works ==
- Leitfaden zum Studium der Geologie, Vienna, 1851, 2nd edition 1855.
- Lehrbuch der Zoologie, Vienna, 1849, 2nd edition 1855, 3rd edition 1862.
- Die Süßwasserfische der österreichischen Monarchie, Leipzig, 1858 together with Heckel.
- Betrachtungen über die Ganoiden, als natürliche Ordnung, in: Sitzungsberichte der kaiserlichen Akademie der Wissenschaften [Vienna], 54 (1862), p. 519–536.

Apart from his work in paleontology and ichthyology, Kner also wrote some poetry. Some of these were included under the initials "R.K." in the works of his brother-in-law, Karl Adam Kaltenbrunner.

== Eponymy ==
The fish genus Kneria was named in his honor by Franz Steindachner. The catfish Oxydoras kneri was named in his honor by Pieter Bleeker. Kner's goby Pomatoschistus knerii although the patronym is not explicitly identified it is certainly in honor of Kner, named by his colleague Franz Steindachner.

== See also ==
- Category:Taxa named by Rudolf Kner
