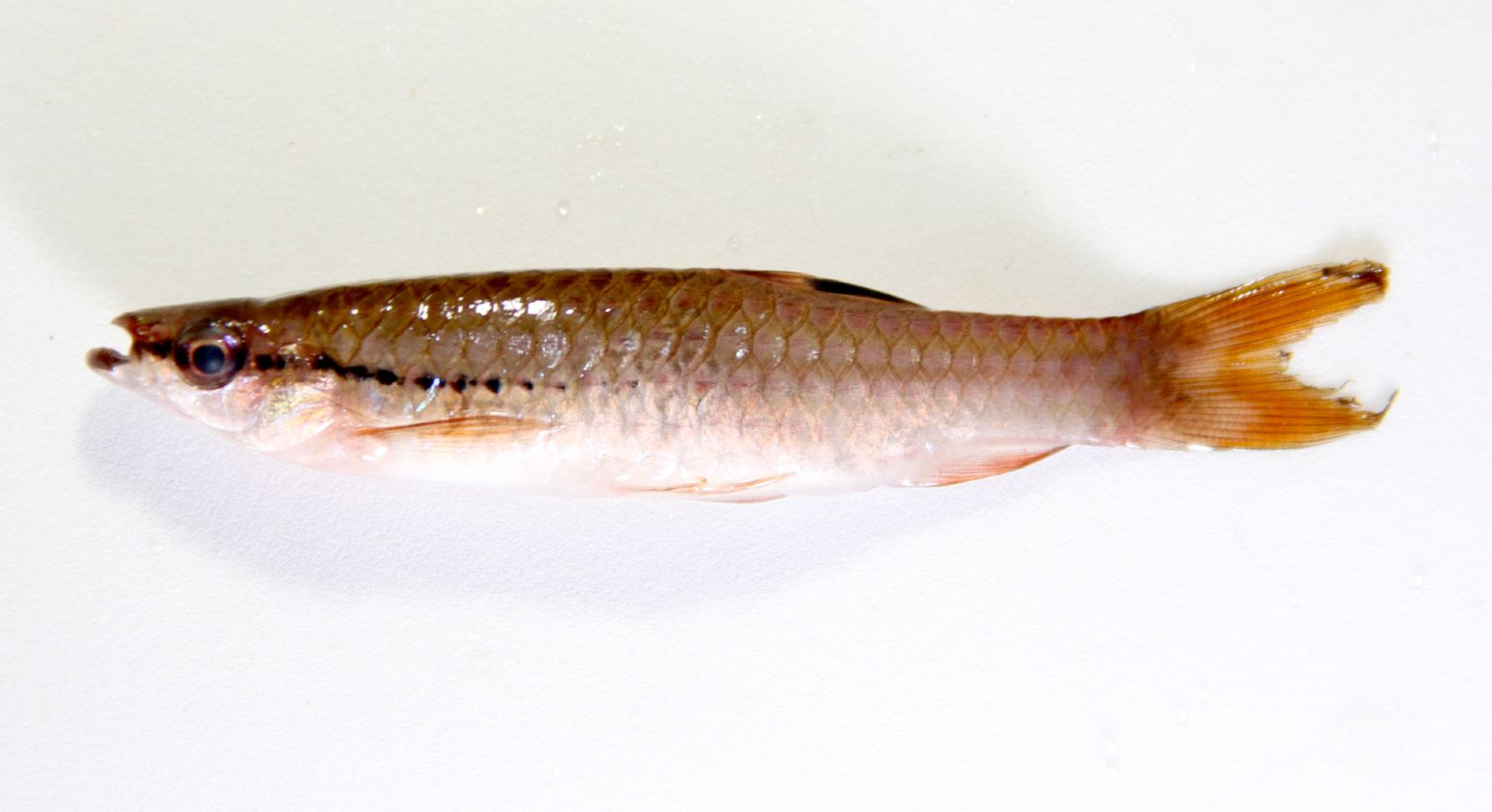
- Pyrrhulina sp.

Scientific classification
- Kingdom: Animalia
- Phylum: Chordata
- Class: Actinopterygii
- Order: Characiformes
- Family: Lebiasinidae
- Subfamily: Pyrrhulininae
- Genus: Pyrrhulina; Valenciennes, 1846

Type species
- Pyrrhulina filamentosa Valenciennes, 1847

Species
- See text

Synonyms
- Holotaxis Cope, 1870

= Pyrrhulina =

Genus of fishes

Pyrrhulina is a genus of freshwater ray-finned fishes belonging to the family Lebiasinidae, the pencil fishes, splash tetras and related fishes. The species in this genus are found in tropical South America. Several of these species are popular aquarium fish.

Pyrrhulina is closely related to Copeina and Copella, although it is distinguished from the former by having only one row of teeth (Copeina spp. have two). When the genus Copella was established, many species were removed from the genus Pyrrhulina and placed there, because differences in the maxillary bones in the males had been detected. Copella species are slimmer and more elongated than those species that remained in the genus Pyrrhulina.

== Species ==
Pyrrhulina contains the following valid species:

- Pyrrhulina australis C. H. Eigenmann & C. H. Kennedy, 1903
- Pyrrhulina beni N. E. Pearson, 1924
- Pyrrhulina brevis Steindachner, 1876
- Pyrrhulina capim Vieira & Netto-Ferreira, 2019
- Pyrrhulina eleanorae Fowler, 1940
- Pyrrhulina elongata Zarske & Géry, 2001
- Pyrrhulina filamentosa Valenciennes, 1847
- Pyrrhulina laeta (Cope, 1872) (halfbanded pyrrhulina)
- Pyrrhulina lugubris C. H. Eigenmann, 1922
- Pyrrhulina marilynae Netto-Ferreira & Marinho, 2013
- Pyrrhulina maxima C. H. Eigenmann & R. S. Eigenmann, 1889
- Pyrrhulina melanostoma (Cope, 1870) (blackmouth pyrrhulina)
- Pyrrhulina obermulleri G. S. Myers, 1926
- Pyrrhulina punctata , 2026
- Pyrrhulina rachoviana G. S. Myers, 1926 (fanning pyrrhulina)
- Pyrrhulina semifasciata Steindachner, 1876
- Pyrrhulina spilota S. H. Weitzman, 1960
- Pyrrhulina stoli Boeseman, 1953
- Pyrrhulina vittata Regan, 1912 (banded pyrrhulina)
- Pyrrhulina zigzag Zarske & Géry, 1997

== Taxonomy ==
Pyrrhulina was first proposed as a monospecific genus in 1846 by the French zoologist Achille Valenciennes when he described Pyrrhulina filamentosa as a new species, and the only species in the new genus Pyrrhulina. The type locality of P. filamentosa was given as Suriname. Pyrrhulina is classified within the subfamily Pyrrhulinae of the family Lebiasinidae, which also includes the pencil fishes and splash tetras, within the suborder Characoidei of the order Characiformes.

== Etymology ==
Pyrrhulina adds the suffix -ina, which means "to have the nature of", onto pyrrhós, meaning "flame coloured", apparently an allusion to the overall red coour of the type species, P. filamentosa.

== Environment ==
- Freshwater; benthopelagic. Tropical.

== Specifications ==
- Maturity: Lm 2.2
- Max length: 5.0 cm SL male/unsexed.
