= Nannostomus britskii =

Conservation status
- Least Concern (IUCN 3.1)

Scientific classification
- Kingdom: Animalia
- Phylum: Chordata
- Class: Actinopterygii
- Order: Characiformes
- Family: Lebiasinidae
- Genus: Nannostomus
- Species: N. britskii

Binomial name
- Nannostomus britskii S. H. Weitzman, 1978

Species of fish

Nannostomus britskii (from the Greek nanos, meaning "small"; the Latin stomus, relating to the mouth; and britskii in honor of ichthyologist Heraldo A. Britski), commonly known as the spotstripe pencilfish, is a freshwater species of fish belonging to the family Lebiasinidae of characins. They were first described in 1978 by Stanley H. Weitzman, along with two other new species (Nannostomus limatus and Nannostomus nitidus), from a collection of specimens preserved in the São Paulo museum. They have been recorded from only two localities, both in Brazil. No live specimens had been seen, collected, or exported for the aquarium trade until very recently.
