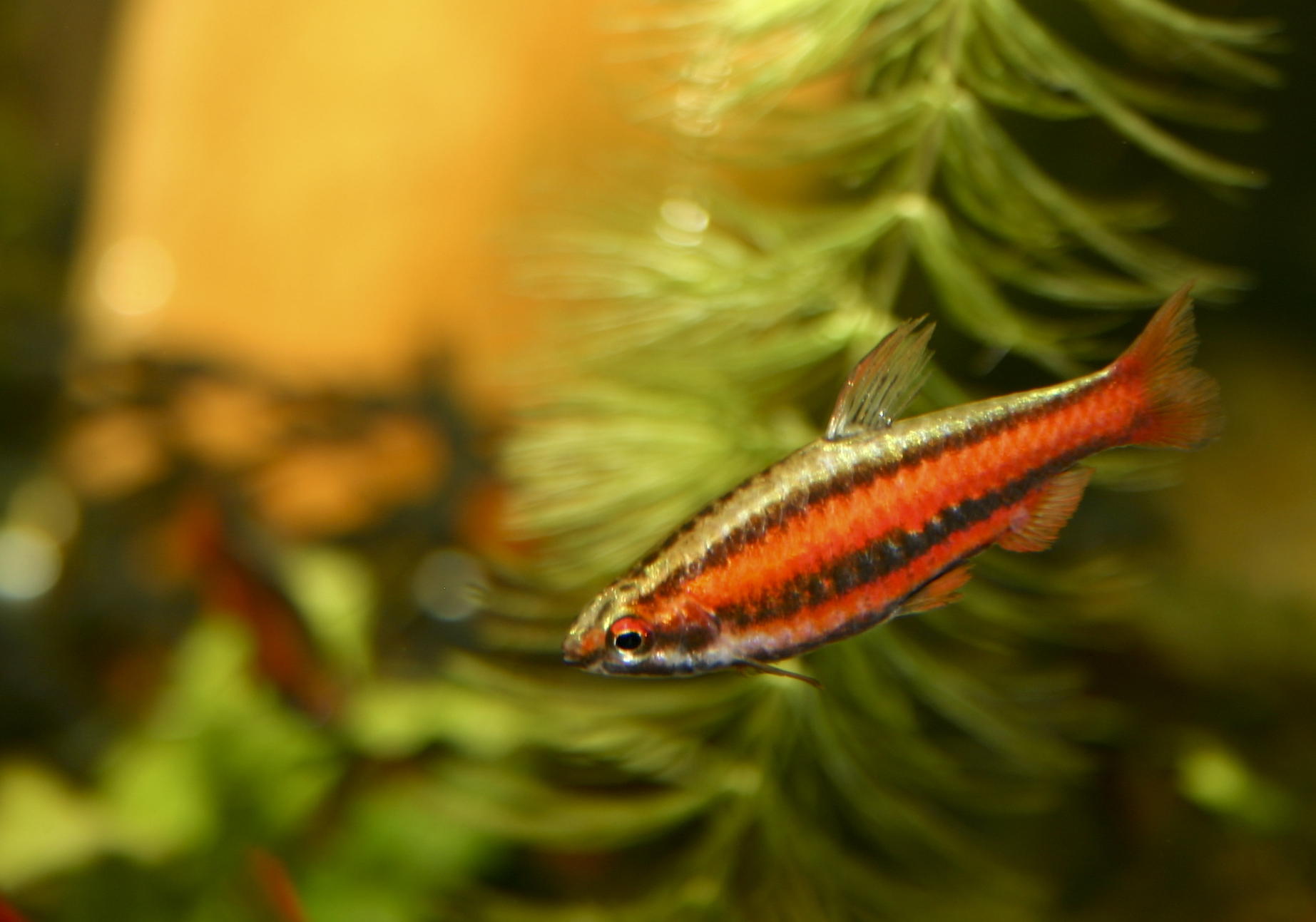

Conservation status
- Critically Endangered (IUCN 3.1)

Scientific classification
- Kingdom: Animalia
- Phylum: Chordata
- Class: Actinopterygii
- Order: Characiformes
- Family: Lebiasinidae
- Genus: Nannostomus
- Species: N. mortenthaleri

Binomial name
- Nannostomus mortenthaleri Paepke & Arendt, 2001

Synonyms
- Nannostomus marginatus mortenthaleri Paepke & Arendt, 2001

= Nannostomus mortenthaleri =

Species of fish

Nannostomus mortenthaleri, commonly known as the coral red pencilfish, is a freshwater species of characin in the family Lebiasinidae. It can be found in the aquarium trade.

== Taxonomy ==
The coral red pencilfish was originally described as a subspecies of the dwarf pencilfish (Nannostomus marginatus), but it is now recognized as a species in its own right. It was named in honor of aquarium-fish exporter Martin Mortenthaler (1961–2018), the owner of Aquarium Rio Momon SRL in Iquitos, Peru, who collected the type specimen.

== Description ==
The coral red pencilfish is one of the most colorful of its genus, being suffused with a bright coral red coloration over its entire body and fins, in striking contrast to the jet black stripes. The maximum length is 2.9 cm (1.1 in), and mature males have a thickened anal fin.

== Distribution ==
The known distribution of the coral red pencilfish is fairly restricted: it has only been recorded from a small tributary of the Nanay River, and possibly also from the Tigre River. Both of these rivers are in Peru.
