= Nannostomus grandis =

Conservation status
- Data Deficient (IUCN 3.1)

Scientific classification
- Kingdom: Animalia
- Phylum: Chordata
- Class: Actinopterygii
- Order: Characiformes
- Family: Lebiasinidae
- Genus: Nannostomus
- Species: N. grandis

Binomial name
- Nannostomus grandis Zarske, 2011

Species of fish

Nannostomus grandis is a freshwater species of fish belonging to the characin family Lebiasinidae. This species is closely related to Nannostomus beckfordi, being somewhat similar in coloration, but with a more elongated body. It has been described as the largest member of the genus; however, N. harrisoni consistently reaches a mature length in excess of 60 mm (2.4 in) and is the more likely claimant for that distinction. It was only recently formally described by Zarske, although the author reports it probably had been assumed to be a form of N. beckfordi in the past and had even been exported for the aquarium trade at times. It is native to Brazil and currently has no accepted common name.
