= P. laeta =

P. laeta may refer to:

- Paramarpissa laeta, a jumping spider
- Pavetta laeta, a plant with white flowers
- Periploca laeta, a North American moth
- Pholis laeta, an elongated fish
- Physocephala laeta, a thick-headed fly
- Potentilla laeta, a perennial plant
- Pselliophora laeta, a crane fly
- Pseudorinympha laeta, an ermine moth
- Ptosima laeta, a jewel beetle
- Pyrrhospora laeta, a lichenized fungus
- Pyrrhulina laeta, a South American fish
