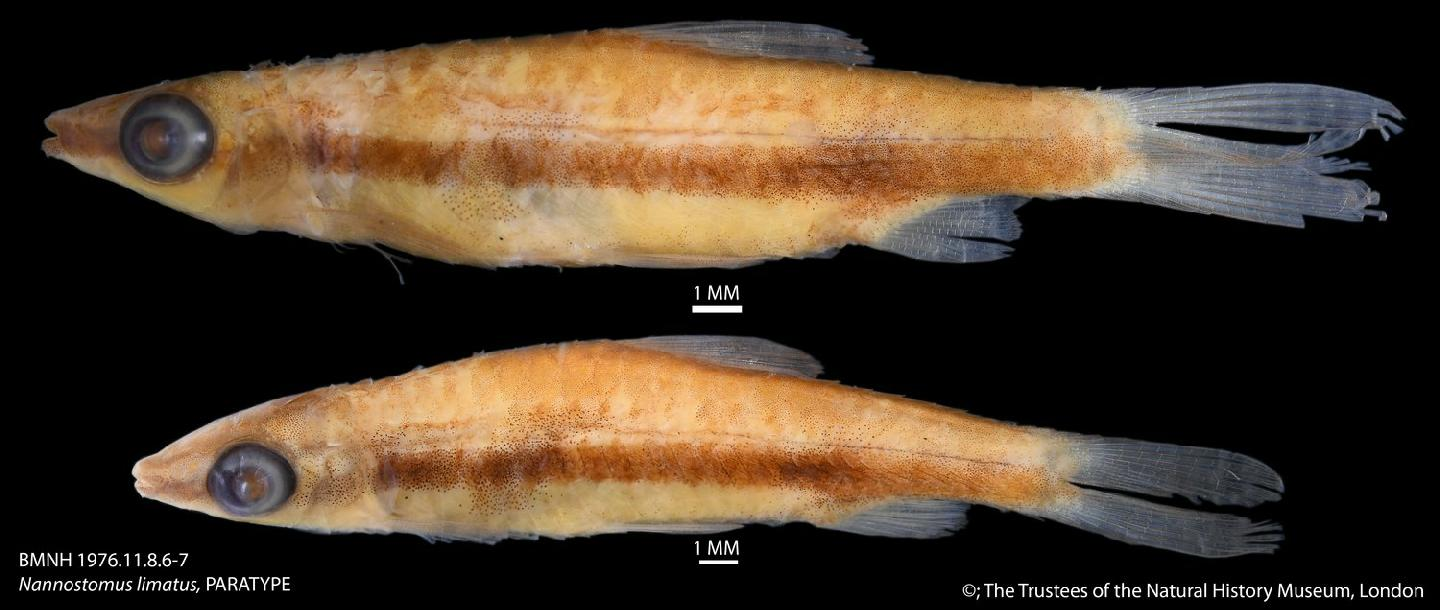

Conservation status
- Least Concern (IUCN 3.1)

Scientific classification
- Kingdom: Animalia
- Phylum: Chordata
- Class: Actinopterygii
- Order: Characiformes
- Family: Lebiasinidae
- Genus: Nannostomus
- Species: N. limatus

Binomial name
- Nannostomus limatus S. H. Weitzman, 1978

= Nannostomus limatus =

Species of fish

Nannostomus limatus (from the Greek: nanos = small, and the Latin stomus = relating to the mouth; from the Latin: limatus = elegant), commonly known as the elegant pencilfish, is a freshwater species of fish belonging to the characin family Lebiasinidae.

This fish was first described in 1978 by Stanley H. Weitzman, along with two other new species (Nannostomus britskii and Nannostomus nitidus), from a collection of specimens preserved in the São Paulo museum. Only rarely imported and kept by aquarists, they have been recorded from the Amazonian region of Brazil, specifically near Santarém.
