= Pyrrhulina maxima =

Conservation status
- Data Deficient (IUCN 3.1)

Scientific classification
- Kingdom: Animalia
- Phylum: Chordata
- Class: Actinopterygii
- Order: Characiformes
- Family: Lebiasinidae
- Genus: Pyrrhulina
- Species: P. maxima

Binomial name
- Pyrrhulina maxima C. H. Eigenmann & R. S. Eigenmann, 1889

Species of fish

Pyrrhulina maxima is a species of freshwater ray-finned fish belonging to the family Lebiasinidae, which includes the pencilfishes, splash tetras and related fishes. This fish is found in South America in the upper Amazon River.

== Size ==
This species reaches a length of 8.0 cm (3.1 in).

== Etymology ==
The fish's name is Latin for "large" or "great", referring to a larger size compared with the "closely related" P. brevis and P. (Copella) nattereri.
