= Pyrrhulina zigzag =

Conservation status
- Least Concern (IUCN 3.1)

Scientific classification
- Kingdom: Animalia
- Phylum: Chordata
- Class: Actinopterygii
- Order: Characiformes
- Family: Lebiasinidae
- Genus: Pyrrhulina
- Species: P. zigzag

Binomial name
- Pyrrhulina zigzag Zarske & Géry, 2001

Species of fish

Pyrrhulina zigzag is a species of freshwater ray-finned fish belonging to the family Lebiasinidae, which includes the pencilfishes, splash tetras and related fishes. This fish is found in the upper Amazon basin. They grow no more than 3.5 cm (1.4 in).
