= Nannostomus harrisoni =

Harrison's pencilfish

Conservation status
- Least Concern (IUCN 3.1)

Scientific classification
- Kingdom: Animalia
- Phylum: Chordata
- Class: Actinopterygii
- Order: Characiformes
- Family: Lebiasinidae
- Genus: Nannostomus
- Species: N. harrisoni

Binomial name
- Nannostomus harrisoni (C. H. Eigenmann, 1909)

Species of fish

Nannostomus harrisoni (from the Greek: nanos = small, and the Latin stomus = relating to the mouth; harrisoni = in honor of geologist John Burchmore Harrison), is a species of pencil fish.

Native to the Guianas, the species displays a single horizontal stripe of intense black, and blood red adornments on its fins.

N. harrisoni is often confused with Nannostomus unifasciatus, another long, slender, single-striped species with similar profile and coloration, but N. harrisoni swims in a horizontal posture, as opposed to the snout-up oblique posture of N. unifasciatus. The bright red adornments on the ventral fins of N. harrisoni are absent in N. unifasciatus.

Though the recently described species N. grandis has been dubbed the largest member of the genus, adults of N. harrisoni commonly grow to a length of 70 mm (2.8 in), making it in fact the largest species of pencil fish described to date. It is commonly known as Harrison's pencilfish.

The fish is named in honor of John Burchmore Harrison (1856-1928), a government geologist in Georgetown, British Guiana, for his assistance during Eigenmann's 1908 expedition to the region.
