= Copella eigenmanni =

Conservation status
- Least Concern (IUCN 3.1)

Scientific classification
- Kingdom: Animalia
- Phylum: Chordata
- Class: Actinopterygii
- Order: Characiformes
- Family: Lebiasinidae
- Genus: Copella
- Species: C. eigenmanni

Binomial name
- Copella eigenmanni Regan, 1912

Synonyms
- Copella metae C. H. Eigenmann, 1914

Species of fish

Copella eigenmanni, the red-spotted copella, is a species of freshwater ray-finned fish belonging to the family Lebiasinidae, the pencilfishes, splashing tetras and related fishes. This species is found along the Atlantic coast between Pará to Delta Amacuro, the mouth of the Orinoco. They grow no more than a few centimeters.

The fish is named in honor of ichthyologist Carl H. Eigenmann (1863-1927), who collected the type specimen.
