= Copeina osgoodi =

Conservation status
- Data Deficient (IUCN 3.1)

Scientific classification
- Kingdom: Animalia
- Phylum: Chordata
- Class: Actinopterygii
- Order: Characiformes
- Family: Lebiasinidae
- Genus: Copeina
- Species: C. osgoodi

Binomial name
- Copeina osgoodi C. H. Eigenmann, 1922

Species of fish

Copeina osgoodi is a species of freshwater ray-finned fish belonging to the family Lebiasinidae, the pencifishes, splashing tetras and related fishes. This species is found in the upper Amazon basin. They grow up to 5.1 centimetres (2.0 in).

The fish is named in honor of zoologist William Hudson Osgood (1875-1947) of the Field Museum of Natural History in Chicago, who collected the type specimen.
