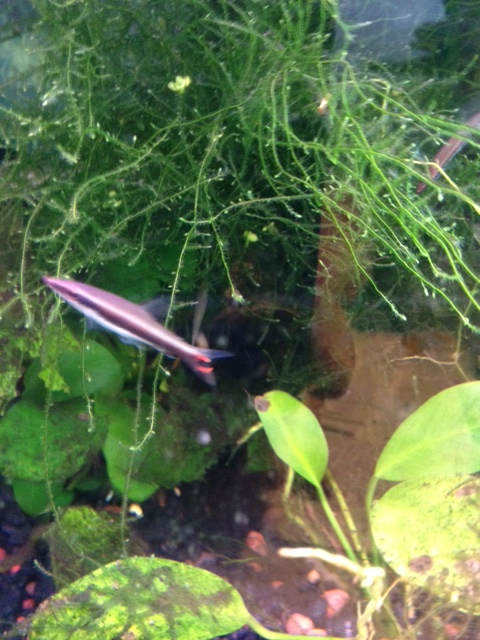
- Nannostomus unifasciatus

Conservation status
- Least Concern (IUCN 3.1)

Scientific classification
- Kingdom: Animalia
- Phylum: Chordata
- Class: Actinopterygii
- Division: Teleostei
- Order: Characiformes
- Family: Lebiasinidae
- Genus: Nannostomus
- Species: N. unifasciatus

Binomial name
- Nannostomus unifasciatus Steindachner, 1876

= Nannostomus unifasciatus =

One-lined pencilfish

Species of fish

Nannostomus unifasciatus (from the Greek nanos, meaning 'small', and the Latin stomus, relating to the mouth; the Latin unifasciatus = 'one band'), commonly known as the one-lined pencilfish, is a freshwater species of fish belonging to the genus Nannostomus in the characin family Lebiasinidae. They are popular in the aquarium trade due to their small size, beautiful color pattern, unique swimming posture and relative hardiness. With its long, pencil-shaped profile, its single jet black stripe reminiscent of the graphite core of a pencil, and its eraser-colored caudal fin, this is the species for which the popular name, 'pencilfish', was first coined in the 1920s, later to be applied to all the species of the genus Nannostomus.

== Taxonomy and distribution ==
Steindachner first described the species in 1876, making it the second of what are now nineteen species in the genus to be described. The taxonomy for the entire genus was for many decades the subject of heated debate, resulting in numerous conflicting revisions, leaving the genus for long periods in a state which has been aptly described as 'chaotic.' N. unifasciatus was often at the center of this controversy, for several reasons. N. unifasciatus is broadly distributed throughout the Amazon basin, Brazil, the Guiana Shield, Colombia, Venezuela, and northern Bolivia. As a result, the species is polychromatic, with many geographic populations manifesting subtle differences in color pattern. Over the years, some of these color morphs have been erroneously described as separate species. Further taxonomic confusion arose when various authors erected other genera for Nannostomus unifasciatus and its congeners, Nannostomus eques and Nannostomus harrisoni. Confounding the situation still further, Dutch naturalist J. J. Hoedeman published a paper in The Amsterdam Naturalist in 1950 that put forth that N. unifasciatus and N. eques were the same species. Consensus was finally achieved when, in his seminal paper on the genus Nannostomus in 1975, Dr. Stanley Howard Weitzman restored Steindachner's taxonomy and expanded upon it, reaffirming the status of N. unifasciatus and N. eques as distinct and individuated species, and placing N. unifasciatus and all of its congeners in one genus, Nannostomus. As a result, Poecilobrycon ocellatus, Nannobrycon unifasciatus, and similar epithets formerly applied to the species, are now relegated to junior synonyms to N. unifasciatus.

A population of the species has been discovered on the island of Trinidad, but it is believed to have been introduced.

== Habitat ==
Nannostomus unifasciatus commonly inhabits slow-moving tributaries, small rivers, and swampy areas throughout its substantial range. Dense aquatic vegetation and/or submerged branches and leaf litter are most often present. They also congregate beneath floating islands. Water parameters invariably range from slightly acidic (pH 6.5) to strongly acidic (pH 4.0) with negligible hardness.

Their congener, N. eques, is often found associated with them nearby, along with numerous other species of small characins.

== Description ==
Though the one-lined pencilfish is a small fish, with adults not reaching more than 7 cm (2.8 in) in length, it is nevertheless one of the largest species of Nannostomus. It is a long, slender species with a small terminal mouth and an adipose fin. It has one black longitudinal stripe that runs the length of the body and onto the caudal fin. The single black stripe is bordered above by a thin metallic gold band. The caudal fin is colored variously, depending on the geographic population. Most forms have red or orange pigment of varying intensity in the lower quadrant of the caudal fin, ventral to the black stripe. In some especially colorful populations, the red pigment extends above the black stripe as well, as pictured above. The Guyanese population, as well as one form from Bolivia, manifest a well-defined caudal ocellus above the black stripe. The ventral and anal fins are usually tipped with an enamel blue-white. N. unifasicatus is one of two species of Nannostomus, the other being Nannostomus eques, that postures itself at an oblique, snout-up angle. Because of this similarity, N. unifasciatus and N. eques have often been confused in aquarium literature, though they are colored entirely differently. Nannostomus harrisoni, another long, slender single-striped species, is also often confused with N. unifasciatus based on a similar profile and coloration, but N. harrisoni swims in a horizontal posture and possesses bright red adornments on its anal and ventral fins, absent in N. unifasciatus.

== Sexual dimorphism ==
Sexual dimorphism in this species is typical of many species in the genus Nannostomus. The anal fin of males is modified in shape in most populations, with the male's fin being slightly elongated. It is the least evident in the Guyanese population. The white tips of the ventral and anal fins are invariably brighter and more prominent in males. Males are also usually slimmer in profile.

== Diet ==
Nannostomus unifasciatus is omnivorous and feeds primarily on insects and small crustaceans. It is also an avid periphyton grazer, ingesting microorganisms as well as algae.

== In the aquarium ==
Though it has gone through periodic episodes of scarcity in the aquarium trade, N. unifasciatus has long been considered a most desirable aquarium species, Dr. William T. Innes describing them as possessing "a marked elegance" and manifesting "that indefinable something known as class" in 1935. It is an appropriate community aquarium species, if tankmates are of similar size and demeanor, and will thrive if kept in soft, mildly acidic water with low nitrate levels, and at temperatures between 72F and 82F. Baby brine shrimp and other small-sized foods are indicated. Males will establish and defend small territories. Unlike its congener, N. eques, which prefers the upper strata of the aquarium, N. unifasciatus tends to congregate in the middle to lower reaches.

This is the only species of Nannostomus in the aquarium trade for which there is no recorded account of a successful spawning in captivity to date, despite it being a widely kept and much admired aquarium species since the 1920s. Two reports of purported successful spawnings in the 1950s, published in aquarium literature—one in the Belgian magazine Notre Aquarium, and the other in the American magazine The Aquarium —involved misidentification of the species, the spawnings having occurred for N. eques and N. harrisoni respectively, not N. unifasciatus.
