= Copeina guttata =

Conservation status
- Least Concern (IUCN 3.1)

Scientific classification
- Kingdom: Animalia
- Phylum: Chordata
- Class: Actinopterygii
- Order: Characiformes
- Family: Lebiasinidae
- Genus: Copeina
- Species: C. guttata

Binomial name
- Copeina guttata (Steindachner, 1876)

Synonyms
- Pyrrhulina guttata Steindachner, 1876; Pyrrhulina argrops Cope, 1878

Species of fish

Copeina guttata, the red-spotted tetra or red spotted copeina, is a species of freshwater ray-finned fish belonging to the family Lebiasinidae, the pencifishes, splashing tetras and related fishes. This fish is found in the middle part of the Amazon basin in Brazil, Colombia and Peru. It has a maximum standard length of 7.6 cm (3.0 in).
