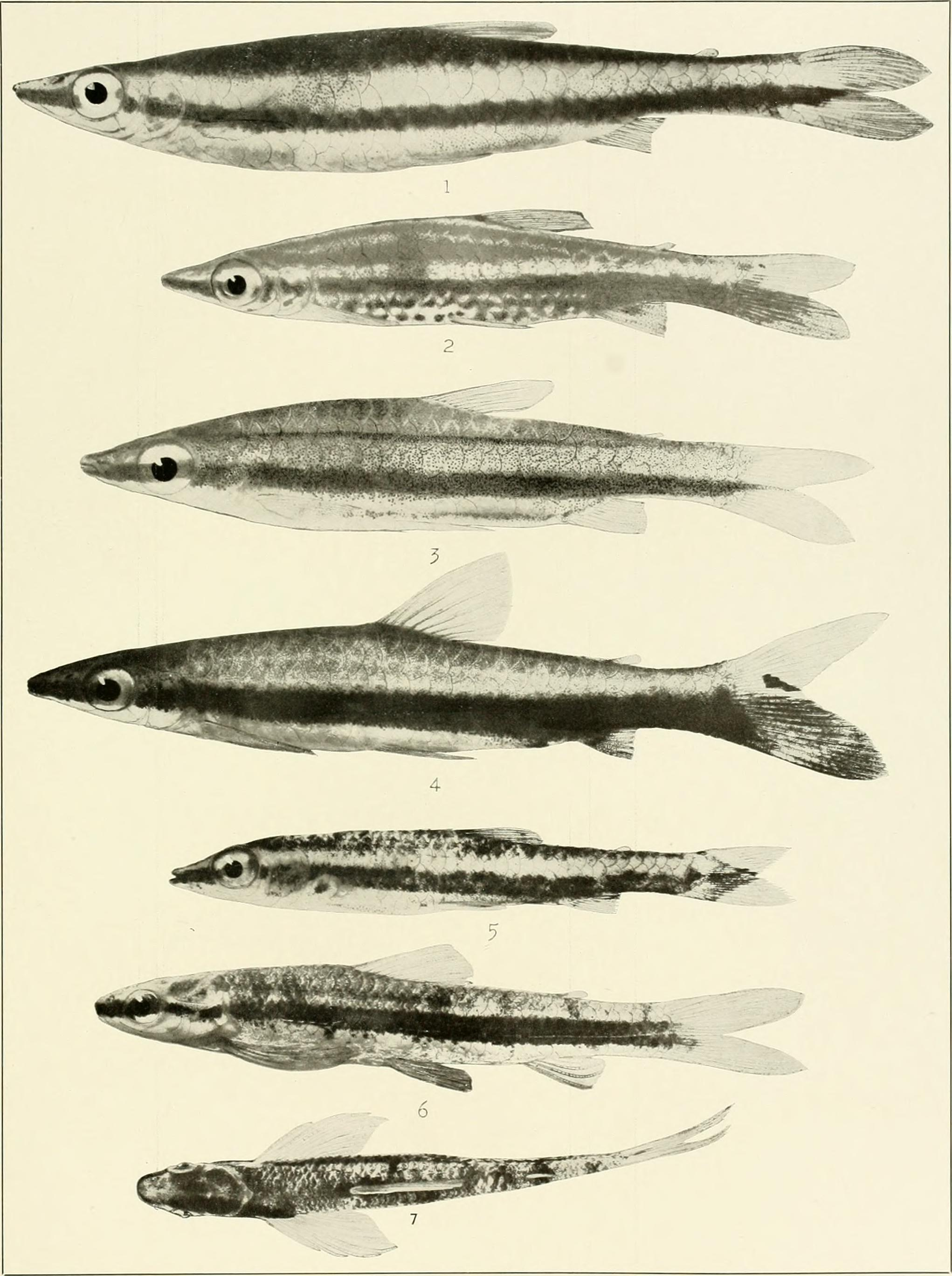
- A two-lined pencilfish (top) amidst other characin species

Conservation status
- Least Concern (IUCN 3.1)

Scientific classification
- Kingdom: Animalia
- Phylum: Chordata
- Class: Actinopterygii
- Order: Characiformes
- Family: Lebiasinidae
- Genus: Nannostomus
- Species: N. bifasciatus

Binomial name
- Nannostomus bifasciatus Hoedeman, 1954

= Nannostomus bifasciatus =

Two-lined pencilfish

Species of fish

Nannostomus bifasciatus, the twolined pencilfishor whiteside pencilfish, is a species of freshwater ray-finned fish belonging to the family Lebiasinidae, the pencilfishes, splashing tetras and related fishes. This species is found in Amapá in Brazil, in French Guiana, and in Suriname.

== Taxonomy ==
Nannostomus bifasciatus was first formally described in 1954 by the Dutch ichthyologist and aquarist Jacobus Johannes Hoedeman, with its type locality given as Berg en Dal at the Suriname River in Suriname.

This species is classified in the genus Nannostomus, and has been placed within the monotypic tribe Nannostomomini, a clade proposed by Carl H. Eigenmann in 1909, of the subfamily Pyrrhulininae in the family Lebiasinidae within the suborder Characoidei of the order Characiformes.

== Etymology ==
Nannostomus bifasciatus is classified in the genus Nannostomus. This name combines the Greek nannos, which means "dwarf", with stome, meaning "mouth", an allusion to the narrow mouth of this species. The specific name, bifasciatus, means "twice banded", an allusion which Hoedeman did not explain, but which may refer to the bands along the flanks of this fish.
