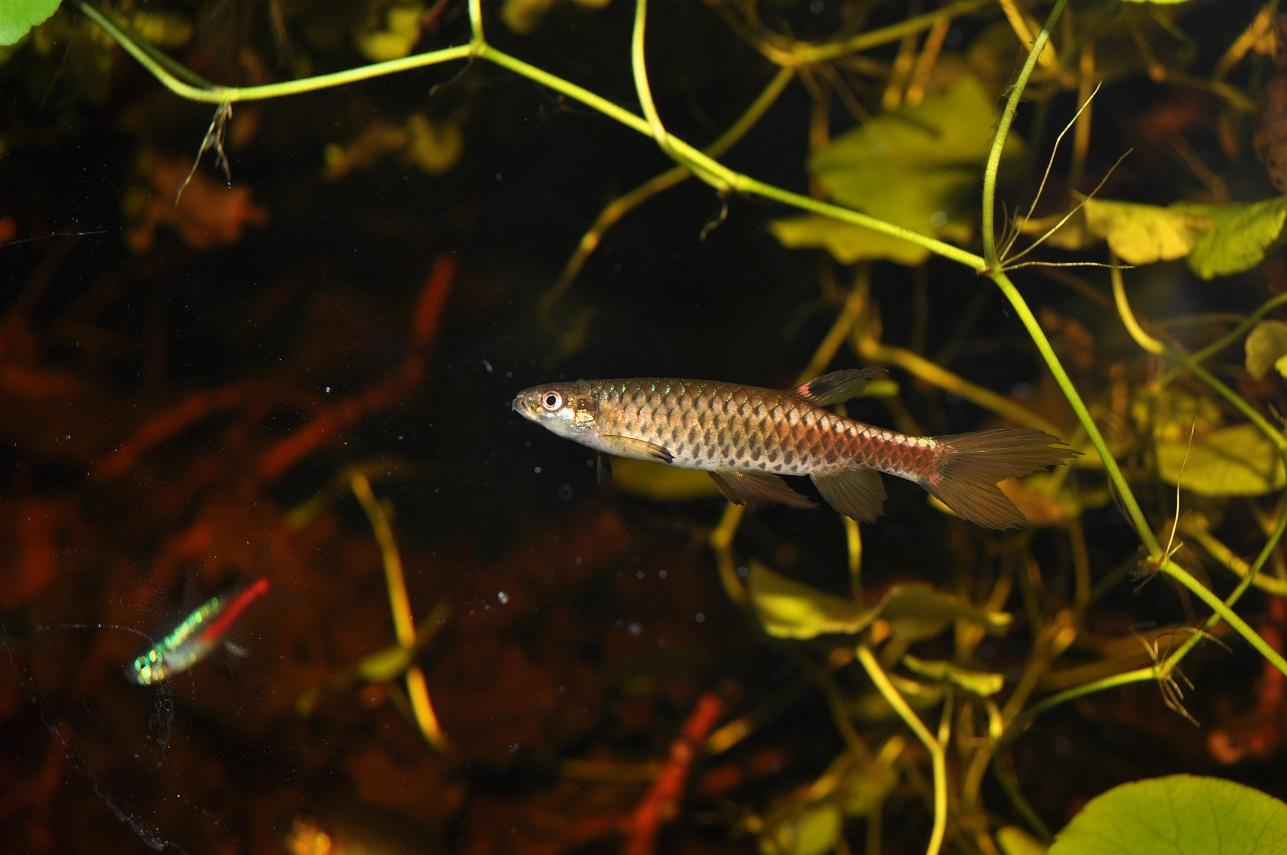

Conservation status
- Least Concern (IUCN 3.1)

Scientific classification
- Kingdom: Animalia
- Phylum: Chordata
- Class: Actinopterygii
- Order: Characiformes
- Family: Lebiasinidae
- Genus: Copella
- Species: C. compta

Binomial name
- Copella compta G. S. Myers, 1927

= Copella compta =

Species of fish

Copella compta is a species of freshwater ray-finned fish belonging to the family Lebiasinidae, the pencilfishes, splashing tetras and related fishes. This species is found in the upper Rio Negro basin, as well as the Orinoco Basin. They grow no more than a few centimeters.
