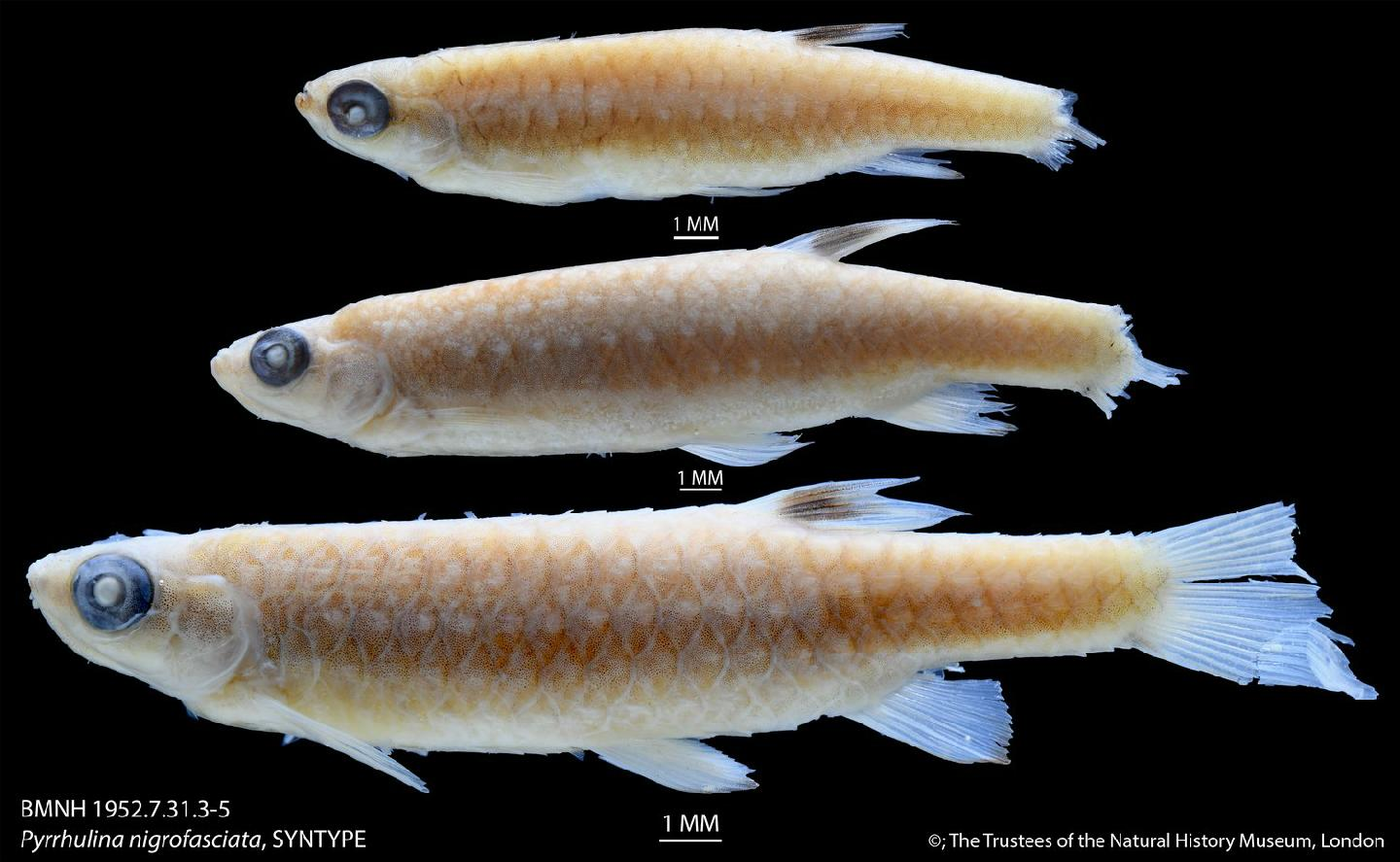

Conservation status
- Least Concern (IUCN 3.1)

Scientific classification
- Kingdom: Animalia
- Phylum: Chordata
- Class: Actinopterygii
- Order: Characiformes
- Family: Lebiasinidae
- Genus: Copella
- Species: C. callolepis

Binomial name
- Copella callolepis (Regan, 1912)

Synonyms
- Copeina callolepis Regan, 1912; Pyrrhulina nigrofasciata Meinken, 1952; Copella nigrofasciata (Meinken, 1952)

= Copella callolepis =

Species of fish

Copella callolepis is a species of freshwater ray-finned fish belonging to the family Lebiasinidae, the pencilfishes, splashing tetras and related fishes. This species is found in South America.
