= Nannostomus digrammus =

Twostripe pencilfish

Conservation status
- Least Concern (IUCN 3.1)

Scientific classification
- Kingdom: Animalia
- Phylum: Chordata
- Class: Actinopterygii
- Order: Characiformes
- Family: Lebiasinidae
- Genus: Nannostomus
- Species: N. digrammus

Binomial name
- Nannostomus digrammus Fowler, 1913

Species of fish

Nannostomus digrammus (from the Greek nanos, meaning "small", the Latin stomus, relating to the mouth; and the Latin digrammus, meaning "two lines"), commonly known as the twostripe pencilfish, is a freshwater species of fish belonging to the characin family Lebiasinidae.

They were first described in 1913 by Henry Weed Fowler, and are fairly typical of members of this genus, being small, elongated fish with prominent horizontal stripes, in this case limited to two dominant stripes, usually maroon in color.

They are recorded as native to Brazil and Guyana, where they occur fairly widely, but are seen only occasionally in the aquarium trade.
