= Pyrrhulina eleanorae =

Conservation status
- Least Concern (IUCN 3.1)

Scientific classification
- Kingdom: Animalia
- Phylum: Chordata
- Class: Actinopterygii
- Order: Characiformes
- Family: Lebiasinidae
- Genus: Pyrrhulina
- Species: P. eleanorae

Binomial name
- Pyrrhulina eleanorae Fowler, 1940

Species of fish

Pyrrhulina eleanorae is a species of freshwater ray-finned fish belonging to the family Lebiasinidae, which includes the pencilfishes, splash tetras and related fishes. This species is found in the upper Amazon basin. They grow no more than a few centimeters.

== Etymology ==
Fish named in honor of Eleanor Morrow, the wife of William C. Morrow, who was the leader of the Peruvian expedition that collected the type specimen.
