= Derhamia =

Conservation status
- Vulnerable (IUCN 3.1)

Scientific classification
- Kingdom: Animalia
- Phylum: Chordata
- Class: Actinopterygii
- Division: Teleostei
- Order: Characiformes
- Family: Lebiasinidae
- Subfamily: Lebiasininae
- Genus: Derhamia; Géry & Zarske, 2002
- Species: D. hoffmannorum

Binomial name
- Derhamia hoffmannorum Géry & Zarske, 2002

Species of fish

Derhamia is a monospecific genus of freshwater ray-finned fish belonging to the family Lebiasinidae, the pencifishes, splashing tetras and related fishes. The only species in the genus is Derhamia hoffmannorum, a species which is endemic to Guyana, where it is found in the Mazaruni River. It is found in fresh water at pelagic depths in a tropical climate. The average length of an unsexed male is about 6.1 cm (2.4 in). It has an elongated body with large eyes. It is a timid species compared to other similar species such as the various pencilfish. They live near the surface of water and are known to hide whenever possible, usually under floating objects. This species only eats what can be found at the surface, as well. D. hoffmannorum will not seek food that sinks to the bottom.

The generic name honours Patrick de Rham, Swiss ichthyologist and aquarist (1936–2022), who collected the holotype specimens in the wild. The specific epithet is in honor of Peter Hoffman and Martin Hoffman (Salzgitter and Hanover, Germany, respectively), who acclimated other specimens to captivity, giving authors additional information about its biology that could not have been known by studying them in the wild.
