= Pyrrhulina elongata =

Conservation status
- Least Concern (IUCN 3.1)

Scientific classification
- Kingdom: Animalia
- Phylum: Chordata
- Class: Actinopterygii
- Order: Characiformes
- Family: Lebiasinidae
- Genus: Pyrrhulina
- Species: P. elongata

Binomial name
- Pyrrhulina elongata Zarske & Géry, 2001

Species of fish

Pyrrhulina elongata is a species of freshwater ray-finned fish belonging to the family Lebiasinidae, which includes the pencilfishes, splash tetras and related fishes. This species is found in the Amazon basin, specifically within the Tapajós basin, in creeks and in small ponds. They grow no more than 3.7 centimetres (1.5 in).
