= Pyrrhulina rachoviana =

Conservation status
- Least Concern (IUCN 3.1)

Scientific classification
- Kingdom: Animalia
- Phylum: Chordata
- Class: Actinopterygii
- Order: Characiformes
- Family: Lebiasinidae
- Genus: Pyrrhulina
- Species: P. rachoviana

Binomial name
- Pyrrhulina rachoviana G. S. Myers, 1926

Species of fish

Pyrrhulina rachoviana is a species of freshwater ray-finned fish belonging to the family Lebiasinidae, which includes the pencilfishes, splash tetras and related fishes. This species has a specific name which honours the German aquarist Arthur Rachow. The type locality is Rosario, Argentina. A species is sold in the aquarium trade under the name Pyrrhulina rachoviana, but was probably imported from Brazil, not Argentina.
