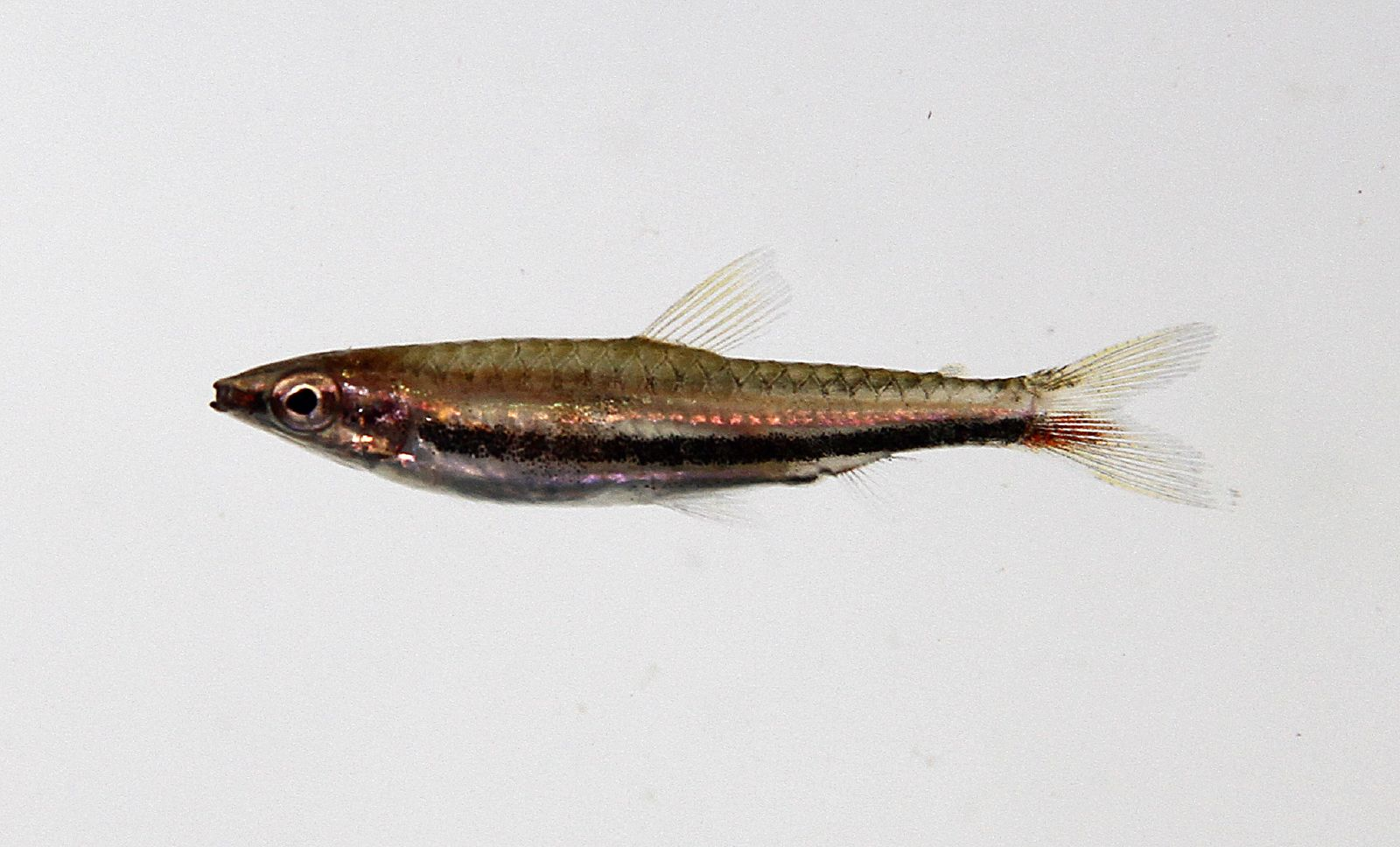

Conservation status
- Least Concern (IUCN 3.1)

Scientific classification
- Kingdom: Animalia
- Phylum: Chordata
- Class: Actinopterygii
- Order: Characiformes
- Family: Lebiasinidae
- Genus: Nannostomus
- Species: N. marilynae

Binomial name
- Nannostomus marilynae S. H. Weitzman & Cobb, 1975

= Nannostomus marilynae =

Species of fish

Nannostomus marilynae (from the Greek nanos, meaning "small", and the Latin stomus, relating to the mouth; marilynae in honor of ichthyologist Marilyn Weitzman), commonly known as Marilyn's or the greenstripe pencilfish, is a freshwater species of fish belonging to the characin family Lebiasinidae. They have been recorded from the Rio Negro and Rio Orinoco regions of Brazil, Venezuela, and Colombia.
