= Copella vilmae =

Conservation status
- Least Concern (IUCN 3.1)

Scientific classification
- Kingdom: Animalia
- Phylum: Chordata
- Class: Actinopterygii
- Order: Characiformes
- Family: Lebiasinidae
- Genus: Copella
- Species: C. vilmae

Binomial name
- Copella vilmae Géry, 1963

Species of fish

Copella vilmae is a species of fish in the splashing tetra family found in the upper Amazon basin. They grow no more than a few centimeters.
