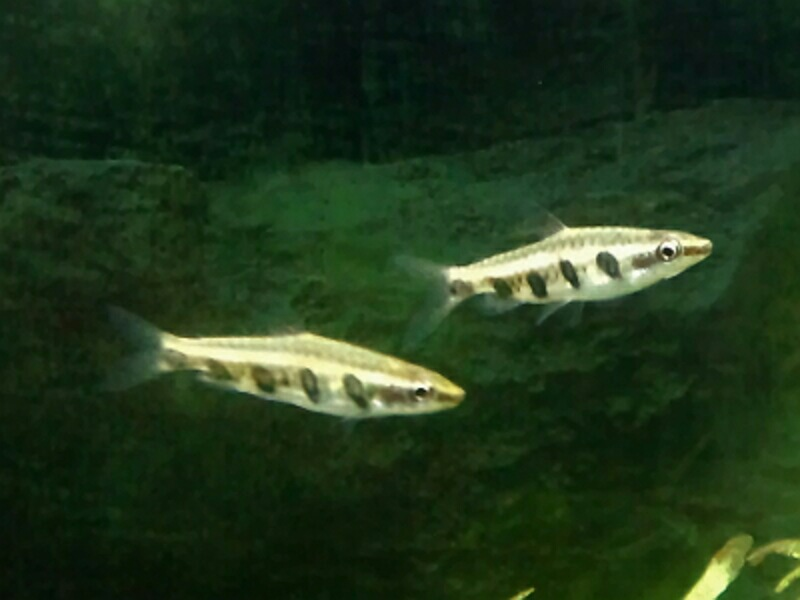

Conservation status
- Least Concern (IUCN 3.1)

Scientific classification
- Kingdom: Animalia
- Phylum: Chordata
- Class: Actinopterygii
- Order: Characiformes
- Family: Lebiasinidae
- Genus: Nannostomus
- Species: N. espei

Binomial name
- Nannostomus espei Meinken, 1956

= Nannostomus espei =

Barred pencilfish

Species of fish

Nannostomus espei (from the Greek: nanos = "small", and the Latin stomus = relating to the mouth; espei = in honor of tropical fish importer/exporter, Heinrich Espe), commonly known as Espe's pencilfish or barred pencilfish, is a freshwater species of fish belonging to the characin family Lebiasinidae.

It was first described in 1956 by Herman Meinken from the Mazaruni River system in Guyana and to date, this is its only known location.

It is notable within the genus in that the dominant body pattern consists of five broad, comma-like patches instead of the more normal horizontal stripes seen in the rest of the genus. This pattern of patches is assumed by other species at night, but only N. espei displays the pattern permanently and in daylight.

The fish is named in honor of ornamental fish importer-exporter Heinrich Espe, who furnished specimens to Meinken for identification.
