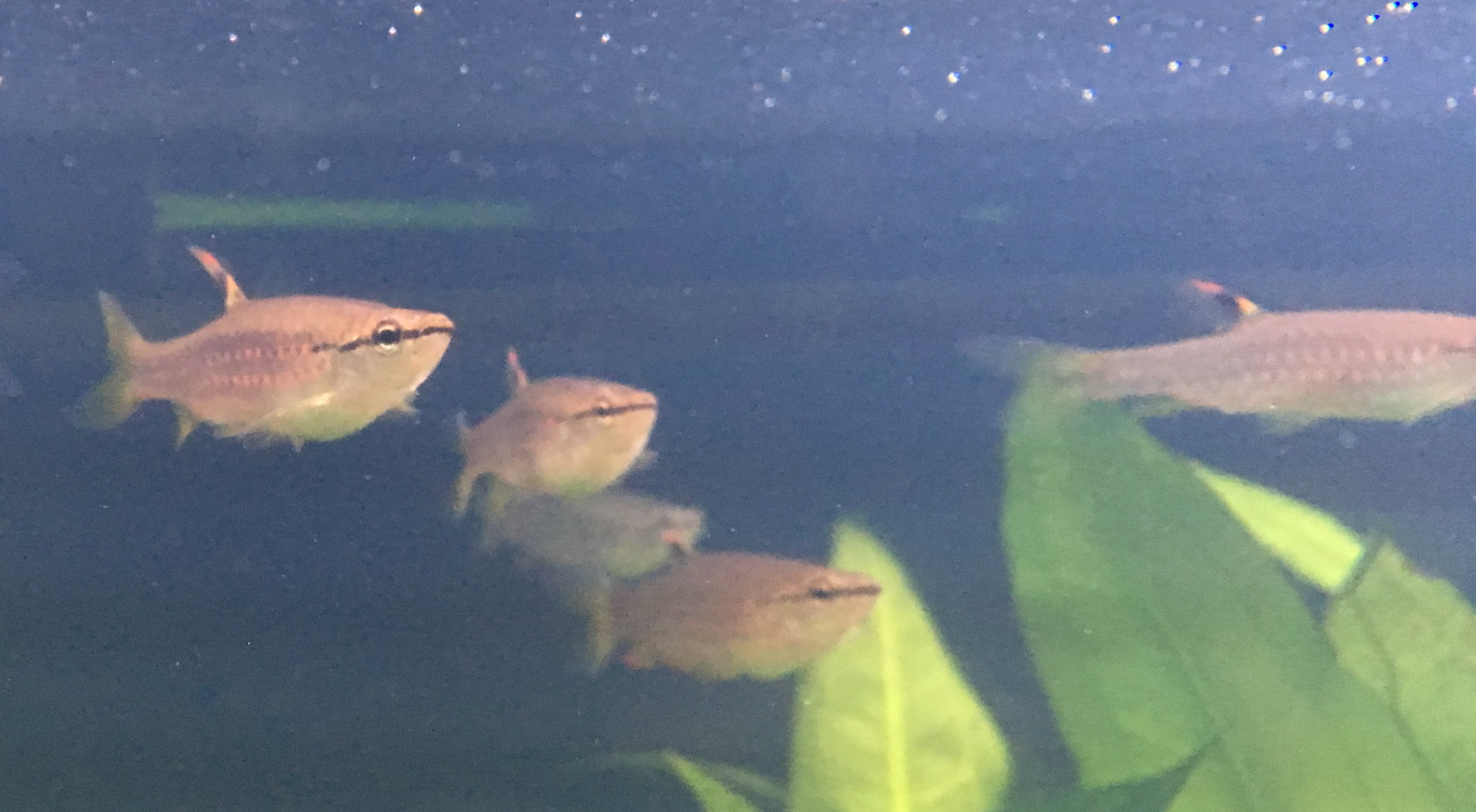

Conservation status
- Least Concern (IUCN 3.1)

Scientific classification
- Kingdom: Animalia
- Phylum: Chordata
- Class: Actinopterygii
- Order: Characiformes
- Family: Lebiasinidae
- Genus: Pyrrhulina
- Species: P. australis

Binomial name
- Pyrrhulina australis C. H. Eigenmann & C. H. Kennedy, 1903

Synonyms
- Pyrrhulina macrolepis Ahl & Otto Schindler, 1937

= Pyrrhulina australis =

Species of fish

Pyrrhulina australis is a species of freshwater ray-finned fish belonging to the family Lebiasinidae, which includes the pencilfishes, splash tetras and related fishes. The fishes in this genus are found in South America, where they occur in the La Plata and Paraguay River basins north into the Guaporé River basin.

== Size ==
This species reaches a length of 5.0 cm (2.0 in).

== Etymology ==
The fish's name is Latin for "southern", referring to its occurrence, since it is described from Paraguay, south of the "evidently closely related" P. semifasciata that inhabits the Amazon River basin.
