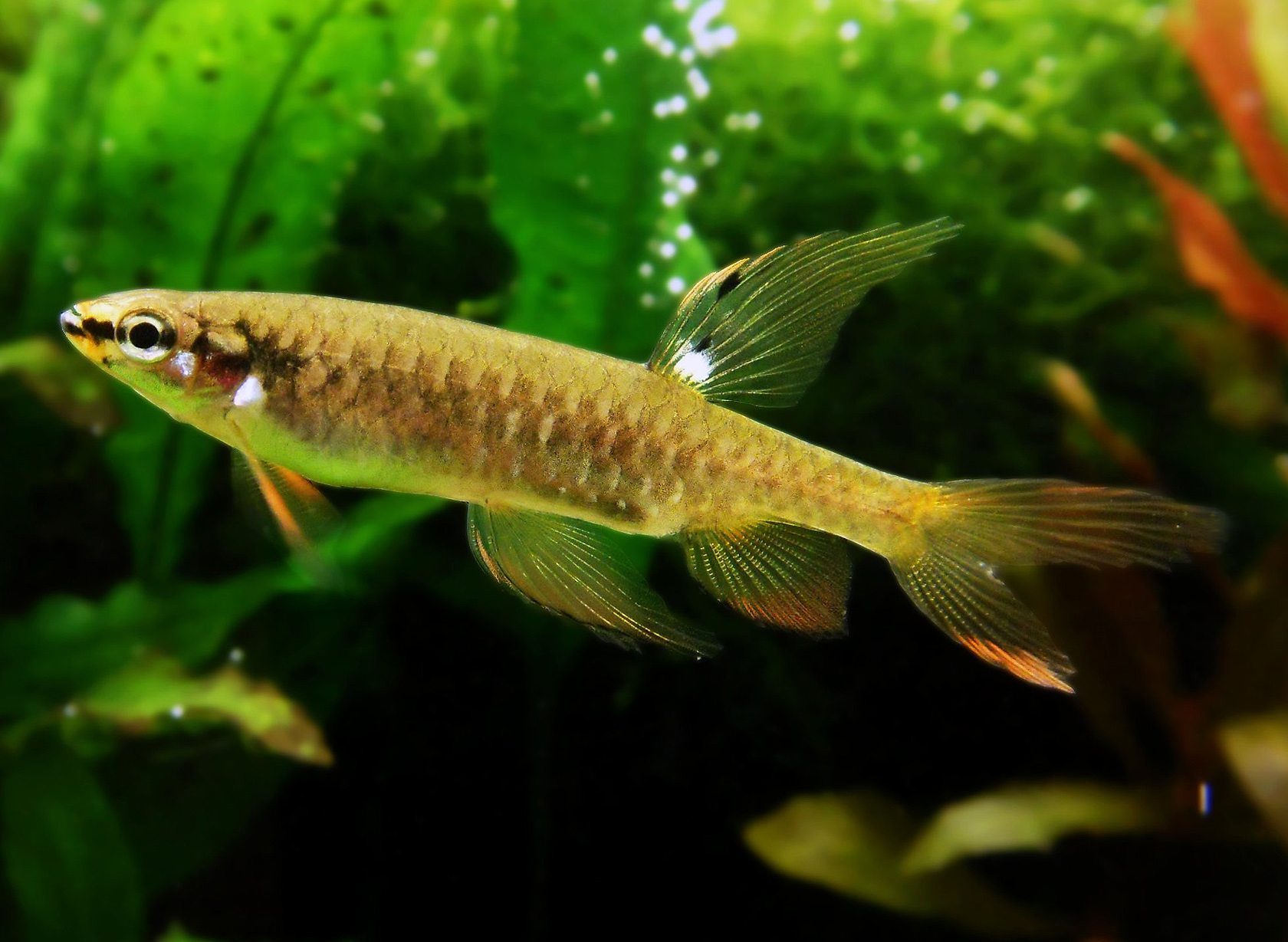

Conservation status
- Least Concern (IUCN 3.1)

Scientific classification
- Kingdom: Animalia
- Phylum: Chordata
- Class: Actinopterygii
- Order: Characiformes
- Family: Lebiasinidae
- Genus: Copella
- Species: C. arnoldi

Binomial name
- Copella arnoldi (Regan, 1912)

Synonyms
- Copeina arnoldi Regan, 1912; Copeina carsevennensis Regan, 1912; Copeella carsevennensis (Regan, 1912)

= Copella arnoldi =

Species of fish

Copella arnoldi, commonly known as the splash tetra or the splashing tetra, is a species of tropical freshwater fish belonging to the family Lebiasinidae. It is native to South America, and has been introduced to the island of Trinidad.

The fish is named in honor of German aquarist Johann Paul Arnold (1869–1952), who collected the type specimen.

== Description ==
The splash tetra is a small, slender fish with a standard length of 3 to 4 cm (1.2 to 1.6 in). The mouth is relatively large and upturned, with acutely pointed teeth; this contrasts with the more horizontal mouth of the rather similar pencil fishes (Nannostomus). The maxillary bones are curved in an S-shape and the nostrils are separated by a ridge of skin. There is a dark spot on the dorsal fin and a dark line from the snout to the eye, which may continue to the operculum. There is no lateral line and no adipose fin.

== Distribution and habitat ==
The species is endemic to tropical river basins in South America where it is present in river systems from the Orinoco to the Amazon River. It is found in shallow streams, both in clearwater forest creeks and in blackwater creeks in swamps and wetlands.

== Ecology ==
Worms, crustaceans and other invertebrates, particularly small insects that fall onto the surface of the water, make up the splash tetra's diet.

This fish has an unusual system of reproduction, with the male fish caring for the eggs. During the breeding season, the male chooses a suitable location with overhanging foliage. When he has attracted a female to this spot, the pair simultaneously leap out of the water and cling onto a low-hanging leaf with their pelvic fins for up to ten seconds. Here the female lays a batch of six to ten eggs which are immediately fertilised by the male, before both fish fall back into the water. Further batches are laid in a similar manner until there are 100 to 200 eggs on the leaf and the female is spent. The male remains close at hand, repeatedly splashing water onto the eggs to keep them damp. The rate of splashing is up to about 38 splashes per hour. The eggs hatch after some 36 to 72 hours and the fish fry fall into the water below.
