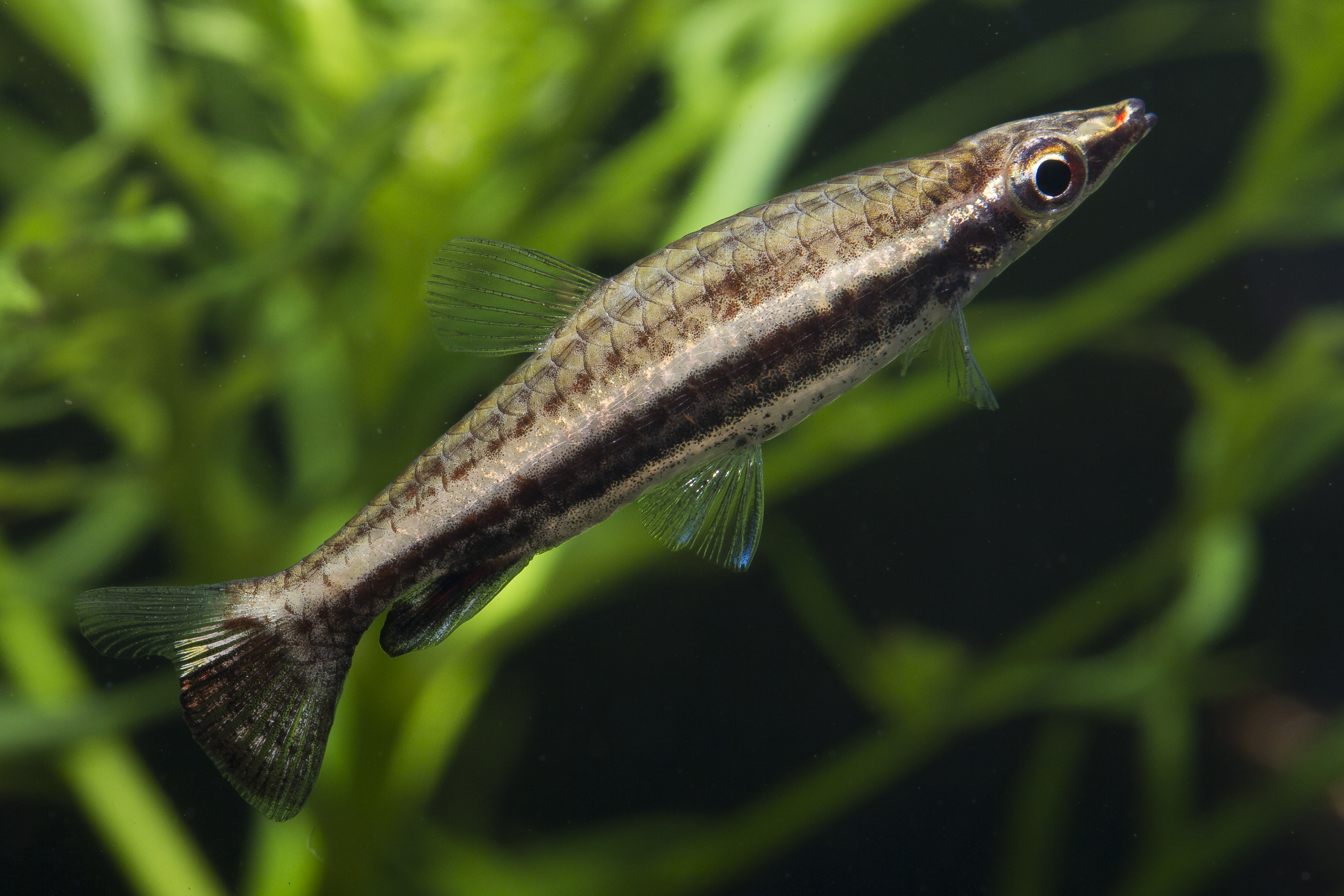

Conservation status
- Least Concern (IUCN 3.1)

Scientific classification
- Kingdom: Animalia
- Phylum: Chordata
- Class: Actinopterygii
- Order: Characiformes
- Family: Lebiasinidae
- Genus: Nannostomus
- Species: N. eques

Binomial name
- Nannostomus eques Steindachner, 1876

= Nannostomus eques =

Species of fish

Nannostomus eques (from the Greek nanos, meaning "small", the Latin stomus, relating to the mouth, and the Latin eques, meaning "horseman"), commonly known as the diptail, brown or hockey stick pencilfish, is a freshwater species of fish belonging to the characin family Lebiasinidae.

It was first described in 1876 by Franz Steindachner, making it one of the first members of the genus to be discovered and described.

It is fairly typical of members of this genus, being a small, elongated fish with prominent horizontal stripes.

It occurs quite widely in South America, having been recorded in Brazil, Peru, Colombia, and Guyana.

It is also common in the aquarium trade, where its habit of swimming and posturing at a 'snout-up' angle—one of two Nannostomus species to do so, the other being Nannostomus unifasciatus—makes it a popular choice.

A group of Nannostomus eques swimming in a freshwater aquarium, showing the characteristic oblique, 'snout-up' posture characteristic of the species
