= Pyrrhulina marilynae =

Conservation status
- Least Concern (IUCN 3.1)

Scientific classification
- Kingdom: Animalia
- Phylum: Chordata
- Class: Actinopterygii
- Order: Characiformes
- Family: Lebiasinidae
- Genus: Pyrrhulina
- Species: P. marilynae

Binomial name
- Pyrrhulina marilynae Netto-Ferreira & Marinho, 2013

Species of fish

Pyrrhulina marilynae is a species of freshwater ray-finned fish belonging to the family Lebiasinidae, which includes the pencilfishes, splash tetras and related fishes. This fish is found in the basins of the Tapajós and Xingu River. They grow to no more than a few centimeters.

== Etymology ==
The fish is named in honor of Marilyn Weitzman (b. 1926) of the Smithsonian Institution, for mentorship to both describers when they began studying the family Lebiasinidae. She is married to ichthyologist Stanley Weitzman.
