= N. marginatus =

N. marginatus may refer to:

- Nannostomus marginatus, the dwarf pencilfish, a freshwater fish species found on the South American continent
- Nicrophorus marginatus, a burying beetle species
