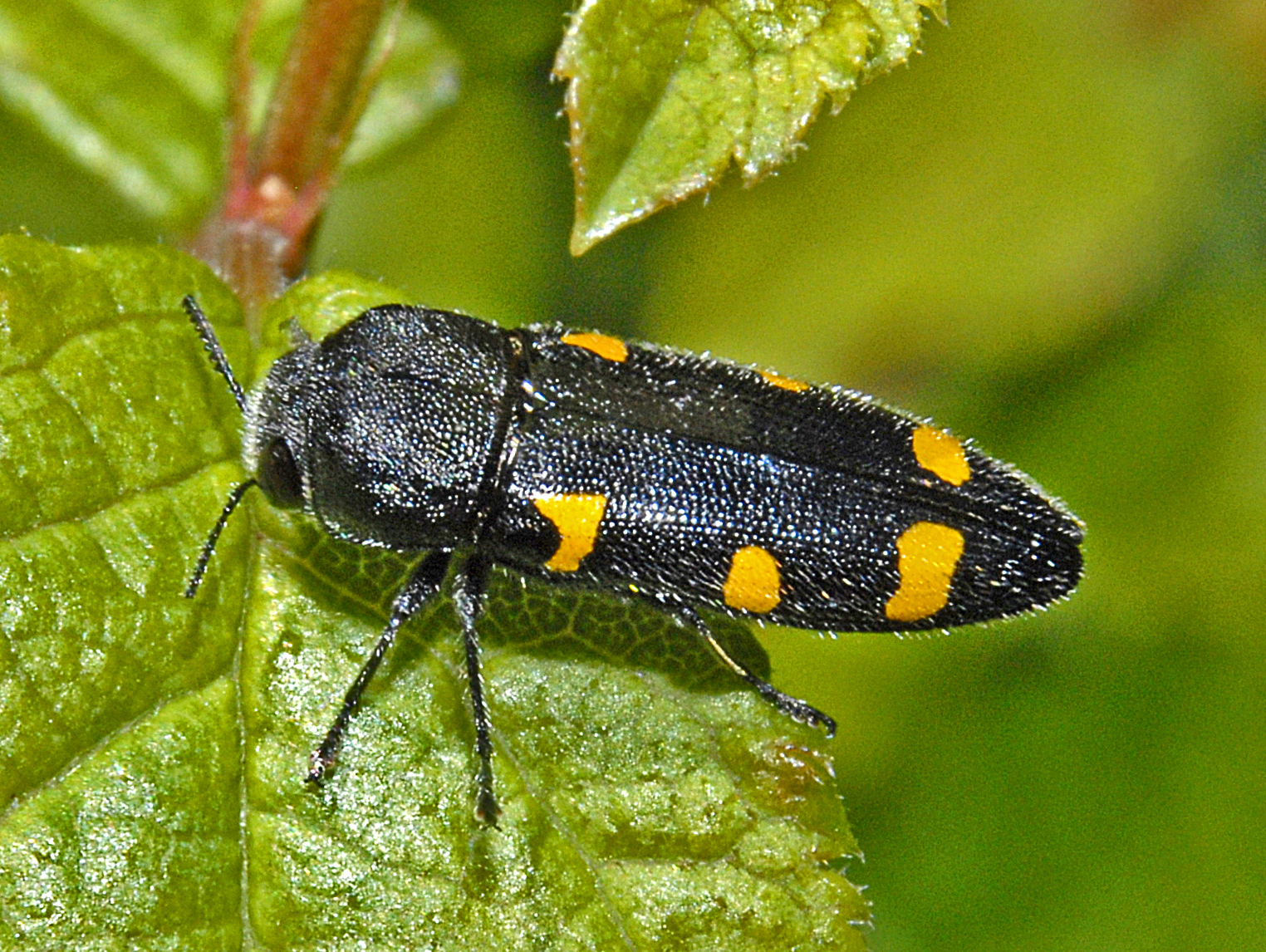
- Ptosima undecimmaculata var. sexmaculata

Scientific classification
- Kingdom: Animalia
- Phylum: Arthropoda
- Class: Insecta
- Order: Coleoptera
- Suborder: Polyphaga
- Infraorder: Elateriformia
- Family: Buprestidae
- Genus: Ptosima
- Species: P. undecimmaculata

Binomial name
- Ptosima undecimmaculata (Herbst, 1784)

Synonyms
- Buprestis flavoguttata Illiger, 1803; Buprestis istria Voet, 1806; Buprestis novemmaculata Fabricius, 1775 nec Linnaeus, 1767; Buprestis sexpunctata Villers, 1789 nec Scopoli, 1763; Buprestis undecimmaculata Herbst, 1784 o; Ptosima cyclops Marseul, 1865; Ptosima flavoguttata (Illiger, 1803); Ptosima intermedia Demaison, 1904; Ptosima pici Obenberger, 1926

= Ptosima undecimmaculata =

Species of beetle

Ptosima undecimmaculata, the splendour beetle, is a species of beetles in the family Buprestidae.

== Subspecies and varietas ==
- Ptosima undecimmaculata undecimmaculata Herbst, 1784
- Ptosima undecimmaculata metallescens Bílý, 1982
- Ptosima undecimmaculata var. sexmaculata Herbst

== Description ==
Ptosima undecimmaculata can reach a length of about 9–14 millimetres (0.35–0.55 in). The body is cylindrical and the head is much broader than long and narrower than the pronotum.

The Latin species name undecimmaculata indicates that the species should have eleven spots (lat. Undecimo = eleven, lat. Maculatus = stained). Normally the number of spots is different than eleven. This is due to the variety of spots in number, arrangement and form.

Pronotum is black, with longitudinal stripes of rugosity. Elytra are black with three pairs of lateral, yellowish-orange or reddish transverse markings, frequently with preapical maculae. Frons and pronotal disc occasionally may have maculae.

== Biology ==
Larvae develop for 2–3 years in wood of dead trees and bushes and in living branches of Prunus. Adults emerge in May–June.

== Distribution ==
This widespread species is present in most of Europe, in the Near East and in North Africa.

== Gallery ==
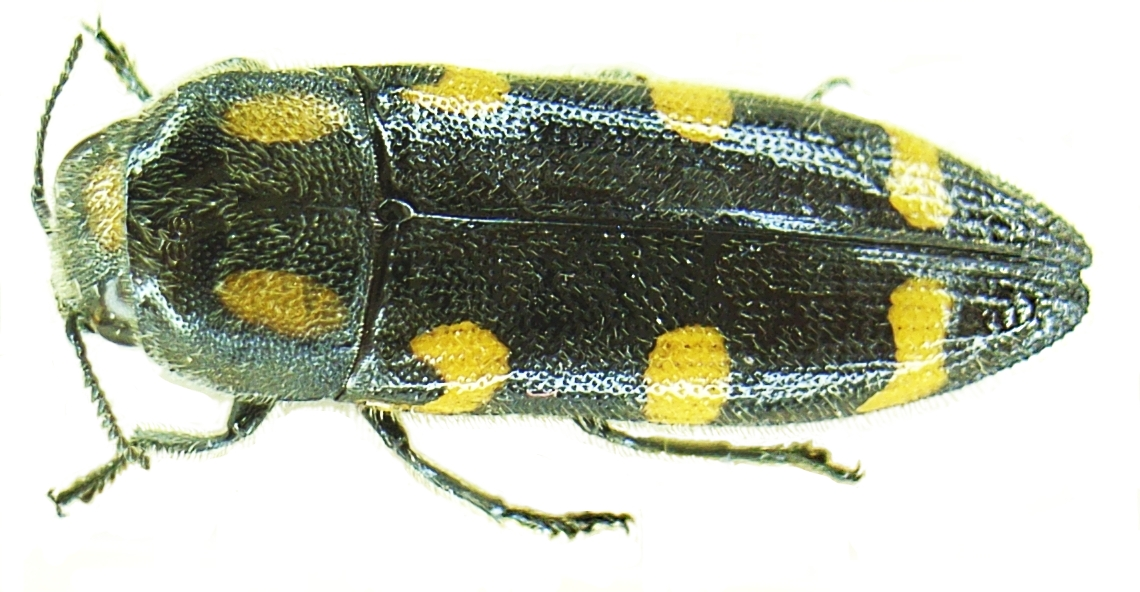
Ptosima undecimmaculata

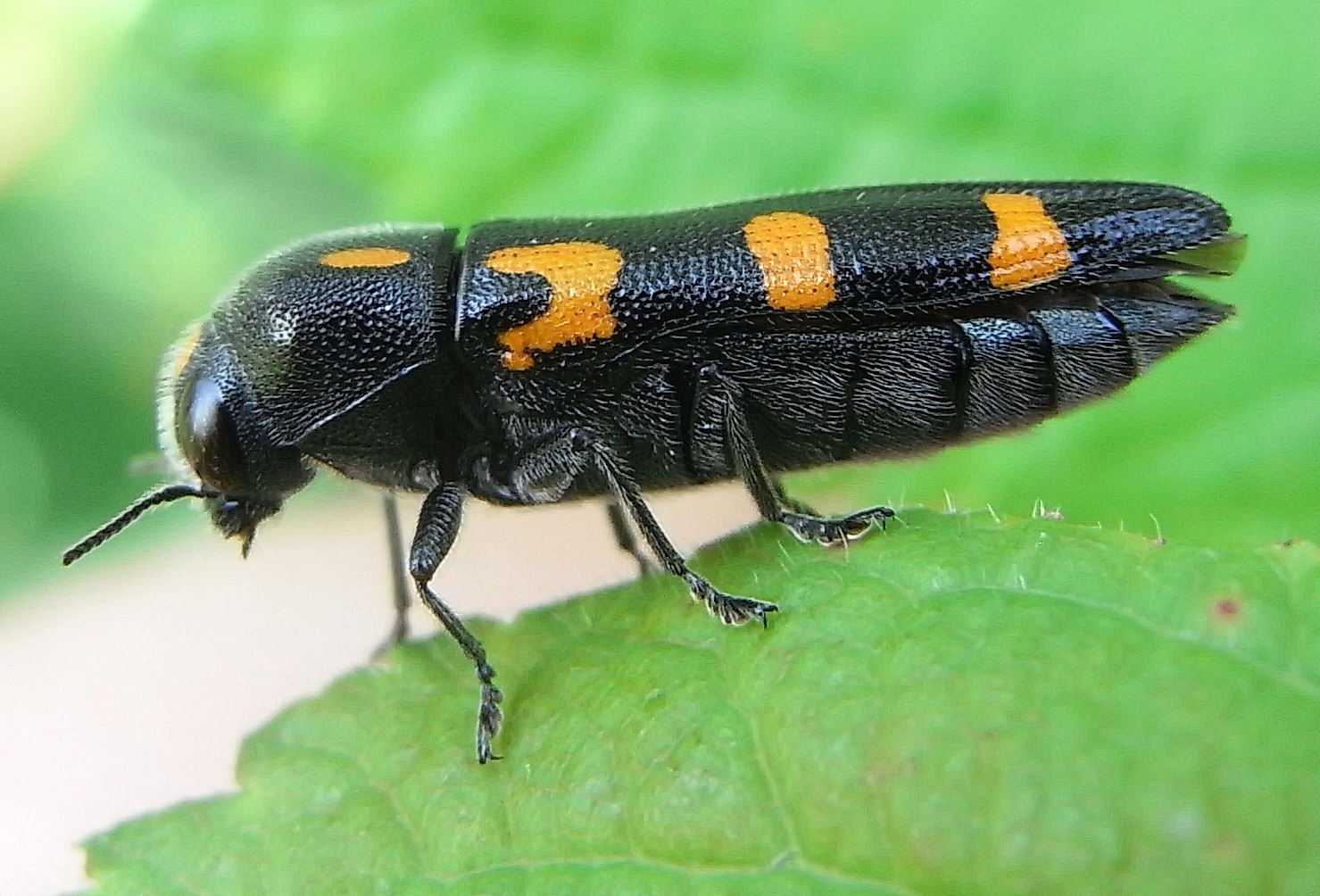
Lateral view

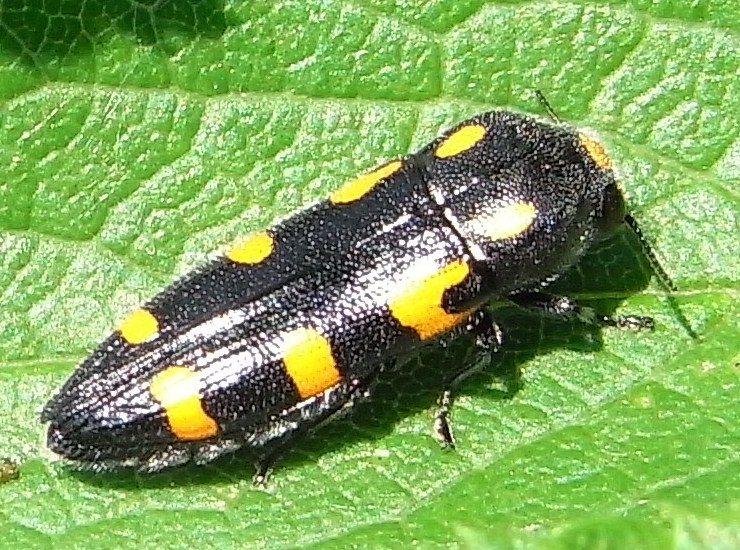
Dorsal view

== Bibliography ==
- Carl Gustav Calwer und Gustav Jäger (Herausgeber): C. G. Calwer's Käferbuch. K. Thienemanns, Stuttgart 1876, 3. Auflage
- H. Freude, K. W. Harde, G. A. Lohse: Die Käfer Mitteleuropas, Bd. 6. Spektrum Akademischer Verlag in Elsevier, München 1966, ISBN 3-827-40683-8
- H.Mühle, P.Brandl, M. Niehuis: Catalogus Faunae Graeciae; Coleoptera:Buprestidae Printed in Germany by Georg Rößle Augsburg 2000
- S. Bily, O.Brodsky "Taxonomical, biological and faunistical notes on Buprestidae and Cleridae from East Mediterranean" Türk.Bit.Kor.Derg (1982) 6: 185-194
