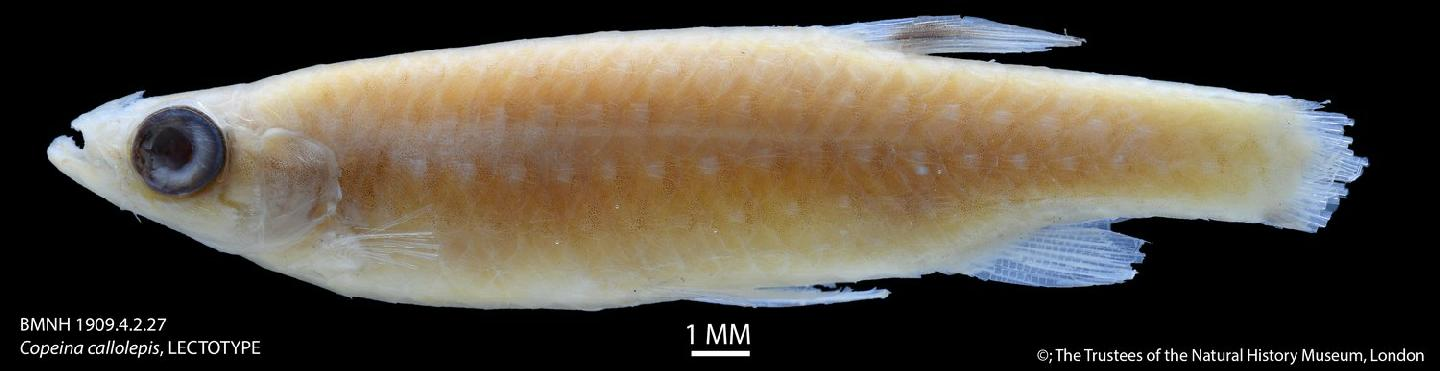

Conservation status
- Least Concern (IUCN 3.1)

Scientific classification
- Kingdom: Animalia
- Phylum: Chordata
- Class: Actinopterygii
- Order: Characiformes
- Family: Lebiasinidae
- Genus: Copella
- Species: C. nattereri

Binomial name
- Copella nattereri Steindachner, 1876

Synonyms
- Copella meinkeni Zarske & Géry, 2006

= Copella nattereri =

Species of fish

Copella nattereri. the spotted tetra s a species of freshwater ray-finned fish belonging to the family Lebiasinidae, the pencilfishes, splashing tetras and related fishes. This fish is found in the upper Amazon basin, as well as the Rio Negro and Orinoco basins. They grow no more than 4.5 centimetres (1.8 in).

== Etymology ==
The fish is named in honor of Johann Natterer (1787-1843), who explored South America and collected specimens there for 18 years, including the type specimen of this species along with many others.
