= Pyrrhulina laeta =

Conservation status
- Least Concern (IUCN 3.1)

Scientific classification
- Kingdom: Animalia
- Phylum: Chordata
- Class: Actinopterygii
- Order: Characiformes
- Family: Lebiasinidae
- Genus: Pyrrhulina
- Species: P. laeta

Binomial name
- Pyrrhulina laeta (Cope, 1872)

Synonyms
- Holotaxis laetus Cope, 1872

Species of fish

Pyrrhulina laeta, the half-banded pyrrhulina or half-lined pyrrhulina, is a species of freshwater ray-finned fish belonging to the family Lebiasinidae, which includes the pencilfishes, splash tetras and related fishes. This fish is found near Pebas, Peru, and in tributaries of the Ampiyacu River. It is frequently confused with other species.

== Physical appearance ==
The ocellated dorsal fin is the most attractive attribute. The back is pale olive, becoming silvery toward the belly. A fine, black line runs from the snout, across the eye to the end of the gill cover, then thickens to a wide band along the body, which suggests its common name, the half-banded pyrrulina. Other fins show blushes of red.

== In captivity ==
A mature male has a more elongated upper caudal fin lobe than the mature female. No record exists of breeding this species in captivity, but the feat is believed possible. The species is not attractive enough to warrant a thorough and intensive effort at breeding, yet with the great contrast of breeding habits in this family it might be interesting to try to induce them to spawn in captivity.
