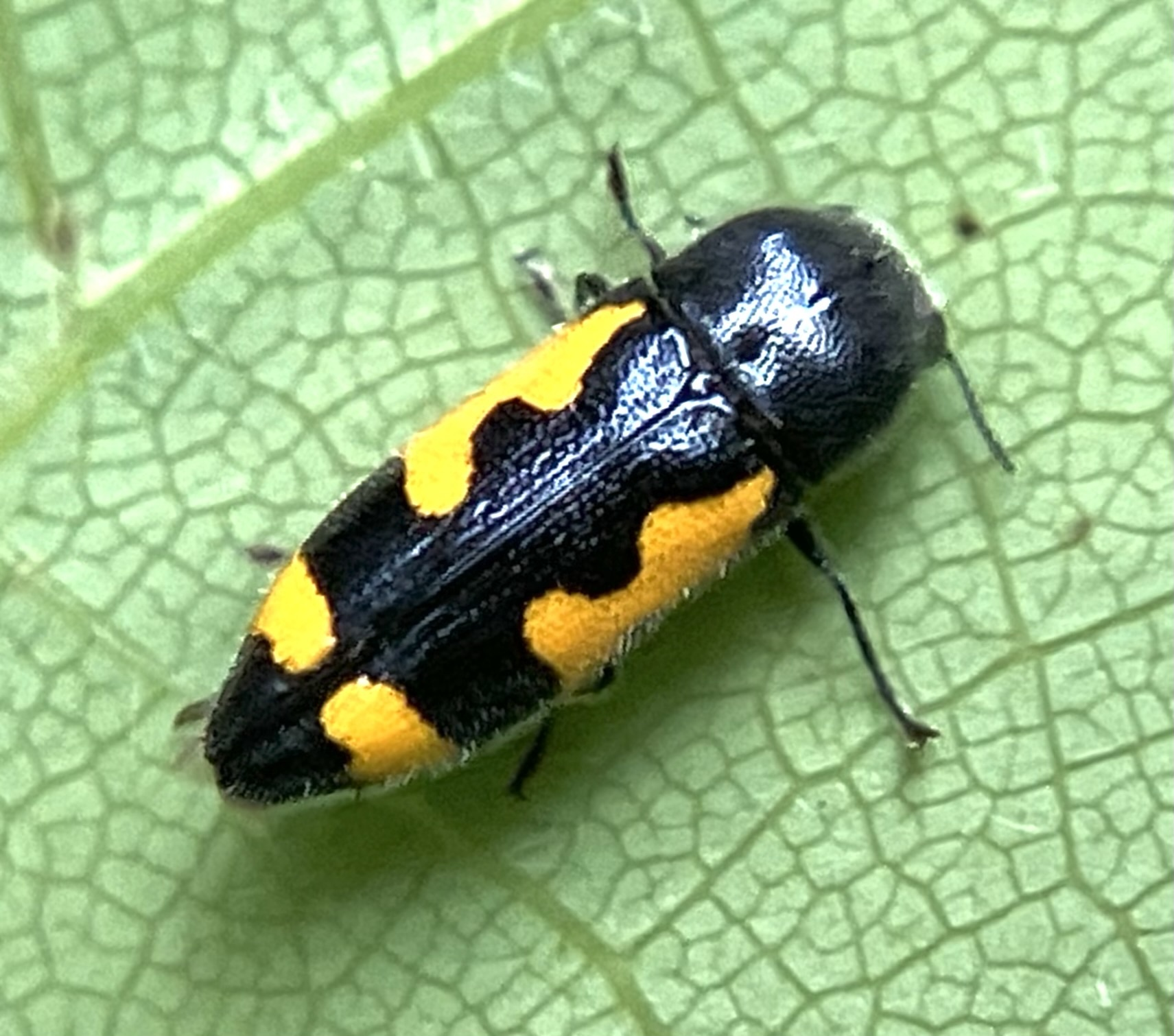

Scientific classification
- Domain: Eukaryota
- Kingdom: Animalia
- Phylum: Arthropoda
- Class: Insecta
- Order: Coleoptera
- Suborder: Polyphaga
- Infraorder: Elateriformia
- Family: Buprestidae
- Genus: Ptosima
- Species: P. gibbicollis

Binomial name
- Ptosima gibbicollis (Say, 1823)

Synonyms
- Buprestis gibbicollis Say, 1823; Ptosima luctuosa Gory, 1840

= Ptosima gibbicollis =

Species of beetle

Ptosima gibbicollis, the redbud borer, is a species of metallic wood-boring beetle in the family Buprestidae. It is found in North America.

== Taxonomy ==
This species was first described by Thomas Say in 1823 and named Buprestis gibbicollis.
