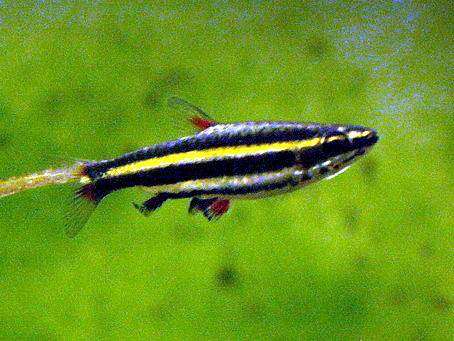

Conservation status
- Least Concern (IUCN 3.1)

Scientific classification
- Kingdom: Animalia
- Phylum: Chordata
- Class: Actinopterygii
- Order: Characiformes
- Family: Lebiasinidae
- Genus: Nannostomus
- Species: N. marginatus

Binomial name
- Nannostomus marginatus (C. H. Eigenmann, 1909)

= Nannostomus marginatus =

Dwarf pencilfish

Species of fish

Nannostomus marginatus (from the Greek: nanos = small, and the Latin stomus = relating to the mouth; from the Latin: marginatus = marginated), commonly known as the dwarf pencilfish, is a freshwater species of fish belonging to the genus Nannostomus in the characin family Lebiasinidae.

They were first described in 1909 by C. H. Eigenmann, and are typical of members of this genus, being small, elongated fish with prominent horizontal stripes. The most notable feature of N. marginatus is its size, being one of the smallest members of the genus, only reaching a maximum size of 35 mm (1.4 in).

They occur widely on the South American continent, having been recorded in Brazil, Guyana, Colombia, Suriname, and Peru.

They have been a popular aquarium species since their introduction to aquarists in the early twentieth century.

== Common name and synonyms ==
The common name given to N. marginatus is typically dwarf pencilfish, reflecting its diminutive size, although it is not the smallest known member of the genus, since both N. minimus and N. anduzei are smaller, possessing a maximum length of only 23 mm (0.91 in) and 16 mm (0.63 in) respectively. N. marginatus picturatus, a variant described by Hoedeman in 1954, is now regarded as a junior synonym.
