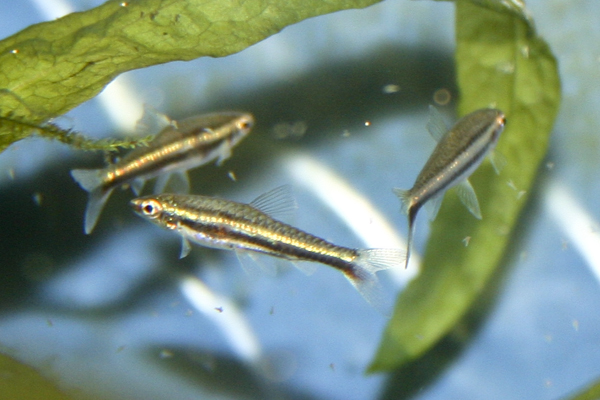

Conservation status
- Least Concern (IUCN 3.1)

Scientific classification
- Kingdom: Animalia
- Phylum: Chordata
- Class: Actinopterygii
- Order: Characiformes
- Family: Lebiasinidae
- Genus: Nannostomus
- Species: N. minimus

Binomial name
- Nannostomus minimus C. H. Eigenmann, 1909

= Nannostomus minimus =

Least pencilfish

Species of fish

Nannostomus minimus (from the Greek: nanos = small, and the Latin stoma = relating to the mouth; from the Latin: minimus = of the smallest size), commonly known as the least pencilfish, is a freshwater species of fish belonging to the characin family Lebiasinidae. It is restricted to Guyana, where it has been reported from the Potaro and Mazaruni rivers.

N. minimus reaches a length of 23 mm (0.91 in). When described in 1909, it was the smallest of the known pencilfishes; that distinction has since passed to N. anduzei.
