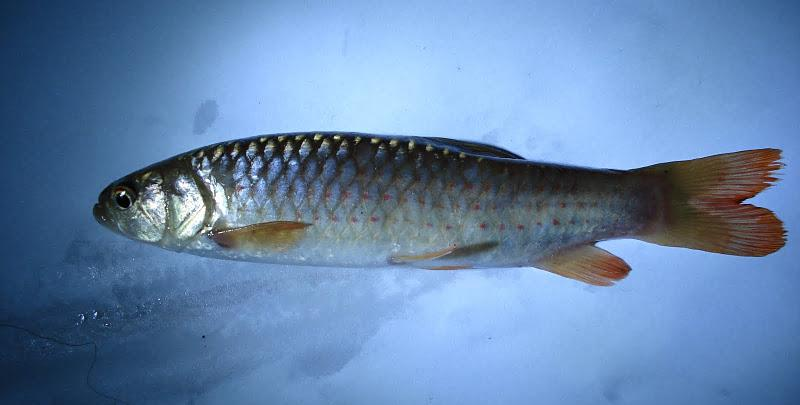
- Lebiasina boruca

Scientific classification
- Kingdom: Animalia
- Phylum: Chordata
- Class: Actinopterygii
- Order: Characiformes
- Family: Lebiasinidae
- Subfamily: Lebiasininae
- Genus: Lebiasina; Valenciennes, 1847

Type species
- Lebiasina bimaculata Valenciennes, 1847

Synonyms
- Piabucina Valenciennes, 1850

= Lebiasina =

Genus of fishes

Lebiasina is a genus of freshwater ray-finned fish belonging to the family Lebiasinidae, the pencifishes, splashing tetras and related fishes. The fishes in this genus are found in the Neotropics, where they inhabit well-oxygenated upland streams that originate in the Andes of Colombia, Ecuador and Peru, the Guianan Highlands in Brazil, Guyana and Venezuela, and Serra do Cachimbo in Brazil, as well as in southern Central America. The individual species tend to have relatively small ranges and the three species of Serra do Cachimbo, all restricted to the Curuá River basin, are considered threatened by Brazil's Ministry of the Environment.

They are elongated fish that reach up to 16 cm (6.3 in) in standard length.

== Species ==
Lebiasina contains the following species:

- Lebiasina ardilai Netto-Ferreira, Lopez-Fernandez, Taphorn & Liverpool, 2013
- Lebiasina astrigata (Regan, 1903)
- Lebiasina aureoguttata (Fowler, 1911)
- Lebiasina bimaculata Valenciennes, 1847
- Lebiasina boruca (Bussing, 1967)
- Lebiasina chocoensis Ardila Rodríguez, 2010
- Lebiasina chucuriensis Ardila Rodríguez, 2001
- Lebiasina colombia Ardila Rodríguez, 2008
- Lebiasina elongata (Boulenger, 1887)
- Lebiasina erythrinoides (Valenciennes, 1850)
- Lebiasina festae (Boulenger, 1899)
- Lebiasina floridablancaensis Ardila Rodríguez, 1994
- Lebiasina intermedia Meinken, 1936
- Lebiasina marilynae Netto-Ferreira, 2012
- Lebiasina melanoguttata Netto-Ferreira, 2012
- Lebiasina minuta Netto-Ferreira, 2012
- Lebiasina multimaculata Boulenger, 1911
- Lebiasina narinensis Ardila Rodríguez, 2002
- Lebiasina ortegai Ardila Rodríguez, 2008
- Lebiasina panamensis (Gill, 1877)
- Lebiasina provenzanoi Ardila Rodríguez, 1999
- Lebiasina taphorni Ardila Rodríguez, 2004
- Lebiasina unitaeniata (Günther, 1864)
- Lebiasina uruyensis Fernández-Yépez, 1967
- Lebiasina yepezi Netto-Ferreira, Oyakawa, Zuanon & Nolasco, 2011
- Lebiasina yuruaniensis Ardila Rodríguez, 2000
