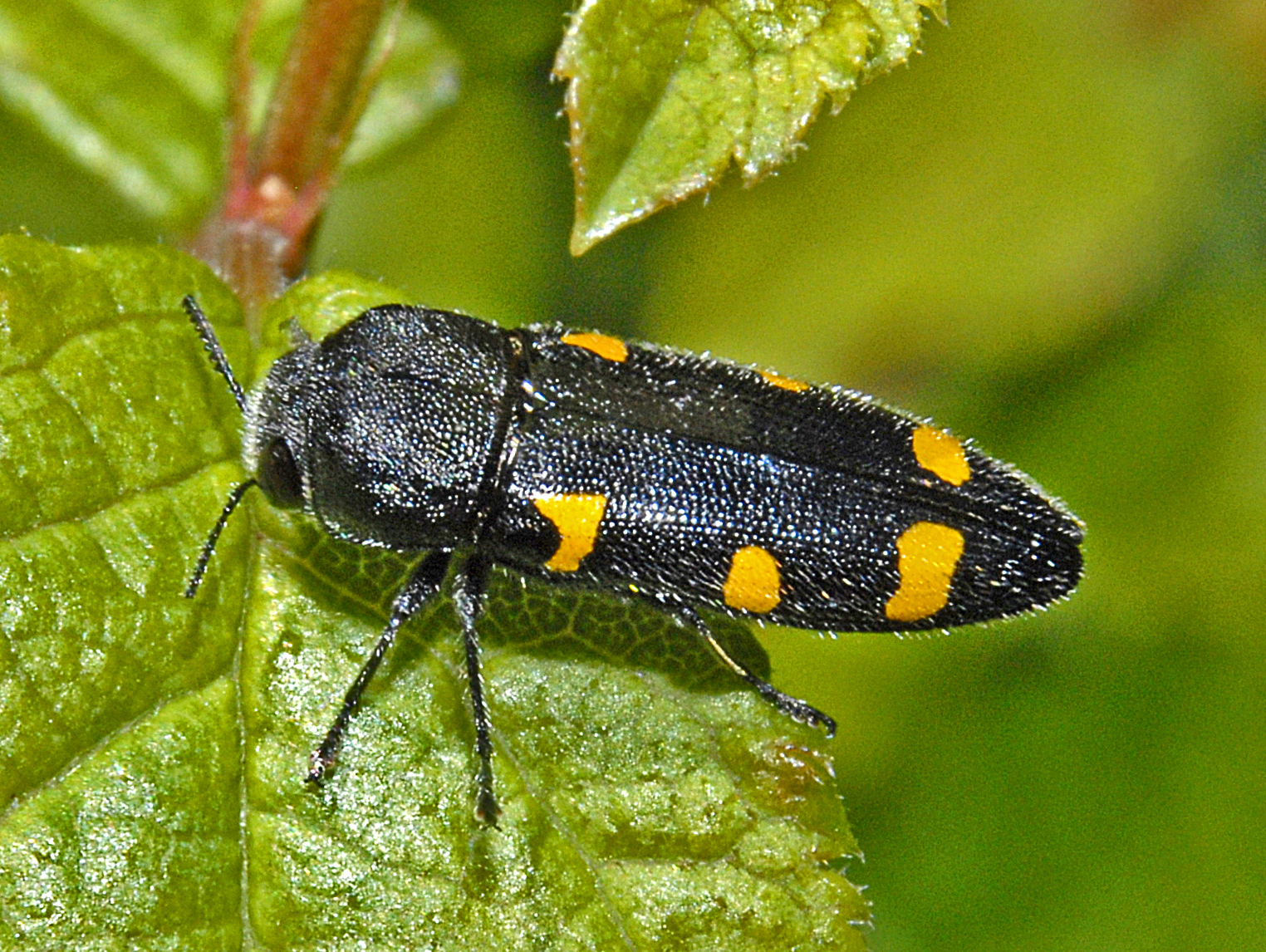
- Ptosima undecimmaculata

Scientific classification
- Kingdom: Animalia
- Phylum: Arthropoda
- Class: Insecta
- Order: Coleoptera
- Suborder: Polyphaga
- Infraorder: Elateriformia
- Family: Buprestidae
- Subfamily: Polycestinae
- Genus: Ptosima; Dejean, 1833

= Ptosima =

Genus of beetles

Ptosima is a genus of "jewel beetles" in the subfamily Polycestinae.

== Species ==
- Ptosima abyssa (Wickham, 1912)
- Ptosima bowringii Waterhouse, 1882
- Ptosima chinensis Marseul, 1867
- Ptosima embrikstrandina Obenberger, 1936
- Ptosima gibbicollis (Say, 1823)
- Ptosima idolynae Frost, 1923
- Ptosima indica Laporte & Gory, 1835
- Ptosima laeta Waterhouse, 1882
- Ptosima schaeffer (Wickham, 1912)
- Ptosima strandi Obenberger, 1924
- Ptosima sylvatica Wickham, 1914
- Ptosima undecimmaculata (Herbst, 1784)
- Ptosima walshii LeConte, 1863
