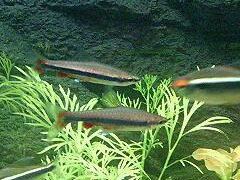

Conservation status
- Least Concern (IUCN 3.1)

Scientific classification
- Kingdom: Animalia
- Phylum: Chordata
- Class: Actinopterygii
- Order: Characiformes
- Family: Lebiasinidae
- Genus: Nannostomus
- Species: N. beckfordi

Binomial name
- Nannostomus beckfordi Günther, 1872

Synonyms
- Nannostomus anomalus Steindachner, 1876; Nannostomus simplex C. H. Eigenmann, 1909; Nannostomus aripirangensis Meinken, 1931; Nannostomus beckfordi surinami Hoedeman [J. J.] 1954

= Nannostomus beckfordi =

Golden pencilfish

Species of fish

Nannostomus beckfordi, the golden pencilfish, is a species of freshwater ray-finned fish belonging to the family Lebiasinidae, the pencil fishes, splashing tetras and related fishes. This species is indigenous to northern South America, but has been introduced to the Atlantic coastal region of Brazil.

== Taxonomy ==
Nannostomus beckfordi was first formally described in 1872 by the German-born British ichthyologist Albert Günther, with its type locality given as the coast of Demerara in Guyana. When Günther described this genus, he classified it in the new monospecific genus Nannostomus, which means that the golden pencilfish is the type species of that genus by monotypy. The genus Nannostomus has been placed within the monotypic tribe Nannostomomini, a clade proposed by Carl H. Eigenmann in 1909, of the subfamily Pyrrhulininae in the family Lebiasinidae within the suborder Characoidei of the order Characiformes.

== Etymology ==
Nannostomus beckfordi is the type species of the genus Nannostomus. This name combines the Greek nannos, which means "dwarf", with stome, meaning "mouth", an allusion to the narrow mouth of this species. The specific name honours F. J. B. Beckford, an English apiarist and naturalist who obtained the holotype in British Guiana and presented it to the British Museum (Natural History).

== Description ==
Nannostomus beckfordi has a clear horizontal stripe along its flanks with at least one other less distinct horizontal stripe running parallel to it. An even less distinct third stripe may consist of a few dark spots close to the base of the pelvic fin. There is no adipose fin. Günther described the colour pattern as being a silvery band running along the middle of the flanks, edged above with a reddish band and below by a blackish band, and with a black spot on the lower half of the operculum. The caudal fin was described as being red. However, this fish has a wide range, and the colour varies geographically, as well as seasonally, with breeding males sporting the most intense colours. At night these fishes develop a camouflaged barred pattern.

The golden pencilfish has a maximum standard length of 6.5 cm (2.6 in).

== Distribution and habitat ==
Nannostomus beckfordi is native to northern South America in the drainage systems of the Amazon, the Orinoco and the coastal rivers of the Guiana Shield, in Brazil, Colombia, French Guiana, Guyana, Suriname and Venezuela. The golden pencilfish has been introduced into coastal rivers in southern and northeastern Brazil, but the fishes in northeastern Brazil may actually be native; this requires further research. This species is found in small, slow rivers and in swamps.

== Biology ==
Nannostomus beckfordi lives in small groups in which the males are dominant and defend the group's territory. They feed on small invertebrates. These fishes pair up to spawn and swim alongside each other. The females lay several small batches of eggs among fine leafed vegetation. These batches may total up to 200 eggs. The eggs hatch in 30 to 40 hours, with free swimming fry developing about six days after hatching.

== Utilisation ==
Nannostomus beckfordi is a popular aquarium fish.
