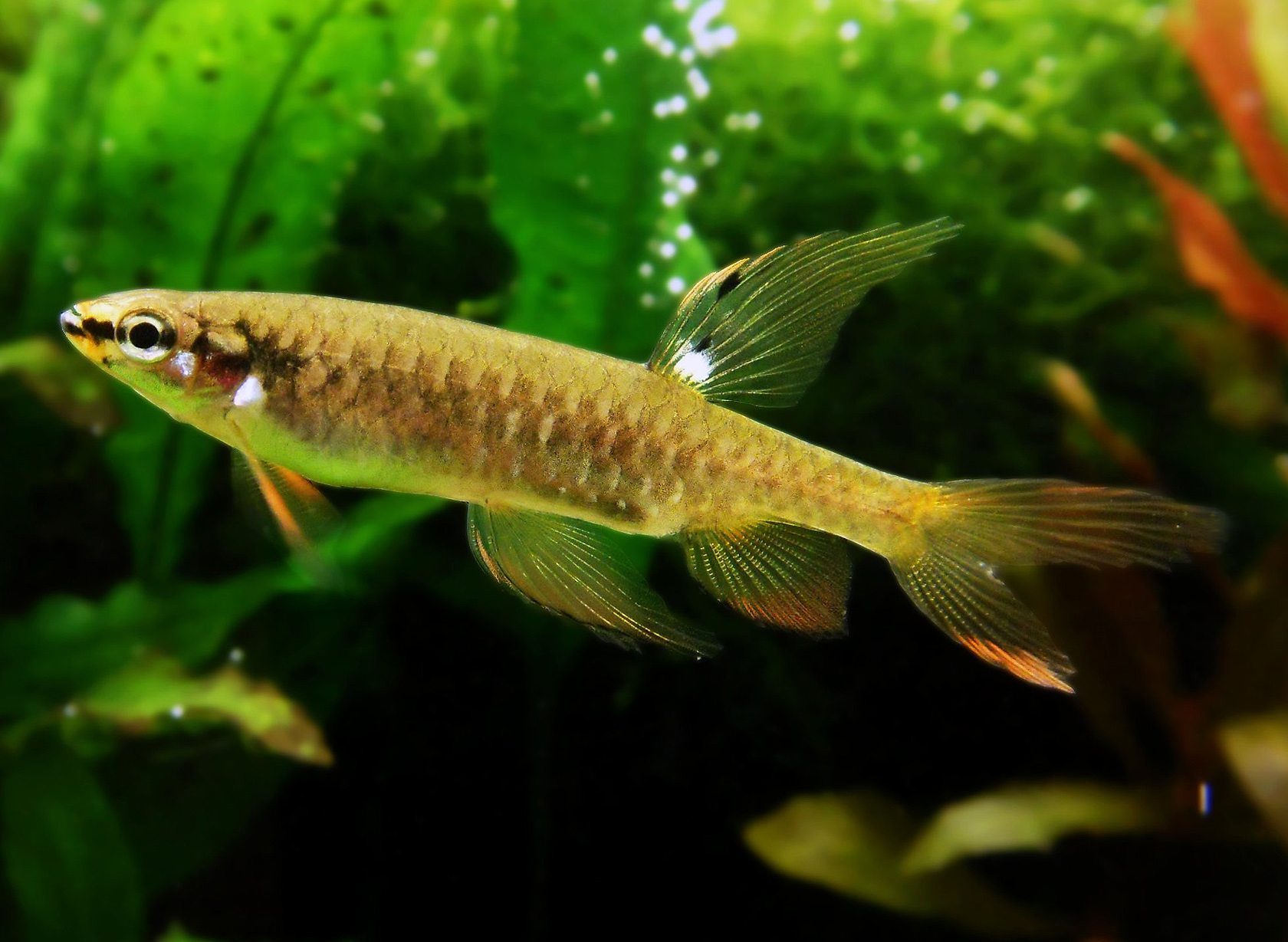
- Copella arnoldi

Scientific classification
- Kingdom: Animalia
- Phylum: Chordata
- Class: Actinopterygii
- Division: Teleostei
- Order: Characiformes
- Family: Lebiasinidae
- Subfamily: Pyrrhulininae
- Genus: Copella; G. S. Myers, 1956

Type species
- Copeina compta Myers, 1927

Species
- see text

= Copella (fish) =

Genus of fishes

Copella is a genus of freshwater fish belonging to the family Lebiasinidae, native to South America, known colloquially to aquarists as splashing tetras or splash tetras, because of the unique reproductive method of the best-known representative of the genus, Copella arnoldi. They are not as closely related to the tetras proper in the Characidae as initially believed.

Copella species are found in assorted slow-moving tributaries in the Amazon basin, Orinoco and The Guianas.

== Description ==
These fish are elongated in shape, with scales marked in such a way as to make visual differentiation of individual scales easy by simple naked-eye observation. The pectoral fins are positioned immediately behind the operculum or gill cover, while the pelvic fins are further back along the body, about midway between the head and the caudal peduncle. The dorsal fin is positioned above and slightly behind the pelvic fins, and midway between the pelvic fins and the tail fin is the anal fin. The tail fin is forked in shape. Males usually possess more elongated and ornate unpaired fins than females. In the case of C. arnoldi, the tail fin of the male is somewhat asymmetrical, the upper lobe being larger than the lower lobe, and this modification of the more usual symmetrical tail fin shape (tail fin symmetry is a characteristic of the majority of fishes belonging to the Actinopterygii) is linked to the reproductive activity of the species.

== Species ==
Originally, numerous species belonging to this genus were placed in the genus Copeina. Taxonomic revisions taking place in 1994 and afterwards have moved all of these fishes into Copella.

The currently recognized species in this genus are:

- Copella arnoldi (Regan, 1912) (splash tetra)
- Copella callolepis (Regan, 1912)
- Copella compta (G. S. Myers, 1927)
- Copella eigenmanni (Regan, 1912)
- Copella nattereri (Steindachner, 1876) (spotted tetra)
- Copella vilmae Géry, 1963 (rainbow copella)

== Unusual breeding behaviour in C. arnoldi ==
Though the majority of fishes of this genus spawn in a conventional fashion among fine-leaved aquatic plants, C. arnoldi (and any undescribed relatives) is unique among fishes in that it lays its eggs on plants out of water. The male displays to passing females beneath overhanging vegetation growing beside its native waters, and when a receptive female accepts the invitation to spawn, she positions herself directly alongside the male, and the pair leaps out of the water together, attaching themselves by fin suction to the underside of a leaf. The pair then produces and fertilises 6-8 eggs, before falling back into the water. This procedure is repeated until as many as 200 eggs are attached to the leaf. Once the egg mass is complete, the male positions himself among fine-leaved vegetation, watching the egg mass, and intermittently emerges from cover to splash the eggs with water using his asymmetrical tail fin to keep the eggs moist. Once the eggs hatch, the fry fall into the water from the leaf and swim for cover.

As a consequence of this remarkable breeding behaviour, which is unique amongst the world's fishes, the members of the entire genus have come to be known colloquially as splashing tetras, though strictly speaking the only fish that deserves this epithet is C. arnoldi.
