= Nannostomus nitidus =

Scientific classification
- Kingdom: Animalia
- Phylum: Chordata
- Class: Actinopterygii
- Division: Teleostei
- Order: Characiformes
- Family: Lebiasinidae
- Genus: Nannostomus
- Species: N. nitidus

Binomial name
- Nannostomus nitidus Weitzman, 1978

Species of freshwater fish

Nannostomus nitidus, commonly known as the shining pencilfish or the red shining pencilfish, is a species of small freshwater fish in the family Lebiasinidae. It was described by Stanley H. Weitzman in 1978.
