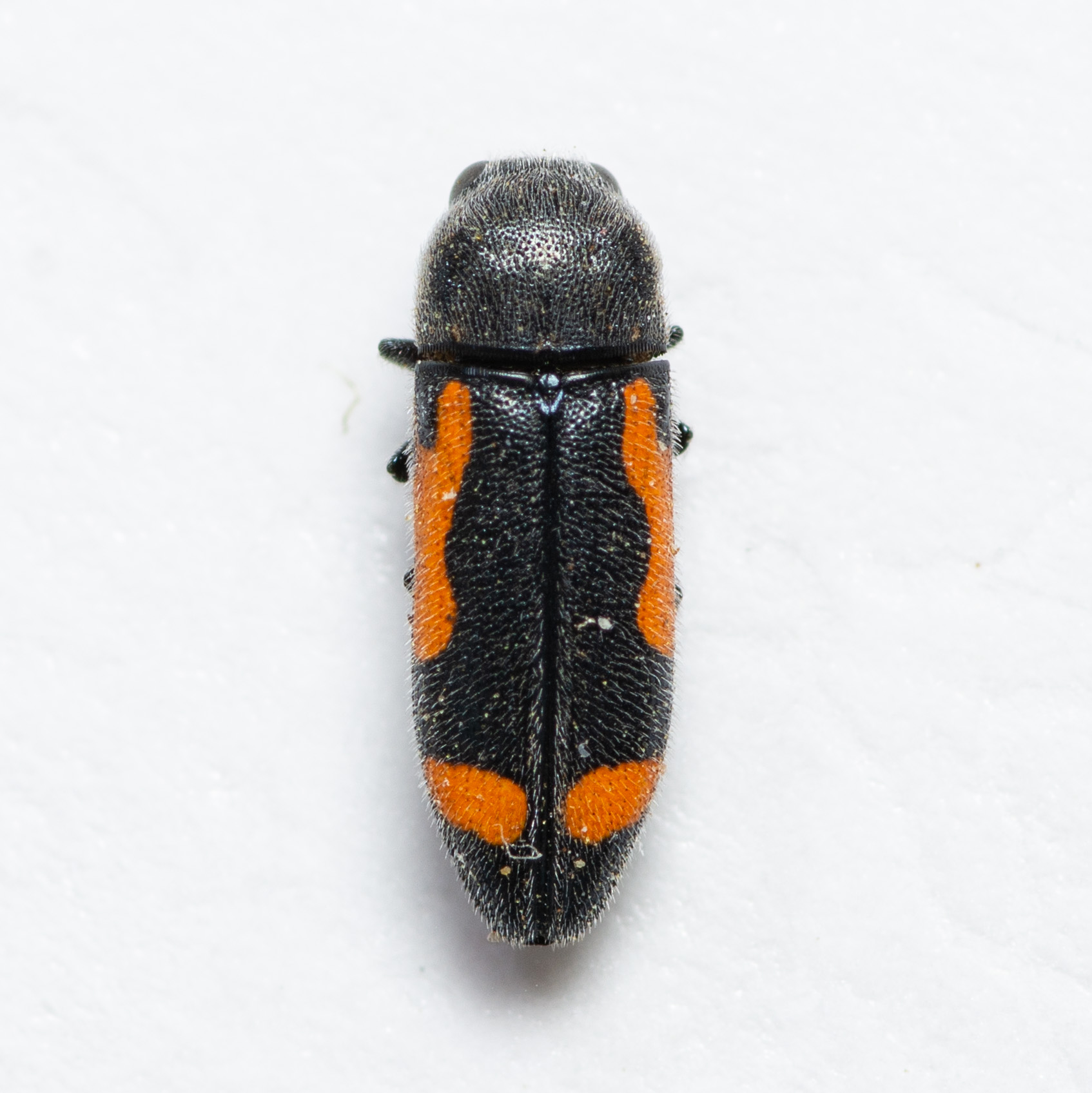

Scientific classification
- Domain: Eukaryota
- Kingdom: Animalia
- Phylum: Arthropoda
- Class: Insecta
- Order: Coleoptera
- Suborder: Polyphaga
- Infraorder: Elateriformia
- Family: Buprestidae
- Genus: Ptosima
- Species: P. laeta

Binomial name
- Ptosima laeta Waterhouse, 1882

Synonyms
- Ptosima schaefferi Chamberlin, 1926

= Ptosima laeta =

Species of beetle

Ptosima laeta, the Texas redbud borer, is a species of metallic wood-boring beetle in the family Buprestidae. It is found in Central America and North America.
