= Copeina =

Scientific classification
- Kingdom: Animalia
- Phylum: Chordata
- Class: Actinopterygii
- Order: Characiformes
- Family: Lebiasinidae
- Subfamily: Pyrrhulininae
- Genus: Copeina; Fowler, 1906

Type species
- Pyrrhulina argyrops Cope, 1878

Genus of fishes

Copeina is a genus of freshwater ray-finned fish belonging to the family Lebiasinidae, the pencifishes, splashing tetras and related fishes. The fishes in this genus are found in the Amazon basin.

== Species ==
Copeina contains the following species:

- Copeina guttata (Steindachner, 1876) (redspotted tetra)
- Copeina osgoodi C. H. Eigenmann, 1922
