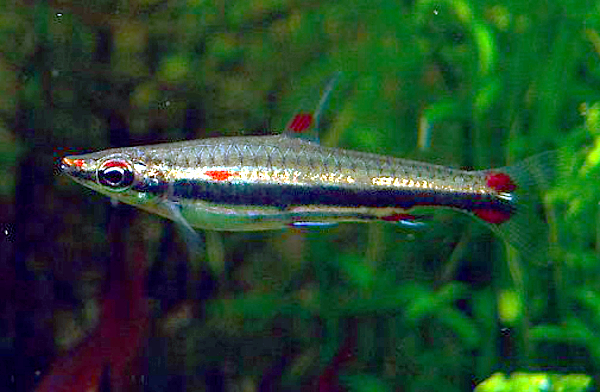
- Nannostomus trifasciatus

Scientific classification
- Kingdom: Animalia
- Phylum: Chordata
- Class: Actinopterygii
- Order: Characiformes
- Family: Lebiasinidae
- Subfamily: Pyrrhulininae
- Genus: Nannostomus; Günther, 1872

Type species
- Nannostomus beckfordi Günther, 1872

Synonyms
- Archicheir C. H. Eigenmann, 1909; Poecilobrycon Eigenmann, 1909; Nannobrycon Hoedeman, 1950

= Pencil fish =

Pencilfish

Genus of fishes

Nannostomus (from the Greek nanos, meaning "small", and the Latin stomus, relating to the mouth) is a genus of fish belonging to the characin family Lebiasinidae. All of the species in this genus are known as pencil fish, a popular name that was initially only applied to two species in the 1920s, Nannostomus unifasciatus and Nannostomus eques. By the late 1950s, however, the term was applied to all members of the genus. Several species have become popular aquarium fish due to their attractive coloration, unique shape, and interesting demeanor.

== Taxonomy ==
The genus Nannostomus was first described by Günther in 1872, with the type species N. beckfordi. In 1876, Steindachner described three more species, N. unifasciatus, N. eques (pictured below), and N. trifasciatus (pictured above). In 1909, Carl H. Eigenmann described N. marginatus, N. minimus, N. erythrurus and N. harrisoni. Several of these have been popular with aquarists since the early 20th century, partly due to enthusiastic articles written about them and photographs taken by William T. Innes that were published as early as 1933.

Over the years, the genus was split by subsequent authors into other genera, including Poecilobrycon and Nannobrycon. After nearly a century of debate on the subject, Dr. Stanley Howard Weitzman and Dr. J. Stanley Cobb restored earlier taxonomy and expanded upon it, unifying all species under Nannostomus in 1975. This comprehensive revision of the genus has now been widely accepted. Weitzman is also responsible for describing five of the more recently introduced species, N. marilynae, N. limatus, N. nitidus, N. britskii and N. anduzei. Twenty species are now known, most of which are also familiar to aquarists. Several other unidentified Nannostomus species have been imported over the years; many were found as bycatch with other small characins, but their taxonomic status is yet to be determined.

== Species ==
Nannostomus contains the following species:

- Nannostomus anduzei Fernández & S. H. Weitzman, 1987
- Nannostomus beckfordi Günther, 1872 (golden pencil fish)
- Nannostomus bifasciatus Hoedeman, 1954 (two-lined pencil fish, whiteside pencil fish)
- Nannostomus britskii Weitzman, 1978 (spot stripe pencil fish)
- Nannostomus digrammus (Fowler, 1913) (two-stripe pencil fish)
- Nannostomus eques Steindachner, 1876 (brown pencil fish, Diptail)
- Nannostomus erythrurus (C. H. Eigenmann, 1909)
- Nannostomus espei (Meinken, 1956) (Espe's pencil fish, barred pencil fish, brown pencil fish)
- Nannostomus grandis Zarske, 2011
- Nannostomus harrisoni (C. H. Eigenmann, 1909) (Harrison's pencil fish, black stripe pencil fish)
- Nannostomus limatus Weitzman, 1978 (elegant pencil fish)
- Nannostomus marginatus C. H. Eigenmann, 1909 (dwarf pencil fish)
- Nannostomus marilynae Weitzman & Cobb, 1975 (Marilyn's pencil fish, greenstripe pencil fish)
- Nannostomus minimus C. H. Eigenmann, 1909 (least pencil fish)
- Nannostomus mortenthaleri Paepke & Arendt, 2001 (coral-red pencil fish)
- Nannostomus nigrotaeniatus Zarske, 2013
- Nannostomus nitidus Weitzman, 1978 (shining pencil fish)
- Nannostomus rubrocaudatus Zarske, 2009 (purple pencil fish)
- Nannostomus trifasciatus Steindachner, 1876 (three-stripe pencil fish)
- Nannostomus unifasciatus Steindachner, 1876 (one-line pencil fish)

== Description ==
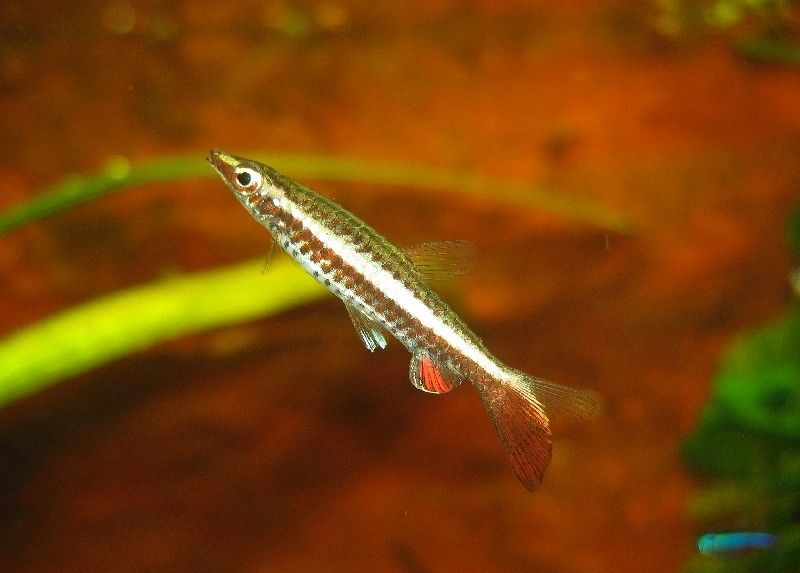
Nannostomus eques (brown pencil fish, diptail)

Most species are slender, pencil-shaped fish ranging in size from under 1 to 2 in long (2.5 to 5.1 cm). N. marginatus, N. rubrocaudatus, and N. mortenthaleri possess shortened, blockier outlines reminiscent of pencil stubs. All but one species, Nannostomus espei, have one to five horizontal black or brown stripes with gold or silver iridescence appearing above the primary stripe. Most also display red, orange, or maroon highlights on their fins, and many have flashes of these colors on their bodies as well. The recently described N. mortenthaleri and N. rubrocaudatus are especially vividly colored. N. espei is unique in that the horizontal stripes are only weakly present and are supplanted by five dark comma-shaped blotches. Other species take this appearance at night, but only N. espei displays the pattern permanently and in daylight.

The adipose fin is present in some species and absent in others, while in certain species, such as N. eques, its presence or absence varies between individuals.

All species swim horizontally, except N. unifasciatus and N. eques, which assume an oblique, 'snout-up' posture.

Sexual dimorphism occurs in the genus to varying degrees. In some species, the males are more brilliantly colored, especially the fins. In other species, dimorphism is far less evident. However, the anal fin is generally a reliable indicator of gender. For most species, the anal fin of adult males is enlarged and elongated (as in N. espei, N. eques, etc.) and/or more colorful (as in N. harrisoni, N. marginatus, etc.). The popular aquarium species, N. trifasciatus, is an exception in this regard.

== Distribution ==
The genus as a whole has a vast distribution in South America, from Colombia, Venezuela, and the Guyanas in the north, to the southern Amazon basin and Bolivia in the south, to Peru in the west, and Belém, Brazil in the east. Several of the individual species have a distribution nearly as vast. As a result, many of the species are polymorphic and manifest marked color variations depending on the population. Over the years, some of these color variants have been erroneously described as separate species. Such names as Nannostomus ocellatus, N. anomalus and N. auratus, among many others, are now known to be junior synonyms for the various species.

== In the aquarium ==
To date, only two species, N. beckfordi and N. harrisoni, have been commercially raised for the aquarium trade in fisheries, mostly in Asia. All of the remaining species that find their way to home aquaria are wild-caught from South American waters. Nannostomus species thrive in home aquaria when provided with soft, moderately acidic water, low nitrate levels, and temperatures in the range of 22–28 °C (72–82 °F). The addition of aquatic plants is recommended, including floating varieties as they reduce the likelihood of fish jumping, a common occurrence for some of the species, especially N. espei and N. unifasciatus. They should be kept in schools of at least six, or in a community aquarium with other species of Nannostomus, other small peaceful characins, or corydoras. Aquariums with a strong water current, large tankmates, or swift-moving species should be avoided. If kept in a thickly planted single-species aquarium with the above water parameters, most species will spawn, eggs will not be eaten, and fry will be found growing in the floating plants. Baby brine shrimp, live or frozen, and other small-sized foods are required for both fry and adults. They are also avid biofilm grazers and, for most of the species, algae are under-reported staples of their diet.

In most species, the males establish small territories and defend them. Their defensive actions are usually harmless, but in two species, N. mortenthaleri and N. trifasciatus, antagonistic behavior directed at conspecifics can be harmful if sufficient space and plant cover is not provided.

Once acclimated to the aquarium and provided with suitable conditions, they are hardy, often living for five or more years.
