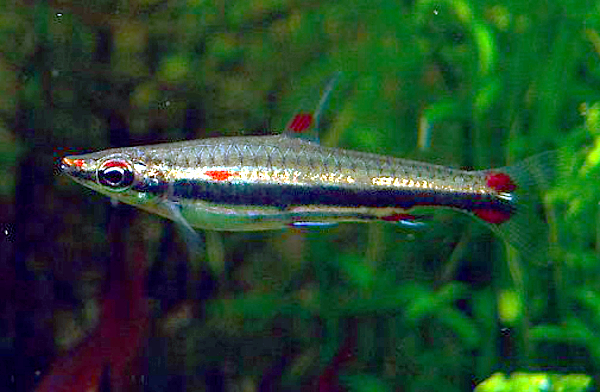
- Nannostomus trifasciatus

Scientific classification
- Kingdom: Animalia
- Phylum: Chordata
- Class: Actinopterygii
- Order: Characiformes
- Suborder: Characoidei
- Family: Lebiasinidae; Gill, 1889

Subfamilies
- see text

= Lebiasinidae =

Family of fishes

The Lebiasinidae are a family of freshwater fishes found in Costa Rica, Panama, and South America. They are usually small and are known as ornamental fishes in aquaria, including popular fishes such as the various pencilfish and the splashing tetra.

Lebiasinids are small, cylindrical fish, ranging from 2 to 18 cm (0.8 to 7.1 in) in adult length. They prey on insect larvae, especially those of mosquitos. The family includes the voladoras (genera Lebiasina and Piabucina), mostly found in highlands of the north Andes, the Guiana Shield and Central America, but the other species are mainly lowland fish inhabiting the Orinoco, Amazon and Paraguay River basins, and rivers of the Guianas.

== Genera ==
Around 67 species are placed in these genera:

- Subfamily Lebiasininae Gill, 1889 (lebiasinas or voladoras)
  - Derhamia Géry & Zarske, 2002
  - Lebiasina Valenciennes, 1847
- Subfamily Pyrrhulininae Bleeker, 1859 (splashing tetras and pencilfishes)
  - Copeina Fowler, 1906
  - Copella Myers, 1956
  - Nannostomus Günther, 1872
  - Pyrrhulina Valenciennes, 1846
