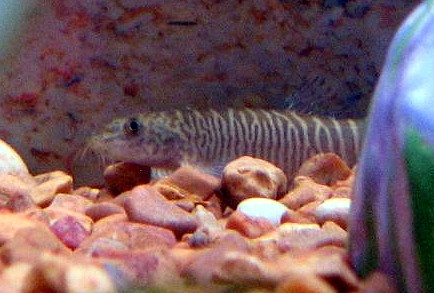

Conservation status
- Least Concern (IUCN 3.1)

Scientific classification
- Kingdom: Animalia
- Phylum: Chordata
- Class: Actinopterygii
- Order: Cypriniformes
- Family: Nemacheilidae
- Genus: Schistura
- Species: S. mahnerti

Binomial name
- Schistura mahnerti Kottelat, 1990

= Schistura mahnerti =

Species of tropical freshwater fish

Schistura mahnerti is a species of tropical freshwater fish of the stone loach family Nemacheilidae. It inhabits fast-flowing streams of Thailand and Myanmar (Burma). S. mahnerti is one of the more recent species to be introduced to the aquarium trade.

Other common names for this fish include the Burmese-border sand loach and red-tail sand loach. It is sometimes mislabeled in pet stores as a zebra loach or Burmese Border loach, which are both members of the genus Botia.

== Etymology ==
The fish is named in honor of Austrian zoologist Volker Mahnert (1943–2008),of the Museum d’Histoire Naturelle, Département d’Herpétologie et Ichthyologie in Geneva, because of his help at the various stages of Kottelat’s monograph.

== Description and behavior ==
Red-tail sand loaches share common characteristics with its genus-mates in Schistura: elongated bodies, flat bellies and striped coloration. Finnage may take a reddish hue as the fish matures. This sand loach shows sexual dimorphism via suborbital flaps, present only in males. Movement is characterized by short, rapid bursts from one point to another. The maximum known size is 3 inches (7.6 cm).

The stripe pattern is common to many Schistura species, complicating identification. Along with suborbital flaps missing in some other species, S. mahnerti has at least 9 caudal rays. The stripes resemble the split bands of a zebra or tiger up front, then turn into thick solid bands toward the tail.

S. mahnerti requires plenty of hiding spaces separated by visual barriers to distinguish its territory. Although it can be taught to accept flake food in captivity, it prefers a largely carnivorous diet of mosquito larvae, bloodworms, and small insects.

== Distribution ==
Schistura mahnerti comes from the Salween River, which flows from the Himalayas eastward as the border to Thailand and Burma.

In its habitat, the natural water chemistry has a pH of 6 to 6.9, slightly acidic. Due to the fast flow of the streams, the water is well-oxygenated and the tropical climate keeps the water from 73 to 79 °F (23 to 26 °C).

== In the Aquarium ==
This species can be aggressive when kept alone, or in small numbers. Its behavior stabilizes when given proper water conditions, and a larger group of conspecifics. Increasing water movement and aeration will help in keeping this fish healthy. This species is sensitive to medication, especially copper based. If medication is required, a separate tank should be used and the dosage should be carefully monitored. A variety of foods should be offered, with a concentration on high protein. Under correct conditions this fish is a wonderful addition to a semi-aggressive aquarium and can live up to 12 years.
