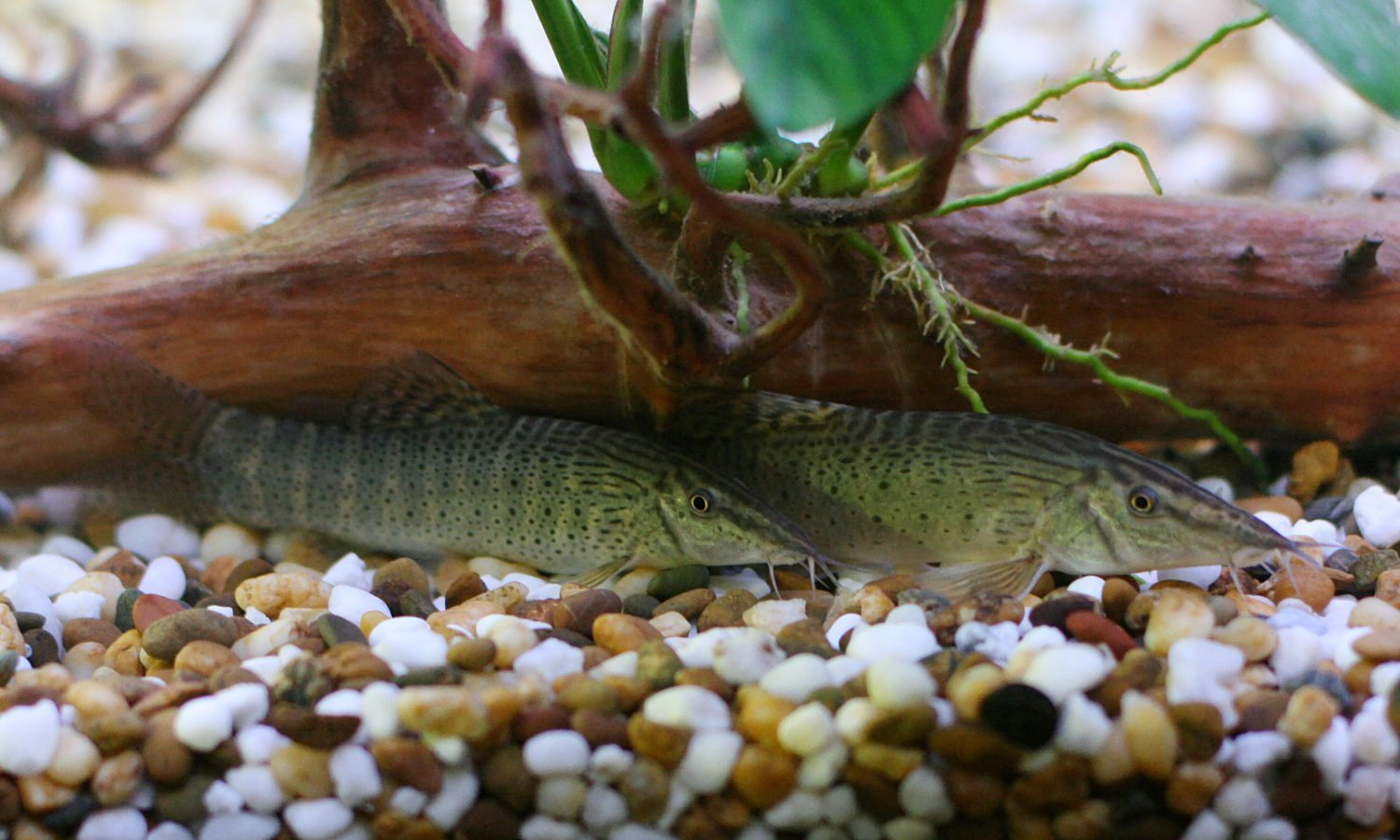

Conservation status
- Near Threatened (IUCN 3.1)

Scientific classification
- Kingdom: Animalia
- Phylum: Chordata
- Class: Actinopterygii
- Order: Cypriniformes
- Family: Botiidae
- Genus: Syncrossus
- Species: S. beauforti

Binomial name
- Syncrossus beauforti (Smith, 1931)

Synonyms
- Botia beauforti Smith, 1931; Botia lucasbahi Fowler, 1937; Botia yunnanensis Chen, 1980

= Syncrossus beauforti =

Species of fish

Synocrossus beauforti, the barred loach, chameleon loach or chameleon botia, is a species of freshwater fish from the loach family Botiidae which is found in mainland south-east Asia.

== Description ==
Syncrossus beauforti resembles Syncrossus berdmorei but has 11-14 dorsal fin rays as opposed to 9–10 in S. berdmorei. Tn both species there are rows of small, dark spots running along the length of the body and the head, but in S. beauforti these markings are a slightly smaller and it has 9-12 faint vertical bars on its body. As the fish matures bars may fade leaving the longitudinal rows of dark markings. The dorsal fin has a black margin and three rows of spots, while the caudal fin has several vertical rows of spots. When excited, these fish are able to produce clicking sounds. They grow to a maximum length of 25 cm standard length.

== Distribution ==
Syncrossus beauforti is found in south-east Asia and the species was originally described from specimens taken in a stream in Nakhon Si Thammarat Province in southern Thailand and was then recorded in Trang Province and has now been found to occur in the basin of the Salween River on the borders between Thailand and Myanmar and the Chao Phraya River system in western and central Thailand. Records from the Mekong are now attributed to two separate species, S, yunnanensis and S. formosanus which may be synonyms of Syncrossus lucasbahi.

== Habitat and ecology ==
Syncrossus beauforti occurs in the demersal zone of small and medium-sized rivers and it is habitually associated with streams which clear and fast flowing with a stony or rocky substrate, with large amounts of wood debris and leaf litter. It may enter flooded forest during the high-water periods during the monsoon and returns to the rivers during November and December. It digs burrows in sand or excavates them under rocks. It is omnivorous with the bulk of its diet being made up of insect larvae and benthic animals. Species in the genus Syncrossus are sociable and are known to form dominance hierarchies within social groups and to undertake ritualised behaviours to determine their place in the hierarchy. These fish possess sharp sub-ocular spines which they can move, these are normally hidden inside a pouch of skin but when the fish is stressed it can erect these spines. In addition they make sounds when excited but the purpose of the sounds is unknown.

== Human use and conservation ==
Syncrossus beauforti is sometimes recorded in fish markets being sold for human consumption. It is an aquarium fish but it has not been known to have been bred in captivity so all of the individuals traded are assumed to have been caught in the wild. The taking of specimens for this trade appears to be the principal threat to this species. It is also threatened by pollution and by the damming of the rivers it occurs in which may prevent the fish from migrating to its spawning areas during the periods of flooding, as well as increasing sedimentation and causing habitat degradation. The population is thought to be decreasing but the population size and extent of the decline is unknown.
