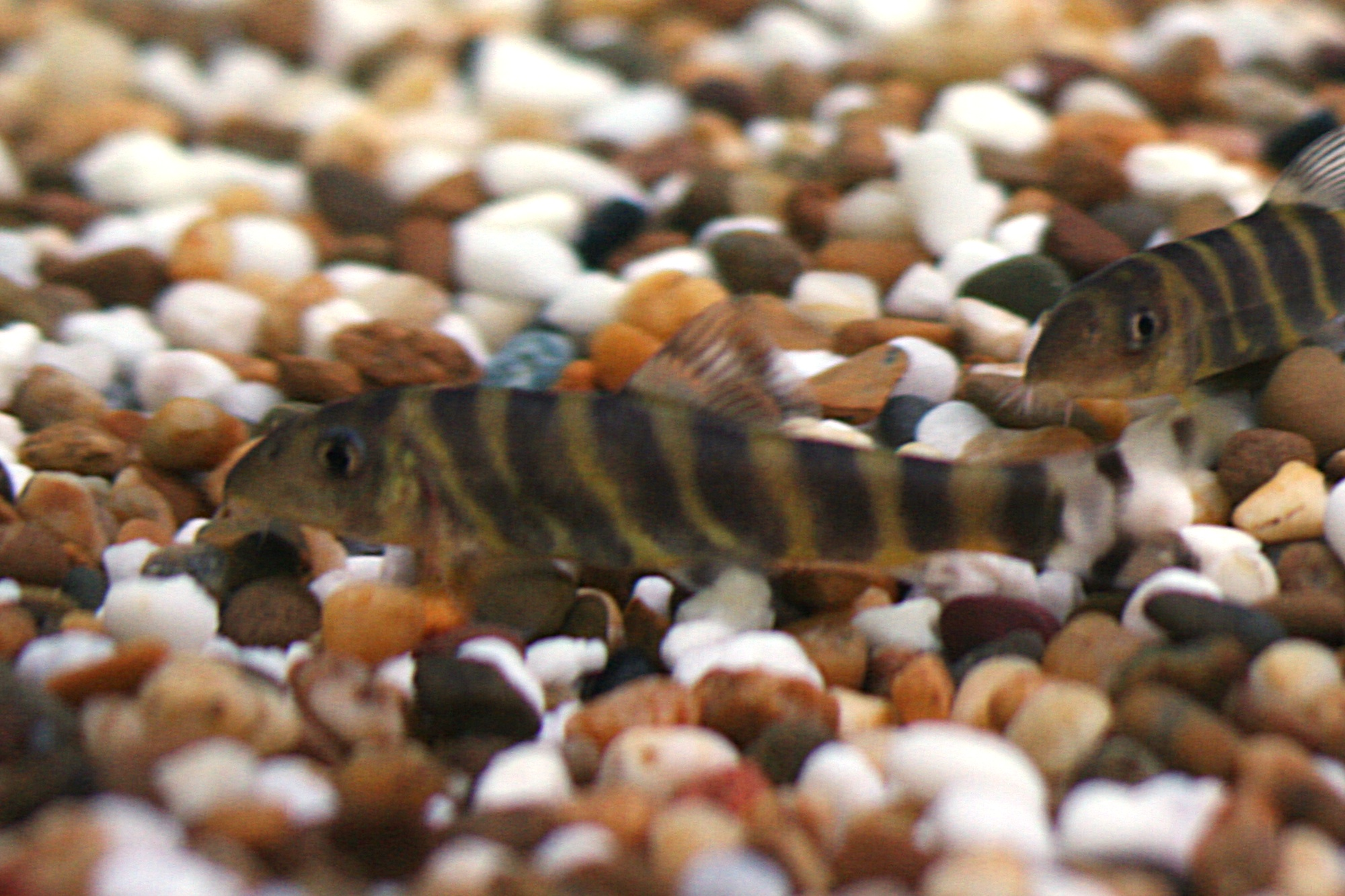

Conservation status
- Least Concern (IUCN 3.1)

Scientific classification
- Kingdom: Animalia
- Phylum: Chordata
- Class: Actinopterygii
- Division: Teleostei
- Order: Cypriniformes
- Family: Botiidae
- Genus: Botia
- Species: B. dario

Binomial name
- Botia dario (F. Hamilton, 1822)

Synonyms
- Cobitis dario Hamilton, 1822; Cobitis geto Hamilton, 1822; Botia geto (Hamilton, 1822); Canthophrys zebra Swainson, 1839; Diacanthus zebra (Swainson, 1839); Canthophrys flavicauda Swainson, 1839; Diacanthus flavicauda (Swainson, 1839); Botia macrolineata Teugels, De Vos & Snoeks, 1986

= Botia dario =

Bengal loach

Species of fish

Botia dario (Bengal loach or queen loach) is a species of fish in the loach family Botiidae found in the Brahmaputra and Ganges basins in Bangladesh, Bhutan and northern India. The species is overall widespread.

In Bangladesh, B. dario is threatened by pesticide used in the cultivation of rice. Since 1997, the Bangladesh government has enforced strict penalties against polluters, with specific rules about the pollution of streams and waterways.

B. dario can be found in the creeks and streams of the northern and eastern regions of the country (bordering India and Myanmar, respectively). The fish most likely populates the streams that supply the Bengal section of the Ganges River. B. dario is also reported in Bhutan, but only in the Gaylegphug River, which eventually drains into the far north of Bangladesh.

== In the aquarium ==
Botia dario is a popular fish to have in tropical aquariums, quickly taking care of pest snail populations and less shy than B. striata. They get as long as 6 inches (150 mm) and are commonly kept in groups of 4 or more. They are omnivores and are fed sinking pellets as well as algae wafers. They also enjoy fresh vegetables, such as cucumber, zucchini, and frozen foods like bloodworms and brine shrimp.
