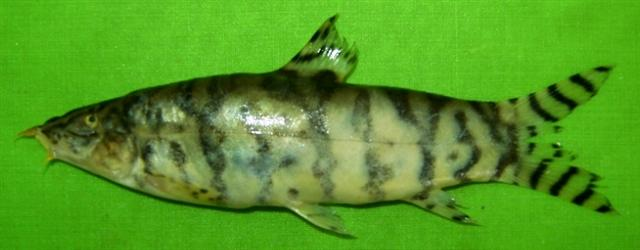

Conservation status
- Vulnerable (IUCN 3.1)

Scientific classification
- Kingdom: Animalia
- Phylum: Chordata
- Class: Actinopterygii
- Order: Cypriniformes
- Family: Botiidae
- Genus: Botia
- Species: B. rostrata

Binomial name
- Botia rostrata Günther, 1868

Synonyms
- Botia dayi Hora, 1932

= Botia rostrata =

Twin-banded loach

Species of fish

Botia rostrata, the Gangetic loach, ladder loach, or twin-banded loach, is a freshwater fish belonging to the loach family Botiidae. It originates in calmer water pool areas of highland streams in the lower Ganges and Brahmaputra basins in Bangladesh and north India. Records from elsewhere are believed to be misidentification of relatives (e.g., B. histrionica).

== In the aquarium ==
B. rostrata can reach a length of up to 11–12 cm (4.3–4.7 in). It needs to be in a group of five or more to create a pecking order and is never seen when kept singly. During fighting or feeding time a larger specimen of this fish may be seen graying out (darkening in body) as a dominance behavior. It likes having plenty of hiding spots and crannies to cram into, so rocks and wood are needed.
