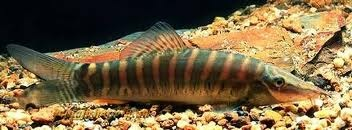

Conservation status
- Least Concern (IUCN 3.1)

Scientific classification
- Kingdom: Animalia
- Phylum: Chordata
- Class: Actinopterygii
- Order: Cypriniformes
- Family: Botiidae
- Genus: Syncrossus
- Species: S. helodes

Binomial name
- Syncrossus helodes (Sauvage, 1876)

Synonyms
- Botia helodes Sauvage, 1876

= Syncrossus helodes =

Species of fish

Syncrossus helodes, commonly known as banded loach, tiger botia or lesser katy loach, is a freshwater fish in the loach family Botiidae. It is native to rivers in Vietnam, Thailand, Laos and Cambodia. S. helodes resembles S. hymenophysa from Borneo, Sumatra and Peninsular Malaysia, and the two have frequently been confused. It differs from the latter species by the absence of a dark spot on the dorsal fin, 10–12 bars on body without blue borders (instead of 12–15 blue-bordered bars) and the presence of irregular dark markings on the lower body.

== Description ==
It is the largest member of the tiger botia group, which like its close relatives, is aggressive and unsuitable for community aquariums. This species, like other Syncrossus, must be maintained in groups of five or more in order to spread any aggression and to allow the fish to form a natural hierarchy.

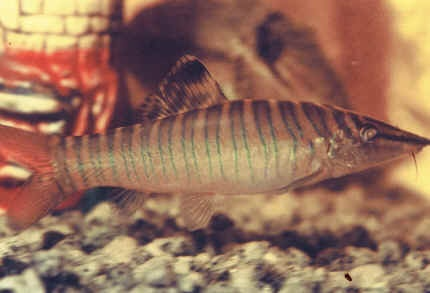
Syncrossus hymenophysa, commonly known as green tiger loach, often confused with lesser katy loach

This species has been known to grow up to 25–30 cm (9.8–11.8 in) long. Its preferred water parameters are pH of 7.0 or below; hardness: Soft and slightly acidic is best; dGH: < 12 degrees. This fish thrives in temperatures of 77 to 86 °F (25 to 30 °C). Syncrossus helodes loses some of its young colouration as it matures.

== Reproduction ==
Mature females probably have a rounder abdomen compared to males. Breeding is not known to have occurred in aquaria. Presumably a seasonal, migratory spawner in nature.
