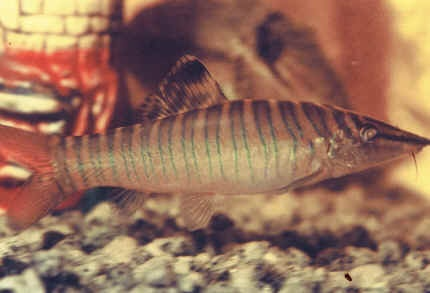

Scientific classification
- Kingdom: Animalia
- Phylum: Chordata
- Class: Actinopterygii
- Order: Cypriniformes
- Family: Botiidae
- Genus: Syncrossus
- Species: S. hymenophysa

Binomial name
- Syncrossus hymenophysa (Bleeker, 1852)

Synonyms
- Cobitis hymenophysa Bleeker, 1852; Botia hymenophysa (Bleeker, 1852); Hymenophysa macclellandi Bleeker, 1859

= Syncrossus hymenophysa =

Species of fish

Syncrossus hymenophysa, commonly known as the tiger loach, tiger botia or green tiger loach, is a species of freshwater fish in the loach family Botiidae. It is native to fast mountain streams and large rivers, over soft substrates and often near submerged boulders and fallen trees, in Peninsular Malaysia, Borneo and Sumatra. Unlike most loaches, S. hymenophysa is very aggressive, especially when food is added to the tank.

== Description ==
S. hymenophysa grows up to 10 in (25 cm) long. A mature female tends to have a rounder abdomen. This species can be easily mistaken for S. helodes, with the difference being the direction of stripes in front of the dorsal fin. The stripes start at the dorsal base and go down, finishing inclined towards the head of S. hymenophysa, but the opposite for S. helodes.

== Distribution and habitat ==
Green tiger loaches are native to rivers and streams in Peninsular Malaysia, as well as the islands of Sumatra and Borneo. The preferred water conditions for this fish are a neutral (7) to slightly acidic (6.5) pH, and temperatures ranging from 77 to 86 °F (25 to 30 °C).

== Tank compatibility ==
In an aquarium, only one S. hymenophysa should be kept per tank, and fed live or frozen foods, unless room is ample for five or more specimens. As with other aggressive fish, having a larger group and breaks in sight lines across the tank can disperse aggression throughout the group, but this does not guarantee peaceful interactions. This species, like other Syncrossus, must be maintained in groups to allow the fish to form a natural hierarchy.
