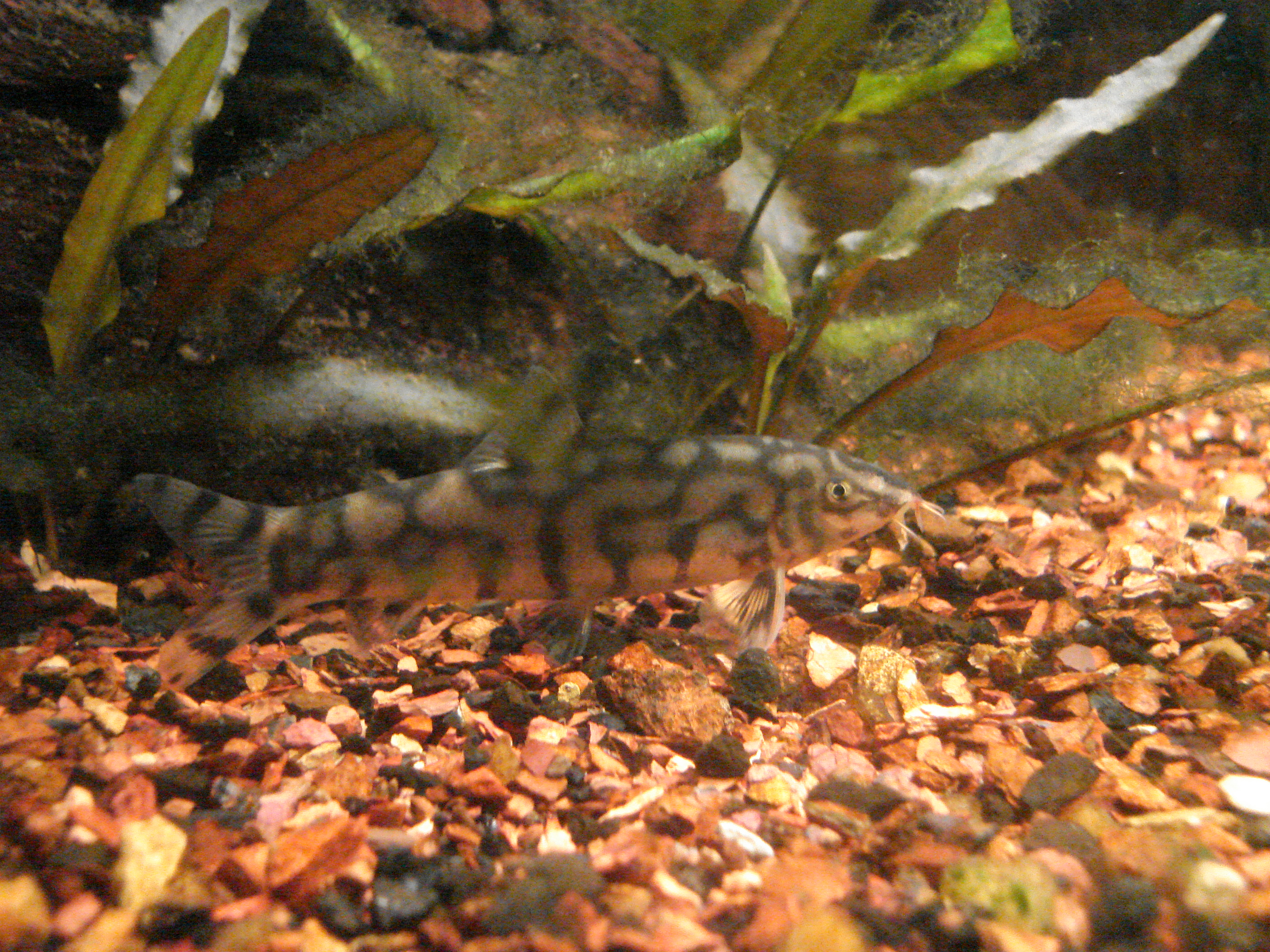
- Typical aquarium specimen labelled as Botia almorhae, but these are likely a related species (see text).
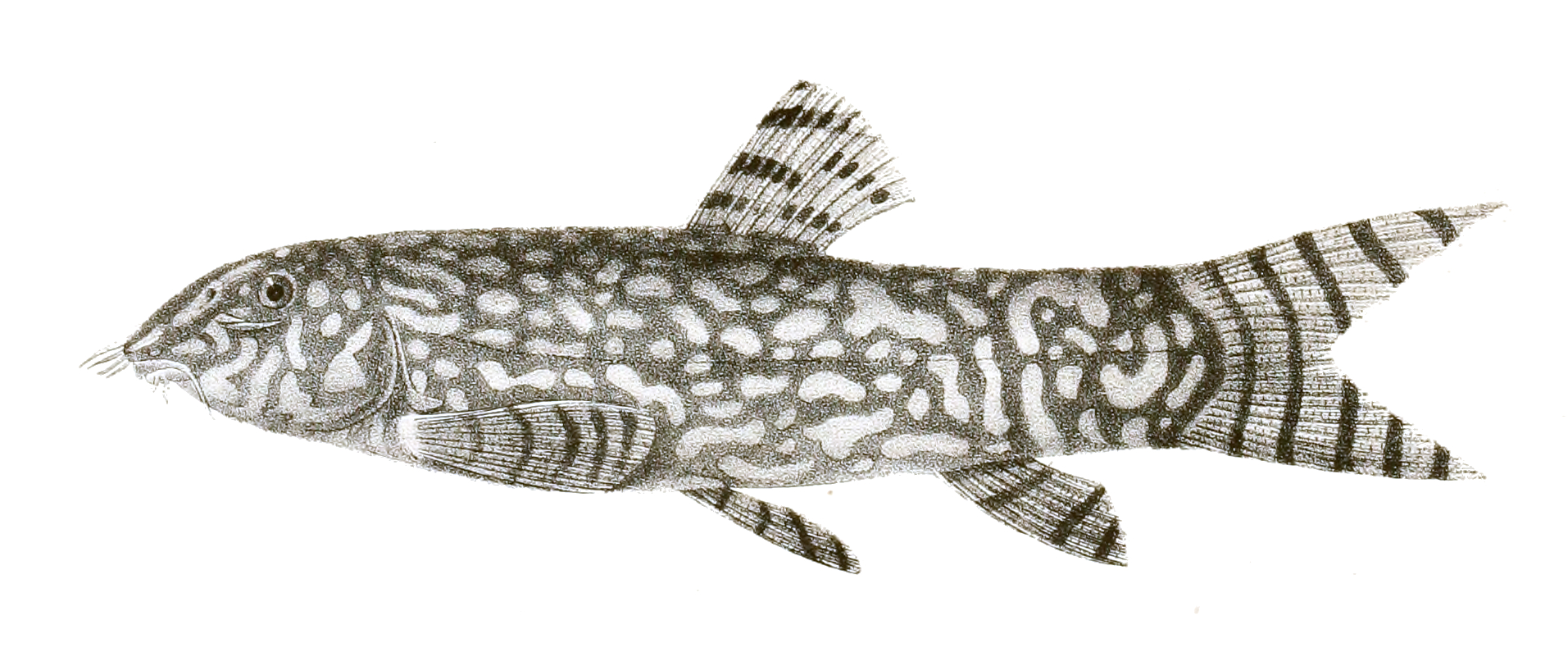

Conservation status
- Least Concern (IUCN 3.1)

Scientific classification
- Kingdom: Animalia
- Phylum: Chordata
- Class: Actinopterygii
- Order: Cypriniformes
- Family: Botiidae
- Genus: Botia
- Species: B. almorhae

Binomial name
- Botia almorhae J. E. Gray, 1831

Synonyms
- Botia grandi Gray, 1832

= Yoyo loach =

Species of fish

The yoyo loach, Almora loach or Pakistani loach (Botia almorhae) is a freshwater fish belonging to the loach family Botiidae. It originates in the slow-running and still waters of the Ganges basin in northern India and possibly Nepal. Despite the alternative common name Pakistani loach, the true B. almorhae is not known from Pakistan (the species in this country is B. birdi).

It may attain a length of 14–16 cm (5.5–6.3 in), and is named for its dark and pale patterns, which often can be seen to spell "yoyo" (especially in smaller/younger specimens), hence the common name yoyo loach. The final common name, Almora loach, refers to Almora in Uttarakhand, India. Specimens labelled as B. almorhae are commonly found in the aquarium trade, but most (if not all) of these appear to be the closely related B. lohachata, two possibly undescribed species popularly referred to as B. sp. "Kosi" and B. sp. "Teesta", or hybrids.

== See also ==
- List of freshwater aquarium fish species
