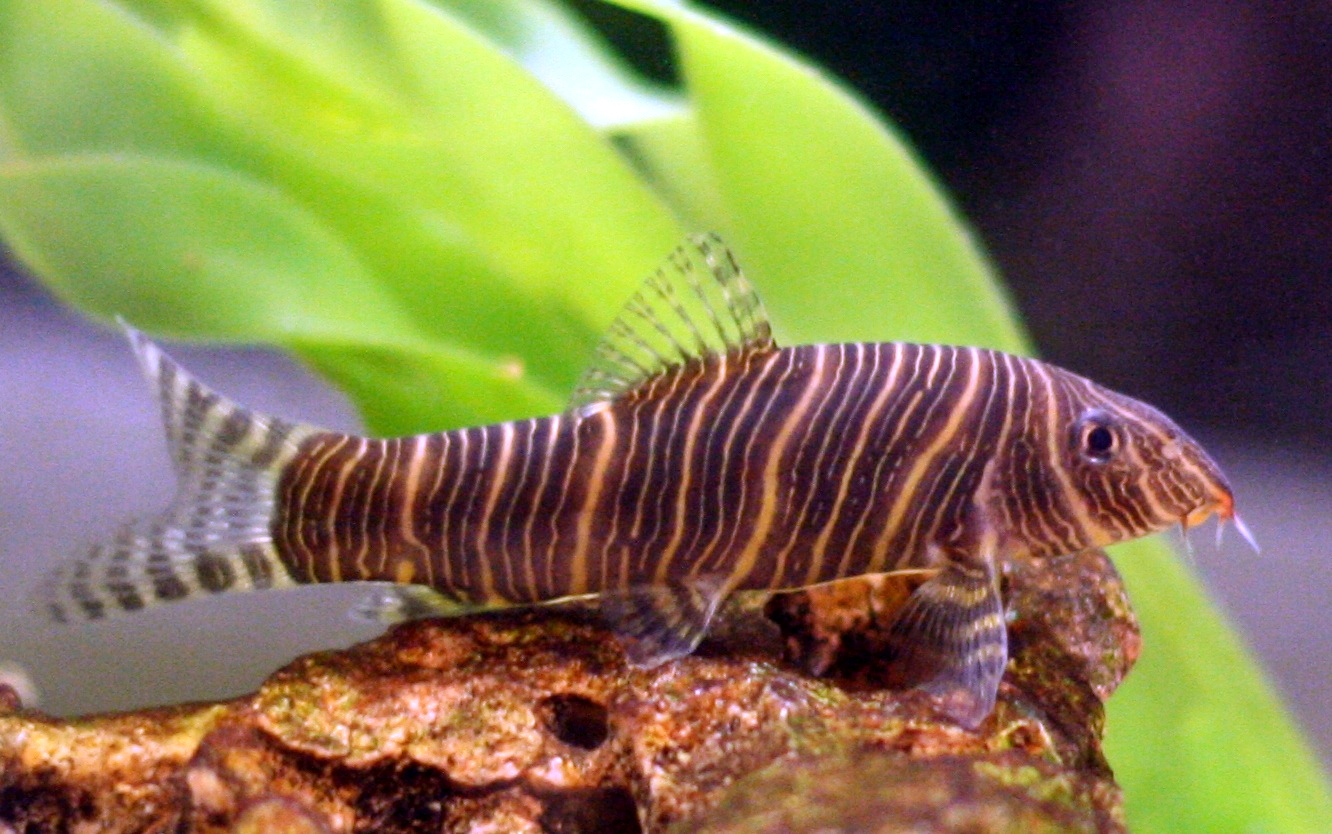
- Botia striata

Scientific classification
- Kingdom: Animalia
- Phylum: Chordata
- Class: Actinopterygii
- Division: Teleostei
- Order: Cypriniformes
- Family: Botiidae
- Genus: Botia; J. E. Gray, 1831

Type species
- Botia almorhae Gray, 1831

Species
- See text

Synonyms
- Diacantha Swainson, 1839; Hymenphysa McClelland, 1839

= Botia =

Genus of fishes

Botia (Indian loaches) is a genus of freshwater fish in the loach family (Botiidae). It was a large genus with about 20 species. In 2004 Maurice Kottelat proposed in his paper (along with the description of Botia kubotai, see References below) to divide the genus into four related genera based on fish appearance and locality:

- Botia for Indian loaches (shorter body).
- Chromobotia for clown loach.
- Syncrossus for tiger loaches (elongated body).
- Yasuhikotakia for Mekong loaches (shorter body).

Another genus, Parabotia, was considered a separate genus earlier. It has an elongated body quite similar to Syncrossus, but with its range mostly restricted to China. With all these as separate genera, Botia species are restricted to South Asia (including Burma).

The fish in these genera possess a pair of razor-sharp spines under their eye sockets. These spines normally lie flat, but may be extended when the loach feels threatened. This behavior is rarely observed when the fish is swimming, but care must be taken when catching botia in fishnets — the projecting spines may become entangled, causing injury to the fish and/or damage to the net. Care must also be taken when transporting the larger botia, as their subocular spines may puncture the enclosing polyethylene bags that are normally used for this purpose.

One special characteristic of this loach group is the ability to produce a loud "clicking" noise, which is commonly heard during feeding time. This noise stems from a special type of pharyngeal teeth that are used to extract snails from their shells. For aquarists, this gives the botia a practical application, as they can be used to fight a snail infestation.

Another peculiarity of Botia is that they are often seen resting on their side or in other strange positions. While this can be normal, healthy behaviour for botia, it is rarely observed in other types of fish. The unusual habit often causes needless panic for the inexperienced aquarist, who mistakenly assumes their fish is ill.

== Species ==
There are currently nine recognized species in this genus:

Image	Scientific name	Common name	Distribution
	Botia almorhae J. E. Gray, 1831	Almorha loach, Yo-yo loach, Pakistani loach	Ganges basin in northern India and possibly Nepal
]	Botia birdi B. L. Chaudhuri, 1909	Birdi loach	India and Pakistan
	Botia dario (F. Hamilton, 1822)	Bengal loach, Queen loach	the Brahmaputra and Ganges basins in Bangladesh, Bhutan and north India
	Botia histrionica Blyth, 1860	Golden zebra loach	India and Myanmar. Found in Salween basin
	Botia kubotai Kottelat, 2004	Burmese Border loach	Myanmar
	Botia lohachata B. L. Chaudhuri, 1912	Reticulate loach	Pakistan, India, Bangladesh and Nepal.
	Botia rostrata Günther, 1868	Gangetic loach, Sergeant major loach	Bangladesh and north India
	Botia striata Narayan Rao, 1920	Zebra loach	Western Ghats of India
	Botia udomritthiruji H. H. Ng, 2007	Emperor loach	south Burma.
