= Sinibotia =

Scientific classification
- Kingdom: Animalia
- Phylum: Chordata
- Class: Actinopterygii
- Division: Teleostei
- Order: Cypriniformes
- Family: Botiidae
- Genus: Sinibotia; P. W. Fang, 1936

Type species
- Botia (Hymenophysa) superciliaris Günther, 1892

Genus of fishes

Sinibotia is a genus of loaches found in rivers and streams of eastern Asia, specifically southeast China, Laos, Vietnam and east Thailand.

== Species ==
There are currently seven recognized species in this genus:

- Sinibotia lani Wu & Yang, 2019
- Sinibotia longiventralis (J. X. Yang & Y. R. Chen, 1992)
- Sinibotia pulchra (H. W. Wu, 1939)
- Sinibotia reevesae (H. W. Chang, 1944)
- Sinibotia robusta (H. W. Wu, 1939)
- Sinibotia superciliaris (Günther, 1892)
- Sinibotia zebra (H. W. Wu, 1939)
