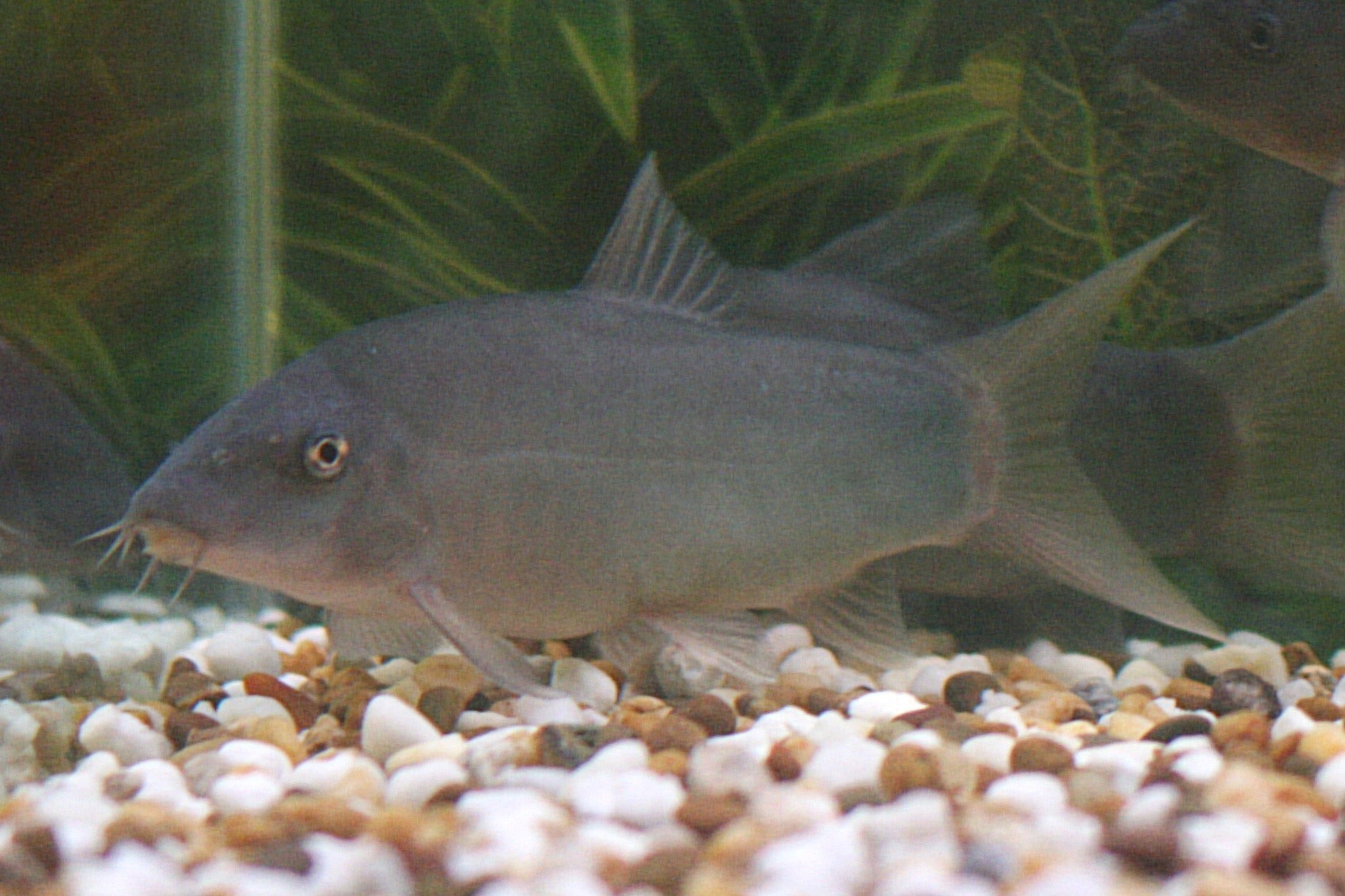
- Yasuhikotakia modesta

Scientific classification
- Domain: Eukaryota
- Kingdom: Animalia
- Phylum: Chordata
- Class: Actinopterygii
- Order: Cypriniformes
- Family: Botiidae
- Genus: Yasuhikotakia; Nalbant, 2002

Type species
- Botia modesta Bleeker, 1864

= Yasuhikotakia =

Genus of fishes

Yasuhikotakia (Mekong loaches) is a genus of botiid loaches, many which are popular aquarium fish. It is named in honor of Japanese collector/researcher Dr. Yasuhiko Taki. This genus has been separated from the genus Botia in the paper by Maurice Kottelat in 2004.

Fishes of the genus Yasuhikotakia are found inhabiting river systems in Indochina such as the Mekong, Chao Phraya, and Mae Klong.

== Species ==
There are currently seven recognized species in this genus: Two additional species formerly included in this genus have been moved to Ambastaia.

- Yasuhikotakia caudipunctata (Y. Taki & A. Doi, 1995)
- Yasuhikotakia eos (Y. Taki, 1972) (Sun loach)
- Yasuhikotakia lecontei (Fowler, 1937) (Silver loach)
- Yasuhikotakia longidorsalis (Y. Taki & A. Doi, 1995)
- Yasuhikotakia modesta (Bleeker, 1864) (Redtail botia)
- Yasuhikotakia morleti (Tirant, 1885) (Skunk botia)
- Yasuhikotakia splendida (T. R. Roberts, 1995)
