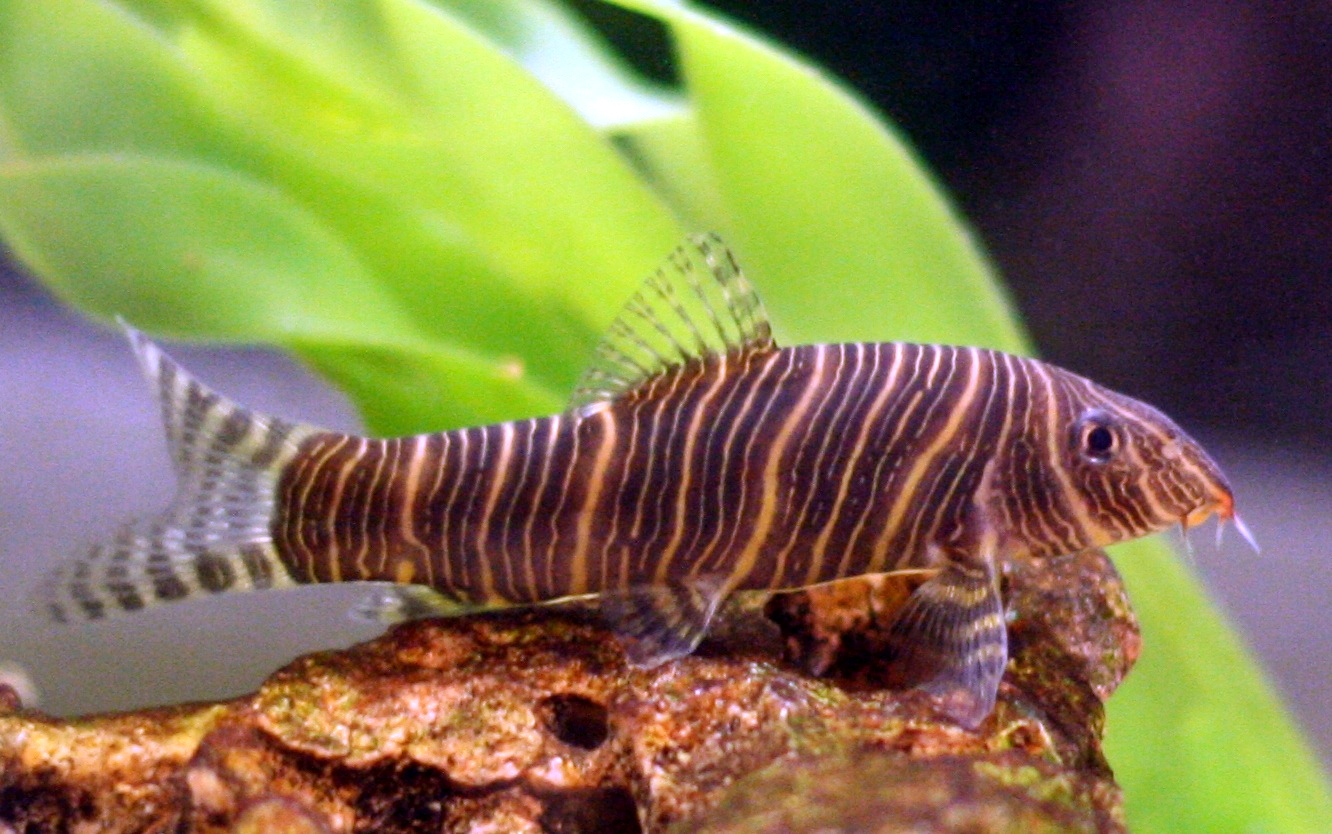

Conservation status
- Endangered (IUCN 3.1)

Scientific classification
- Kingdom: Animalia
- Phylum: Chordata
- Class: Actinopterygii
- Division: Teleostei
- Order: Cypriniformes
- Family: Botiidae
- Genus: Botia
- Species: B. striata

Binomial name
- Botia striata Narayan Rao, 1920

Synonyms
- Botia striatus (Narayan Rao, 1920); Botia striata kolhapurensis (Kalawar & Kelkar, 1956); Botia dayi (non Hora, 1932)

= Zebra loach =

Species of fish

The zebra loach (Botia striata) is a freshwater loach endemic to a small area within the rivers and streams of the Western Ghats in India. They are a source of food and income to the Katkari people, and a popular aquarium fish loved for their dazzling appearance.

== Physical Description ==
The first description of B. striata was published in 1920 by Indian Zoologist C R Narayan Rao, stating that:

"The color of this Loach is most beautiful. The body is diversified by broad dark and narrow yellow bands, which from behind the nape form oblique hoops directed backwards."

The fish takes on a fusiform shape, with a body approximately as tall as their heads are long. They have an inferior positioned mouth lined by 4 pairs of barbels, and while they are sexually dimorphic, the differences are subtle – females tend to be larger, reaching sexual maturity at a size of approximately 6.15 cm from the tip of the snout to the end of the tail. In addition, males have enlarged pectoral fins. The largest zebra loach recorded was 9.5cm (3.74") from the tip of the snout to the base of the tail. Some are found with variations in their striping, taking on twisted or reticulated patterns.

== Geographic Range and Distribution ==
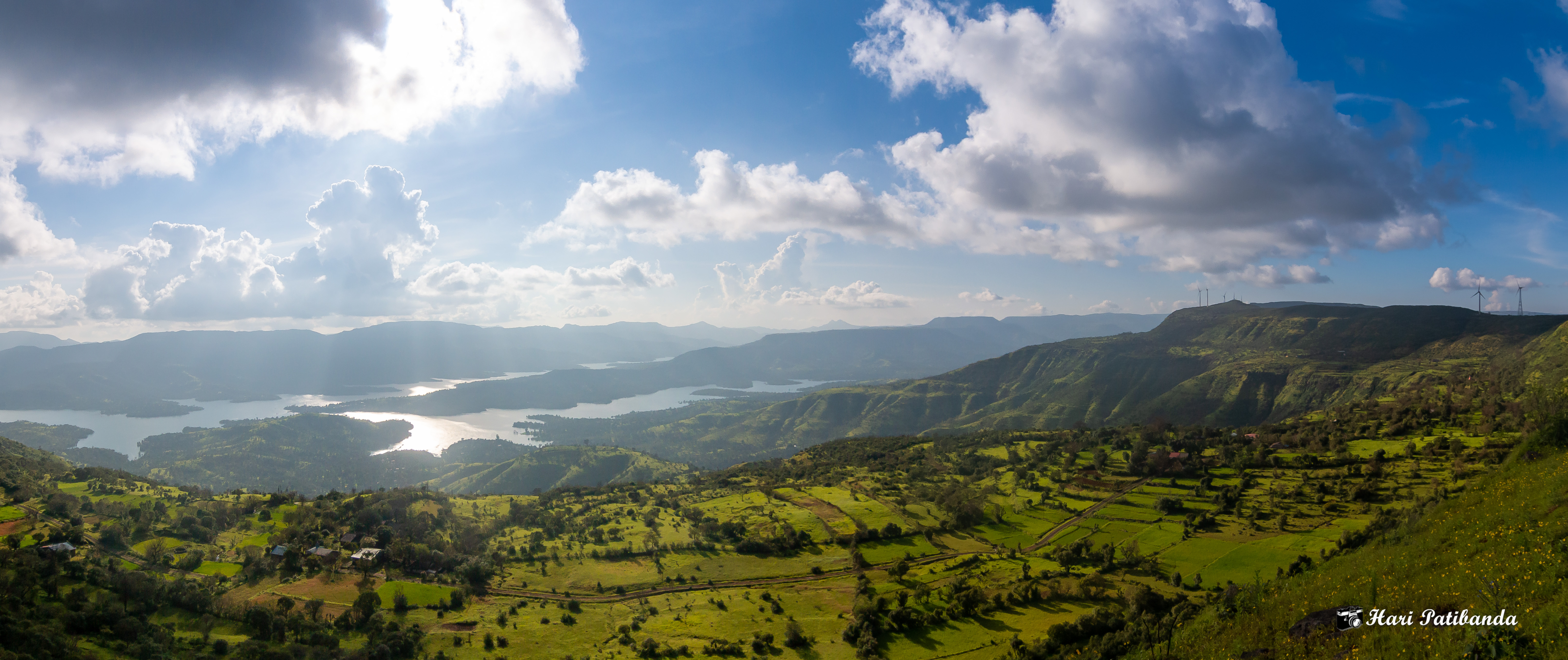
View of the Koyna River near Kas Patthar in the Western Ghats, India

The Western Ghats is one of the most bio-diverse regions in the world, known for its tropical evergreen forests and designation as an UNESCO World Heritage Site. The area experiences two seasons, a 3 month monsoon season and a 9 month dry season.

The zebra loach's range is restricted to four different rivers: the Tunga and Bhadra rivers of Karnataka, and the Panchganga river and Koyna river in the state of Maharashtra. Overall, their entire distribution is inside of an area about 400km² in size.

=== Population and conservation status ===
According to the IUCN, the zebra loach is endangered due to habitat alteration from deforestation and pollution combined with their small geographic range. Little is known about their actual population size, but generally they are thought to be in decline given their Red List status and the high number of wild specimens exported every year. Few conservation efforts are underway, but at least part of their habitat is protected within the Koyna Wildlife Sanctuary.

=== Habitat, and Ecology ===
They are known to inhabit clear mountain streams, preferring waterways with pebble or gravel beds. They are found in water with a pH between 6.0 - 8.0, dH between 5-12, and temperatures from 23 - 26°C. Zebra loaches are omnivores, feeding on phytoplankton and crustaceans within the substrate. B. striata lives amongst many other popular aquarium fish, such as Devario aequipinnatus.

== Presence in Aquarium Hobby and Care ==
=== Popularity ===
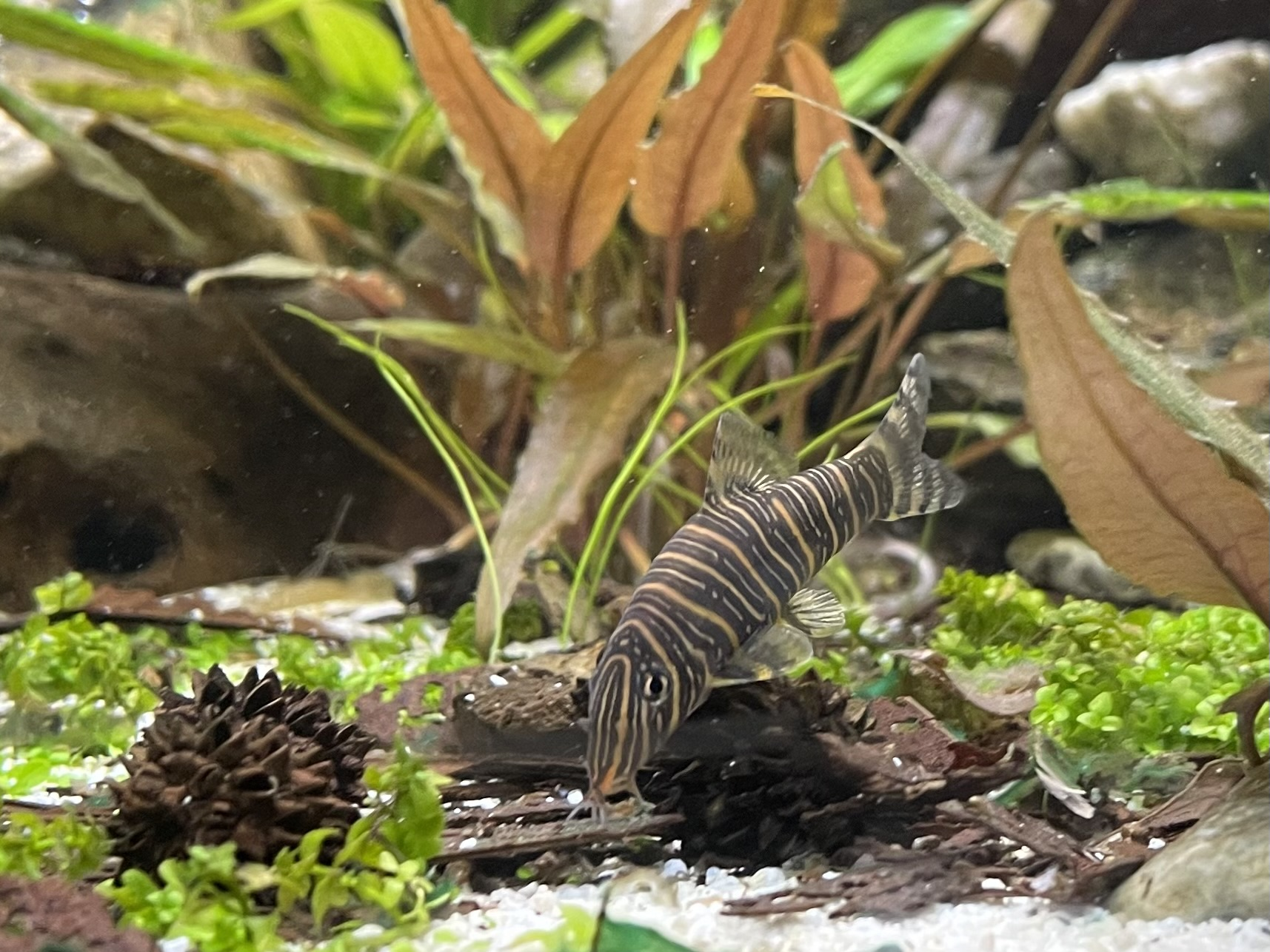
Zebra loach (B. Striata) with a unique pattern in an aquarium

Zebra loaches first appeared in the global aquarium trade during 1952, and are popular in the trade today. As many as 382,575 individuals were exported from India between 2005 - 2012, and as many as 265,610 individuals were exported between April 2012 to March 2017. These figures are likely underestimates and are worrisome in the context of their endangered status.

Aquarists interested in keeping zebra loach specimens are strongly advised to investigate the source of locally available fishes, and to only purchase those known to be captive-bred.

=== Care Requirements ===
==== Water Quality ====
They are fairly hardy fish that can thrive in most healthy tropical aquarium environments, with a pH between 6.0 and 8.0, and temperatures from 23 - 26°C. They do best with clean, well oxygenated water.

==== Environment ====
They prefer aquariums at least 75 liters (20 gallons) in size with sandy substrates and lots of places of hide.

==== Diet ====
B. striata will accept a wide variety of fish foods, including live food, such as tubifex, blackworms, snails, and small shrimp, most commercial brands of fish food, and vegetables like spinach or zucchini. They prefer a diet high in crude protein (40%+), and it has been shown that feeding four times a day increases their growth rate and potentially reduces stress.

==== Temperament ====
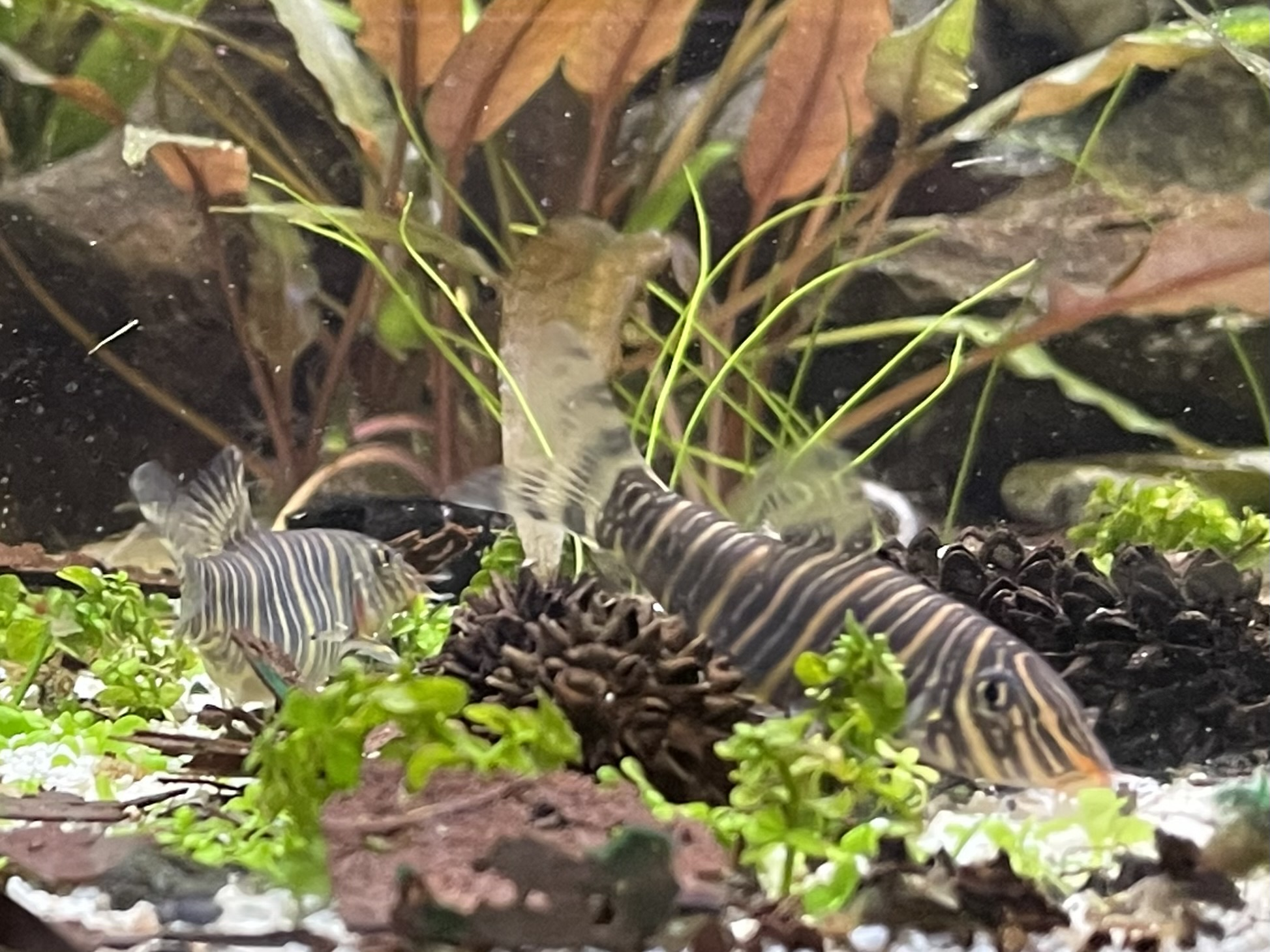
Two zebra loaches (B. striata) together in an aquarium

Zebra loaches are peaceful fish suitable to tropical, freshwater community aquariums. They should be kept in groups of at least five, and need many different places to hide to be able to thrive. This species is quite shy, and may spend much of its time hiding outside of feeding times.

They exhibit shoaling behaviors, forming complex social hierarchies, often centered around food. Dominant, larger ones in the shoal can often be observed jostling for leadership. Their behavior is fairly similar to other common loaches, like clown loaches and yoyo loaches. They can be boisterous, but rarely exhibit aggression towards other tank mates. They are not typically compatible with slower moving fish like bettas, as their obnoxious behavior can cause a lot of stress to fish that appreciate a calmer environment.

==== Breeding ====
Home aquarium breeding is unknown, but the species is bred on a commercial basis with the use of hormones.
