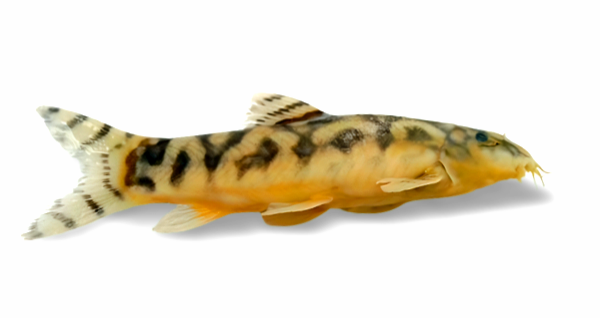

Conservation status
- Least Concern (IUCN 3.1)

Scientific classification
- Kingdom: Animalia
- Phylum: Chordata
- Class: Actinopterygii
- Order: Cypriniformes
- Family: Botiidae
- Genus: Botia
- Species: B. birdi

Binomial name
- Botia birdi Chaudhuri, 1909

= Botia birdi =

Species of fish

Botia birdi, the Birdi loach, inhabits freshwater environments and is commonly found in India and Pakistan, particularly within the Indus drainage system.
