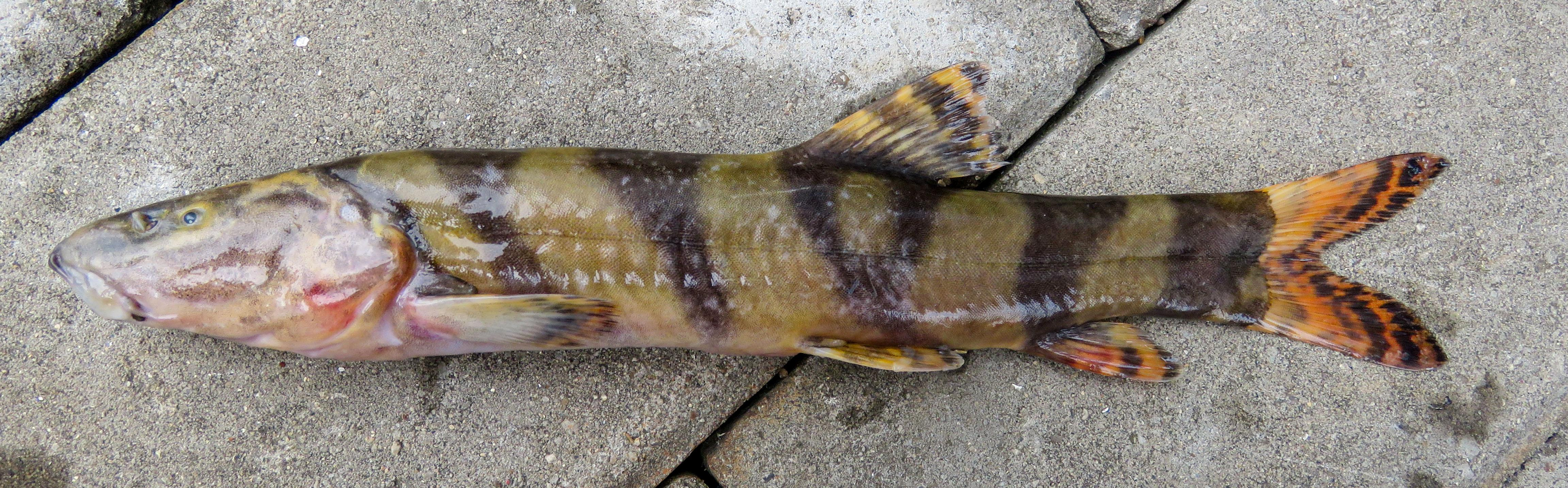

Conservation status
- Vulnerable (IUCN 3.1)

Scientific classification
- Kingdom: Animalia
- Phylum: Chordata
- Class: Actinopterygii
- Division: Teleostei
- Order: Cypriniformes
- Family: Botiidae
- Genus: Leptobotia
- Species: L. elongata

Binomial name
- Leptobotia elongata (Bleeker, 1870)

Synonyms
- Botia elongata Bleeker, 1870

= Leptobotia elongata =

Species of fish

Leptobotia elongata, the imperial flower loach, elongate loach or royal clown loach, is a species of botiid fish found in flowing water in the upper and middle Yangtze basin in China. It is the largest species in the family, reaching up to 50 cm (1.6 ft) in length and 3 kg (6 lb 10 oz) in weight. Formerly common, the numbers of this Vulnerable species have declined because of overfishing, dams (limiting its breeding migration), habitat loss and pollution. The species is bred in captivity and a stocking project has been in place since 2010. It is sometimes kept in aquariums, but require a very large tank.

Adults migrate upstream to spawn between March and May. They have been recorded feeding on fish, shrimp, gammarids, benthic invertebrates, aquatic insect larvae, mollusks, plankton and phytodetritus. The feeding preference depends on size: Individuals less than 11 cm (4.3 in) long mainly take benthic invertebrates and aquatic insect larvae, while larger individuals mainly feed on fish and shrimp.
