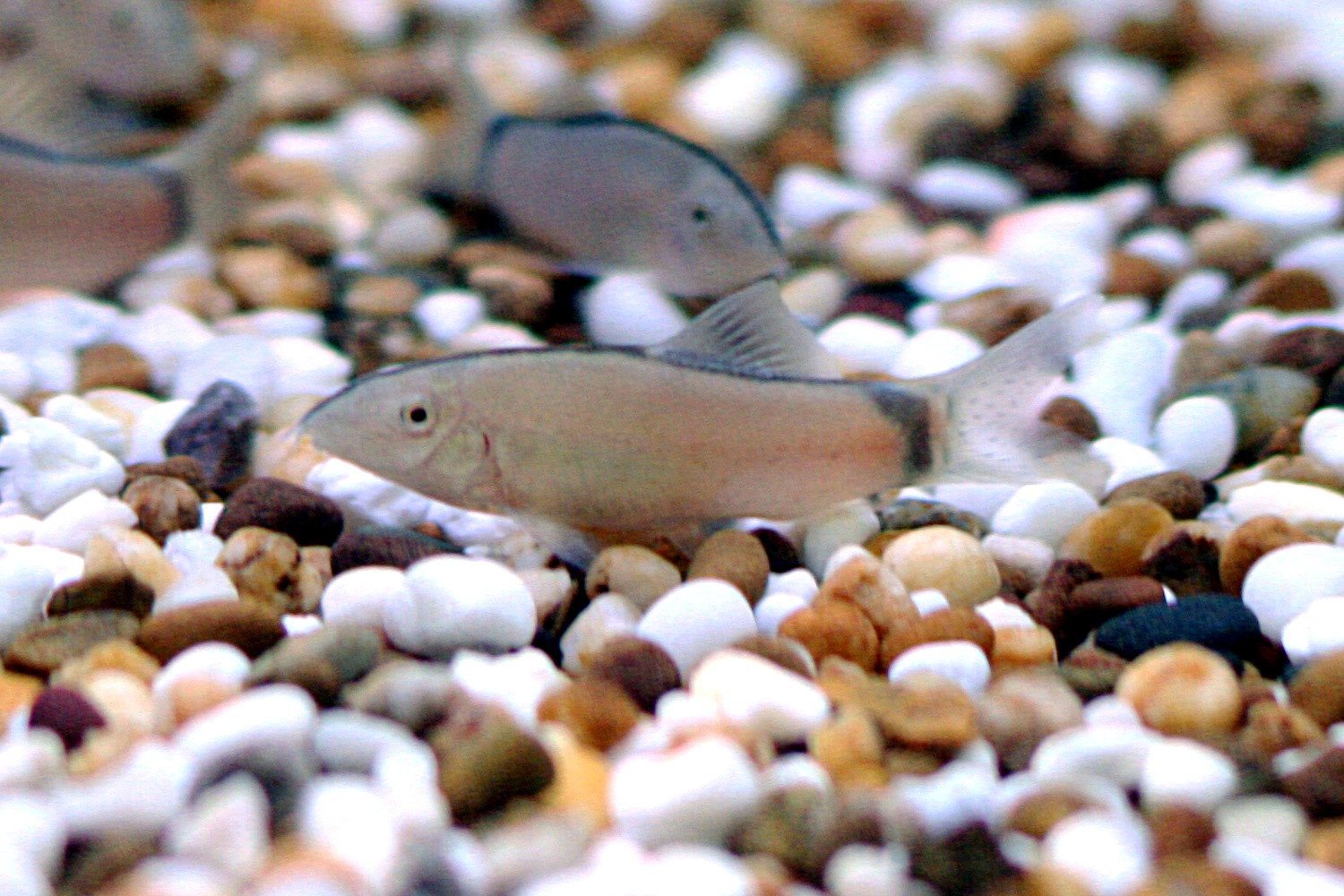

Conservation status
- Least Concern (IUCN 3.1)

Scientific classification
- Kingdom: Animalia
- Phylum: Chordata
- Class: Actinopterygii
- Order: Cypriniformes
- Family: Botiidae
- Genus: Yasuhikotakia
- Species: Y. morleti

Binomial name
- Yasuhikotakia morleti (Tirant, 1885)

Synonyms
- Botia morleti Tirant, 1885; Botia horae Smith, 1931

= Skunk loach =

Species of fish

The skunk loach, skunk botia or Hora's loach (Yasuhikotakia morleti; syn. Botia morleti, Botia horae) is a species of botiid loach found in the Mekong River basin in Indochina, as well as the Chao Phraya and Mae Klong basins in Thailand. Its maximum size is approximately 10 centimetres (3.9 in). The species occurs in medium to large rivers at temperatures of 26–30 °C (79–86 °F), pH 6.0 to 8.0, and hardness 5.0 to 12.0. It feeds on live crustaceans, insects, snails and other invertebrates.

== See also ==
- List of freshwater aquarium fish species
