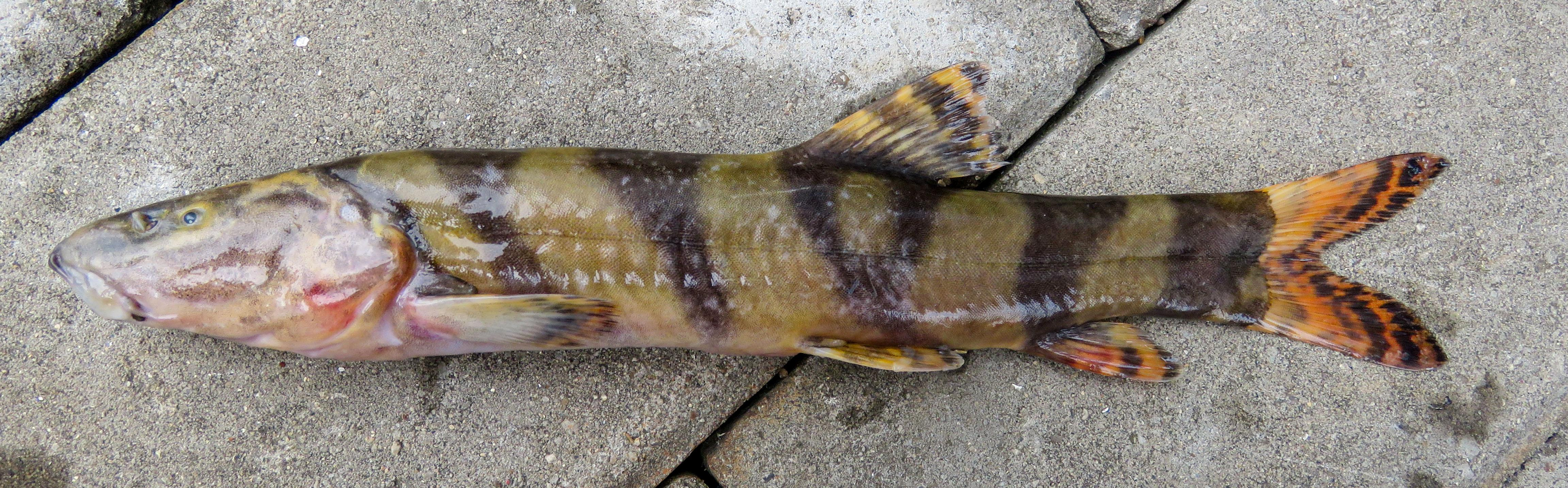
- Leptobotia elongata

Scientific classification
- Kingdom: Animalia
- Phylum: Chordata
- Class: Actinopterygii
- Division: Teleostei
- Order: Cypriniformes
- Family: Botiidae
- Genus: Leptobotia; Bleeker, 1870

Type species
- Botia elongata Bleeker, 1870

= Leptobotia =

Genus of fishes

Leptobotia is a genus of fish in the family Botiidae endemic to China.

== Species ==
There are currently 21 recognized species in this genus. In addition to these, Parabotia curtus was formerly included in Leptobotia.

- Leptobotia bellacauda Bohlen & Šlechtová, 2016
- Leptobotia brachycephala D.-M. Guo, E. Zhang, 2021
- Leptobotia citrauratea (Nichols, 1925)
- Leptobotia compressicauda (Nichols, 1931)
- Leptobotia elongata (Bleeker, 1870)
- Leptobotia flavolineata H.-Y. Wang, 1981
- Leptobotia guilinensis J.-X. Chen, 1980
- Leptobotia hansuiensis S.-M. Fang & T.-C.Hsu, 1980
- Leptobotia hengyangensis Huang, H.& Zhang, W., 1986
- Leptobotia micra Bohlen & Slechtová, 2017
- Leptobotia microphthalma T.-Y. Fu & M.-R.Ye, 1983
- Leptobotia orientalis T.-Q. Xu, S.-M. Fang & H.-Y. Wang, 1981
- Leptobotia paucipinna Guo, Cao & Zhang, 2023
- Leptobotia pellegrini P.-W. Fang, 1936
- Leptobotia posterodorsalis Lan & J.-X. Chen, 1992
- Leptobotia rotundilobus D.-M. Guo, Cao & E. Zhang, 2023
- Leptobotia punctata J. Li, X.-H. Li & X.-L. Chen, 2008
- Leptobotia rubrilabris (Dabry de Thiersant, 1872)
- Leptobotia taeniops (Sauvage, 1878)
- Leptobotia tchangi P.-W. Fang, 1936
- Leptobotia tientainensis (H.-W. Wu, 1930)
