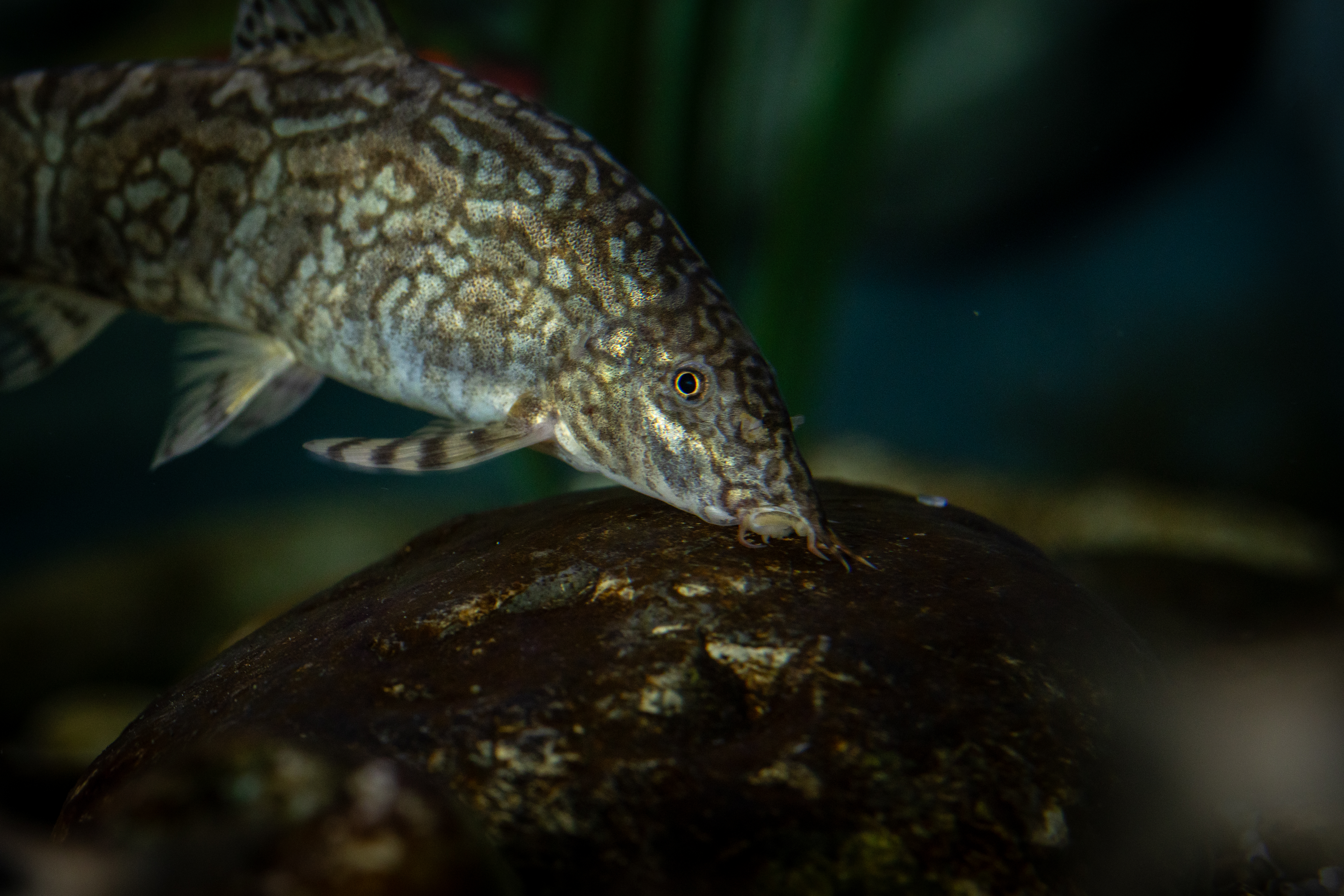

Conservation status
- Least Concern (IUCN 3.1)

Scientific classification
- Kingdom: Animalia
- Phylum: Chordata
- Class: Actinopterygii
- Order: Cypriniformes
- Family: Botiidae
- Genus: Botia
- Species: B. lohachata

Binomial name
- Botia lohachata B. L. Chaudhuri, 1912

= Botia lohachata =

Species of fish

Botia lohachata, the reticulate loach, painted loch or Pakistani loach, is a species of freshwater ray-finned fish belonging to the family Botiidae, the pointface loaches. This species is found in streams with rocky and gravel bottoms in Pakistan, India, Nepal and Bangladesh. Specimens labelled as B. lohachata are often found in the aquarium trade, but most of these appear to be the closely related B. almorhae. Their three Y-shaped bands – the first in front, the second below and the third behind the dorsal fin – and between each band in the middle of the flank a circular dot; this also leads to them often being referred to by the name "yoyo loach".
