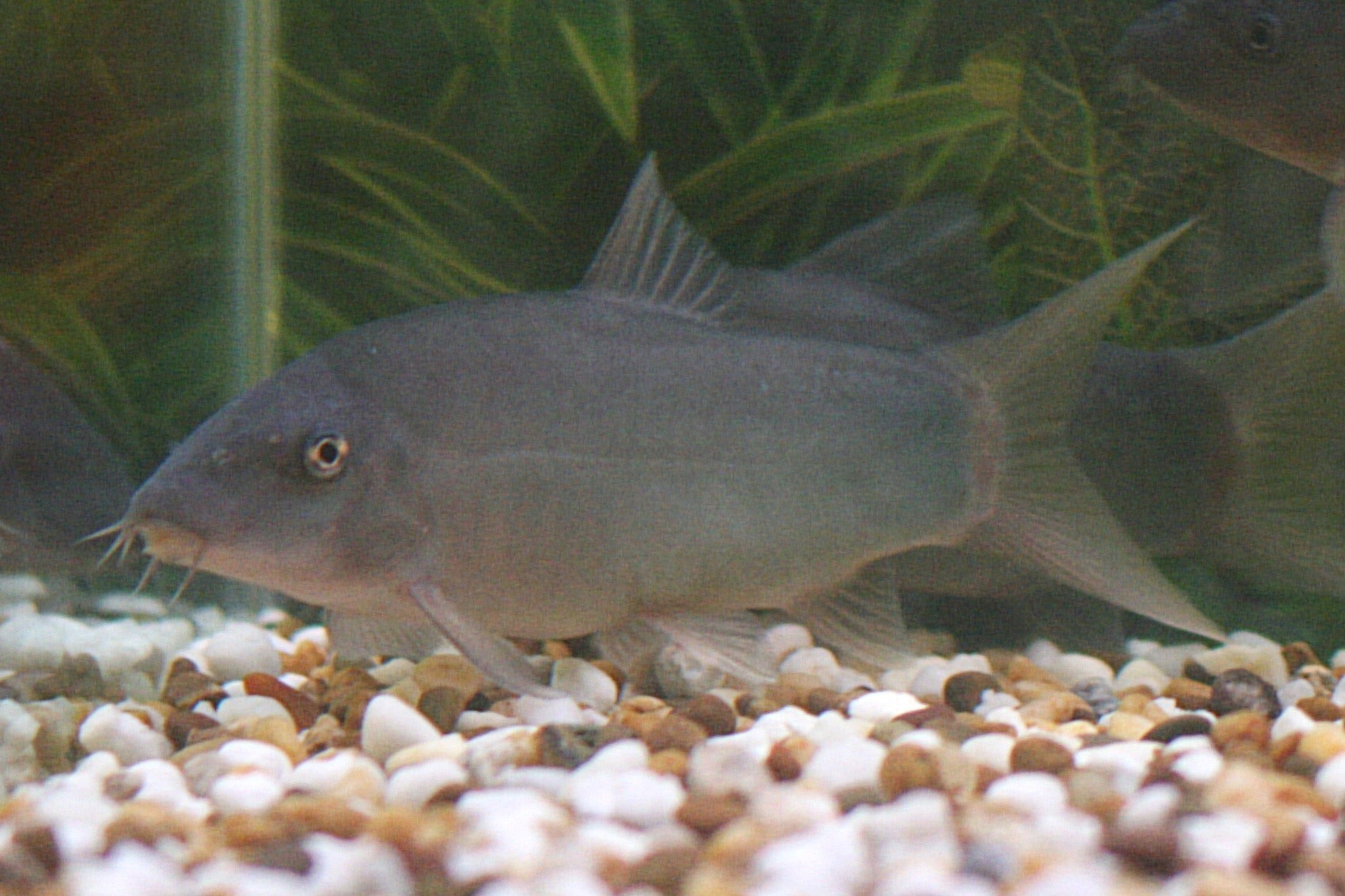

Conservation status
- Least Concern (IUCN 3.1)

Scientific classification
- Kingdom: Animalia
- Phylum: Chordata
- Class: Actinopterygii
- Order: Cypriniformes
- Family: Botiidae
- Genus: Yasuhikotakia
- Species: Y. modesta

Binomial name
- Yasuhikotakia modesta (Bleeker, 1864)

Synonyms
- Botia modesta Bleeker, 1864; Botia rubripinnis Sauvage, 1876

= Yasuhikotakia modesta =

Blue botia

Species of fish

Yasuhikotakia modesta (blue botia) is a tropical freshwater fish of the family Botiidae. It is native to large rivers in Thailand, Laos, Cambodia, and Vietnam. The blue botia is a widely available fish in the aquarium trade and can be purchased globally.

Other common names for this fish are red-finned loach, redtail botia, and colored botia.

== Distribution and habitat ==
Blue botias are widespread in eastern and central Indochina, notably in the Mekong River basin (including Tonlé Sap); the species is also found in the Chao Phraya, Bang Pakong and Mae Klong river basins of Thailand. The water usually has a muddy substrate, a neutral pH of 7.0, and the temperature averages 26 to 30 °C (79 to 86 °F).

== Description ==
The blue botia has a long, compact body and arched back similar to many other members of the family Botiidae including clown and yoyo loaches. Wild specimens have been found up to 25 centimetres (9.8 in) but those in captivity rarely grow larger than 18 centimetres (7.1 in).

The body is bluish-gray and the fins are red, orange, and in rare instances yellow. Immature specimens sometimes have a greenish tint to their bodies. Good health is indicated by bright coloration.

== Ecology ==
=== Behavior ===
Juvenile blue botias are active schooling fish. As they grow older, they spend more time hiding in caves or under rocks in solitude. Like many loaches, blue botias are a nocturnal species that comes out at night to dig through gravel and substrate for food. They are omnivorous, but prefer a meat-intensive diet of krill, bloodworms, Daphnia, earthworms and live insects. Like clown loaches (Chromobotia macracanthus), they sometimes make a loud clicking noise.

Groups of blue botias often create hierarchies with an alpha and omega member.
