= Volker Mahnert =

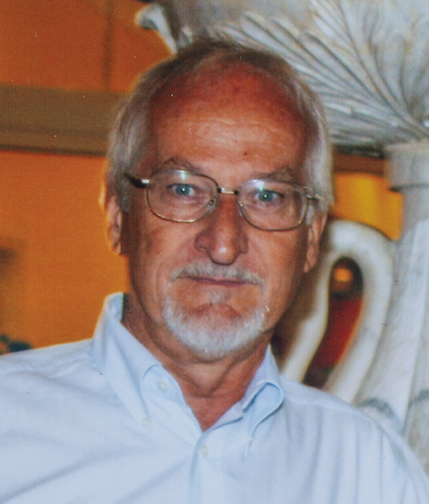
Volker Mahnert

Volker Mahnert (3 December 1943 in Innsbruck; † 23 November 2018 in Geneva) was an Austrian entomologist, arachnologist, ichthyologist and parasitologist. His research focused on pseudoscorpions.

== Life ==
Volker Mahnert was one of three sons of Klaus Mahnert and Hanna Mahnert, née Kindl. In 1971, under the supervision of Heinz Janetschek (1913–1997), he received his doctorate in philosophy from the University of Innsbruck with a dissertation on ento- and ectoparasites of small mammals of the Central Eastern Alps (North Tyrol).

In the same year, he moved to Switzerland and became a curator at the Department of Herpetology and Ichthyology at the Muséum d'histoire naturelle de la Ville de Genève. From 1989 to 2005 he was director of the museum. In 1991 he became an associate professor at the University of Geneva.

Volker Mahnert was the author or co-author of over 170 scientific articles. Most of them deal with the systematics and ecology of pseudoscorpions. He also worked on the taxonomy of fleas as well as African and South American tetras (Alestidae and Characidae).

Mahnert has been a member of the American Society of Arachnology, the British Society of Arachnology, the Society Suisse de Zoologie, the Swiss Entomological Society (SEG), the Société zoologique de France, the European Association of Zoological Nomenclature, the International Commission of Zoological Nomenclature (since 1991), the Biological Society of Washington, the Société Europénne d'Arachnologie, the New York Academy of Sciences and the Société internationale de biospéologie.

He served as president of the International Society of Arachnology between 1989 and 1992.

== Taxon described by him ==
- See Category:Taxa named by Volker Mahnert

== Publications ==
- Gery, Jacques; Mahnert, Volker (1986). "A new rummy-nose tetra from the Rio Negro, Brazil: Hemigrammus bleheri n.sp. (Characidae, Tetragonopterinae), with comments on Paracheirodon". Tropical Fish Hobbyist. 34 (11): 37–52. Retrieved 18 June 2020

== Dedication names ==
The loach species Schistura mahnerti was named in 1990 by Maurice Kottelat in honor of Volker Mahnert.

Halil Sarp named the mineral Mahnertite in his honour in 1995.

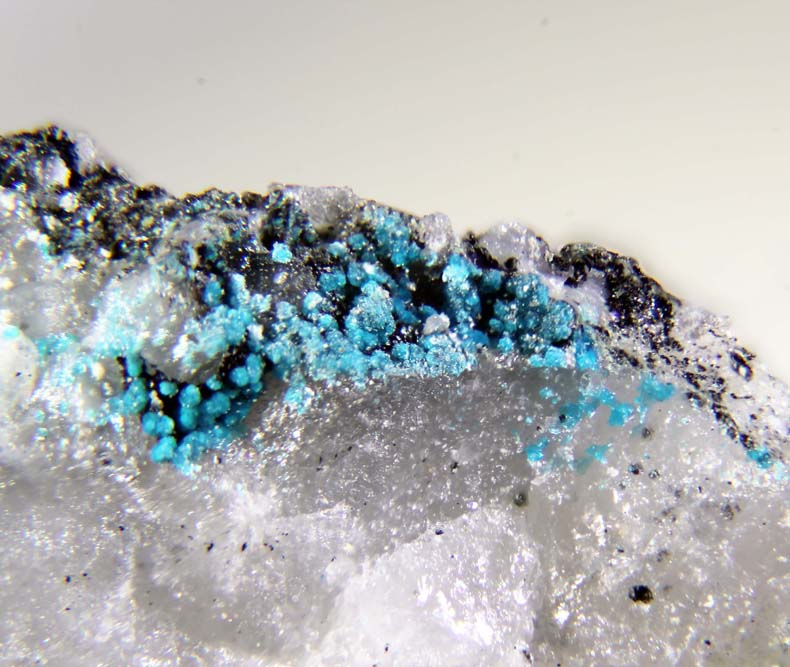
Mahnertite is a mineral found in Provence-Alpes-Côte d’Azur, France

Mahnertite is a rare mineral from Provence-Alpes-Côte d'Azur in France.

The following species are named after Volker Mahnert:

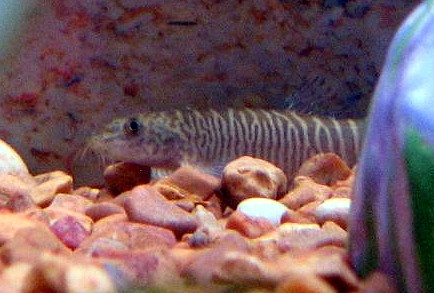
The loach species Schistura mahnerti was named in 1990 by Maurice Kottelat in honor of Volker Mahnert

- Acanthocreagris mahnerti Dumitresco & Orghidan, 1986
- Acritus mahnerti Gomy, 1981
- Akyttara mahnerti Jocqué, 1987
- Allolobophora handlirschi mahnerti Zicsi, 1973 (nun Aporrectodea handlirschi mahnerti)
- Allochernes mahnerti Georgescu & Căpuse, 1996
- Americhernes mahnerti Harvey, 1990
- Apimela mahnerti Pace, 1996
- Aporrectodea mahnerti Zicsi, 1973
- Atheta mahnerti Pace, 1995
- Ausobskya mahnerti Silhavý, 1976
- Bothriechis mahnerti Schätti & Kramer, 1991
- Camillina mahnerti Platnick & Murphy, 1987
- Catharosoma mahnerti Golovatch, 2005
- Centruroides mahnerti Lourenço, 1983
- Chactas mahnerti Lourenço, 1995
- Chthonius (Ephippiochthonius) mahnerti Zaragoza, 1984
- Ctenobelba mahnerti Mahunka, 1974
- Cypha mahnerti Pace, 1994
- Delamarea mahnerti Leleup, 1983
- Dendrobaena mahnerti Zicsi, 1974
- Dolicheremaeus mahnerti Mahunka & Mahunka-Papp, 2009
- Drusilla mahnerti Pace, 1996
- Edaphus mahnerti Puthz, 1990
- Elgonidium mahnerti Bonadona, 1978
- Embuana mahnerti Heiss & Baňař, 2016
- Epipleuria mahnerti Fuersch, 2001
- Glossodrilus mahnerti Zicsi, 1989
- Guaraniella mahnerti Baert, 1984
- Gyrophaena mahnerti Pace, 1994
- Helladocampa mahnerti Condé, 1984
- Hemigrammus mahnerti Uj & Géry, 1989
- Holoparasitus mahnerti Juvara-Bals, 2008
- Leleupiozethus mahnerti Coulon, 1979
- Magellozetes mahnerti Mahunka, 1984
- Mahnertella Mahunka, 1997
- Mahnertius Harvey & Muchmore, 2013
- Mahnertozetes Mahunka & Mahunka-Papp, 2009
- Megarthrus mahnerti Cuccodoro & Löbl, 1995
- Metanapis mahnerti Brignoli, 1981
- Metopioxys mahnerti Comellini, 1983
- Microdipnites mahnerti Garetto & Giachino, 1999
- Microplana mahnerti Minelli, 1977
- Neobisium mahnerti Heurtault, 1980
- Occidenchthonius mahnerti Zaragoza, 2017
- Oedichirus mahnerti de Rougemont, 2018
- Oonops mahnerti Brignoli, 1974
- Origmatrachys mahnerti Kontschán, 2020
- Paracoryza mahnerti Balkenohl, 2000
- Paratemnus mahnerti Sivaraman, 1981
- Paratricommatus mahnerti Soares & Soares, 1985
- Proteocephalus mahnerti de Chambrier & Vaucher, 1999
- Ptychadena mahnerti Perret, 1996
- Roncus mahnerti Ćurčić & Beron, 1981
- Scaphoxium mahnerti Löbl, 2010
- Scheloribates mahnerti Mahunka & Mahunka-Papp, 2008
- Schistura mahnerti Kottelat, 1990
- Scutacarus mahnerti Mahunka, 1972
- Spelaeobochica mahnerti Viana & Ferreira, 2020
- Sprentascaris mahnerti Petter & Cassone, 1984
- Stenohya mahnerti Schawaller, 1994
- Trichouropoda mahnerti Kontschán, 2015
- Zodarion mahnerti Brignoli, 1984
- Zyras mahnerti Pace, 1996

== Source ==
- Biographical information is based on a translation from an equivalent article at the German Wikipedia.
