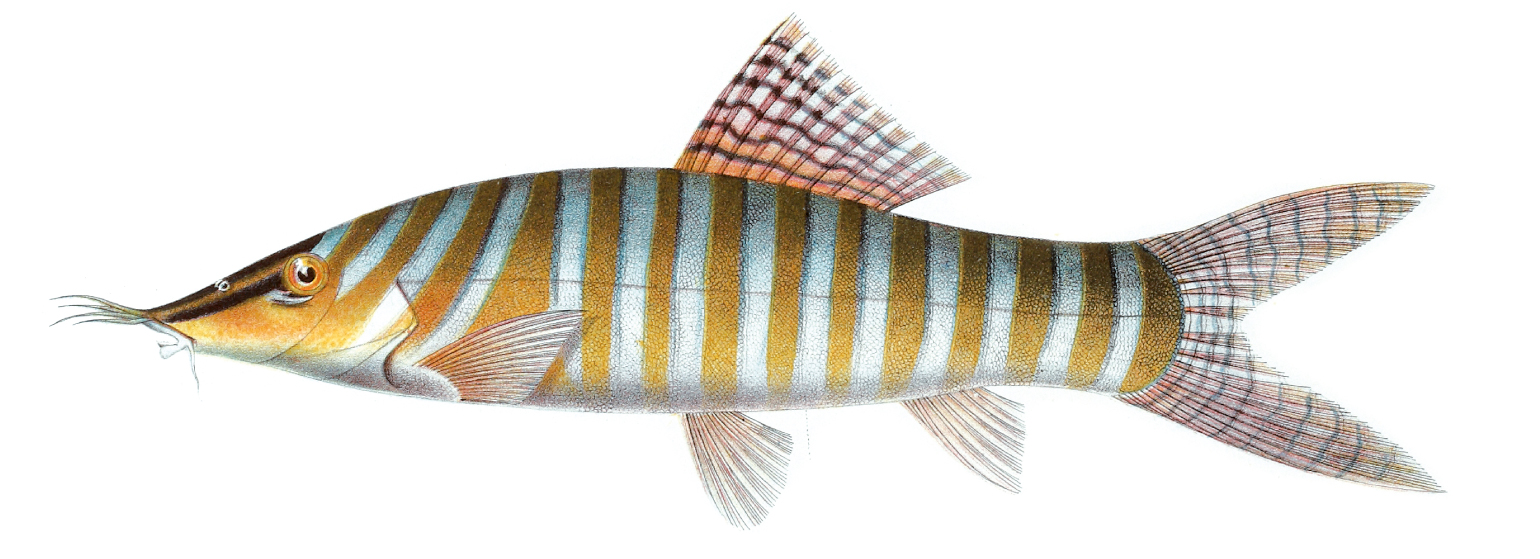
- Syncrossus hymenophysa

Scientific classification
- Domain: Eukaryota
- Kingdom: Animalia
- Phylum: Chordata
- Class: Actinopterygii
- Order: Cypriniformes
- Family: Botiidae
- Genus: Syncrossus; Blyth, 1860

Type species
- Syncrossus berdmorei Blyth, 1860

= Syncrossus =

Genus of fishes

Syncrossus is a genus of six loaches, many of which are popular in the aquarium fish trade. They are primarily found in Southeast Asia, but S. berdmorei also occurs marginally outside this region in far northeastern India. It is one of eight genera in its family.

== Species ==
The currently recognized species in this genus are:

- Syncrossus beauforti (H. M. Smith, 1931) (chameleon loach)
- Syncrossus berdmorei Blyth, 1860 (Blyth's loach)
- Syncrossus helodes (Sauvage, 1876) (lesser Katy Loach)
- Syncrossus hymenophysa (Bleeker, 1852) (green tiger loach)
- Syncrossus lucasbahi (Fowler, 1937)
- Syncrossus reversus (T. R. Roberts, 1989)
