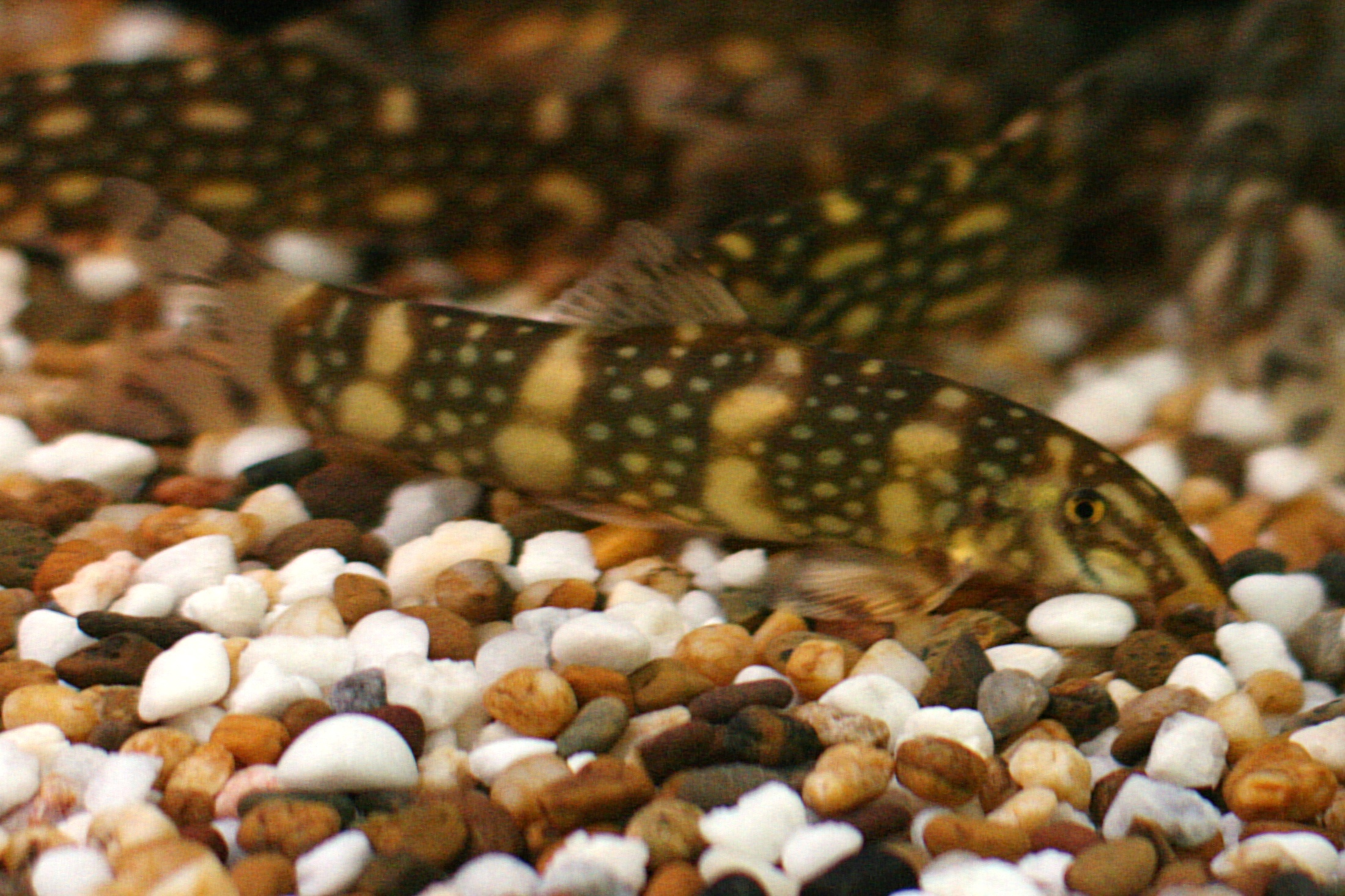

Conservation status
- Data Deficient (IUCN 3.1)

Scientific classification
- Kingdom: Animalia
- Phylum: Chordata
- Class: Actinopterygii
- Order: Cypriniformes
- Family: Botiidae
- Genus: Botia
- Species: B. kubotai

Binomial name
- Botia kubotai Kottelat, 2004

= Burmese border loach =

Species of fish

The Burmese Border loach, angelicus loach or polka dot loach, Botia kubotai, is a recently described species that has quickly become a popular tropical fish for freshwater aquariums. In 2002, fish collectors working in western Thailand began to expand their search into Myanmar (Burma) area from the Three Pagodas Pass Thai-Myanmar border to look for new fish for the aquarium trade. This is one of several species discovered and explains the origin of the fish's common name: Burmese Border Loach. Its specific epithet honors Katsuma Kubota of an aquarium export company in Thailand who first purchased the catch and sent them out for identification.

== Habitat and appearance ==
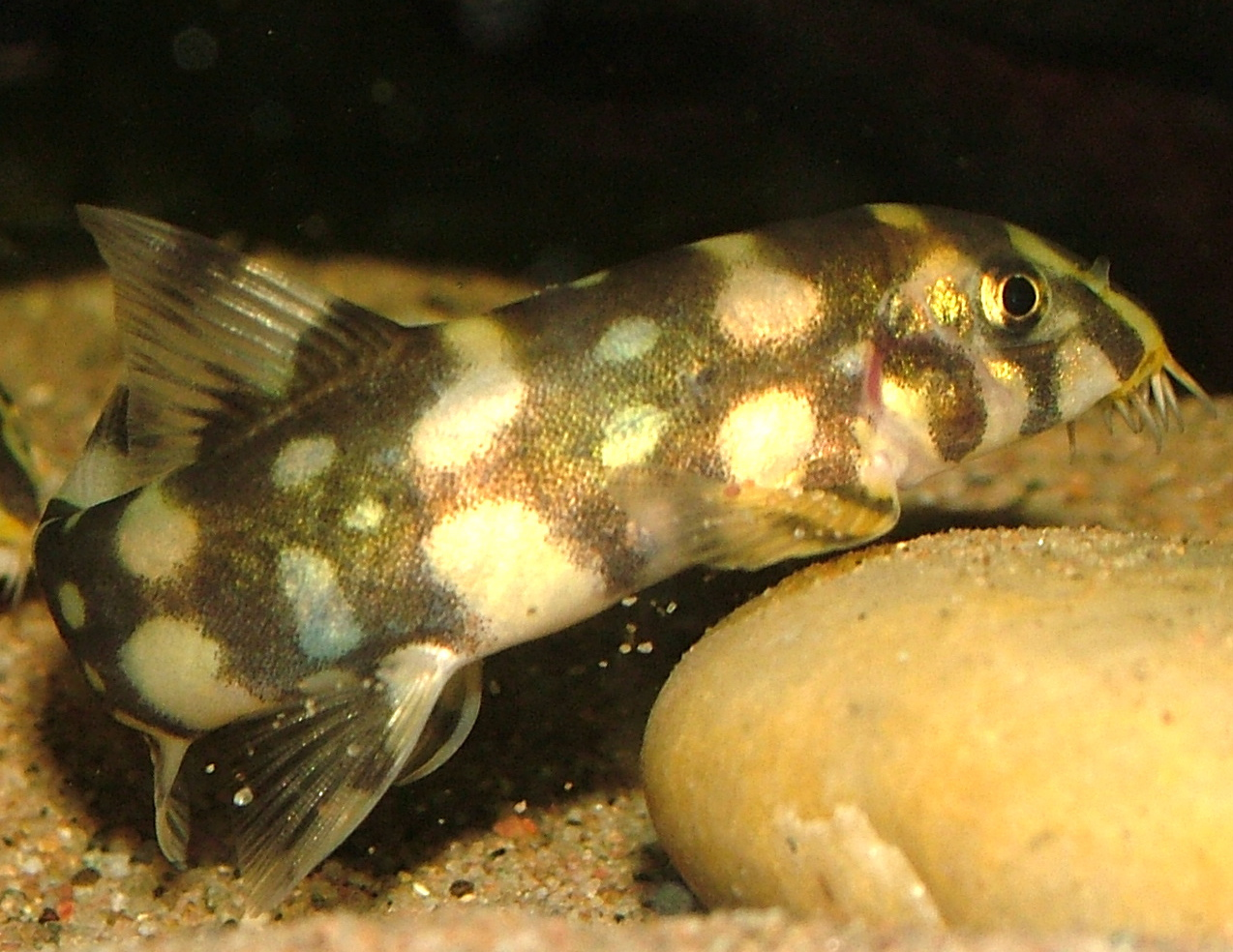
Juvenile Botia kubotai

The fish, a bottom feeder, is found in the Salween River system which is mostly in Myanmar. It was first discovered in Ataran River (known in Thailand as Kasat River), a tributary of Salween River. A population in Thailand was discovered in early 2006 in another tributary of Salween River, Suriya River in Thungyai Naresuan Wildlife Sanctuary. It grows as large as 15 cm in length, but most tend to be smaller at around 10 cm. It has gold, black, and grey colors arranged in a pattern that varies greatly depending on the age of the fish. Juvenile fish at about 2.5 cm are very similar to Botia histrionica. It has yellow body with only black vertical bands. Typically around this size grey dots on the black bands together with a middle horizontal bar joining the bands begin to appear. At about 5 cm, the top and bottom part of the vertical bands start to merge, producing a pattern of big yellow ovals along the body. More grey dots continue to appear as fish grows.

== In aquarium ==
This fish, like most other loach species, should be kept in groups when placed in an aquarium. Suitable water parameters are 25 – 30 °C, pH 6.5 to 6.9, dGH 0 to 8.0. Many hiding places should also be provided. Newly purchased, it is a good idea to treat them for internal parasites, a very common problem for wild-caught bottom feeder fishes.

Botia kubotai is omnivorous and will accept most food types offered to freshwater fish including snails, small shrimp, sinking pellets, blood worms, and black worms.

== See also ==
- List of freshwater aquarium fish species
