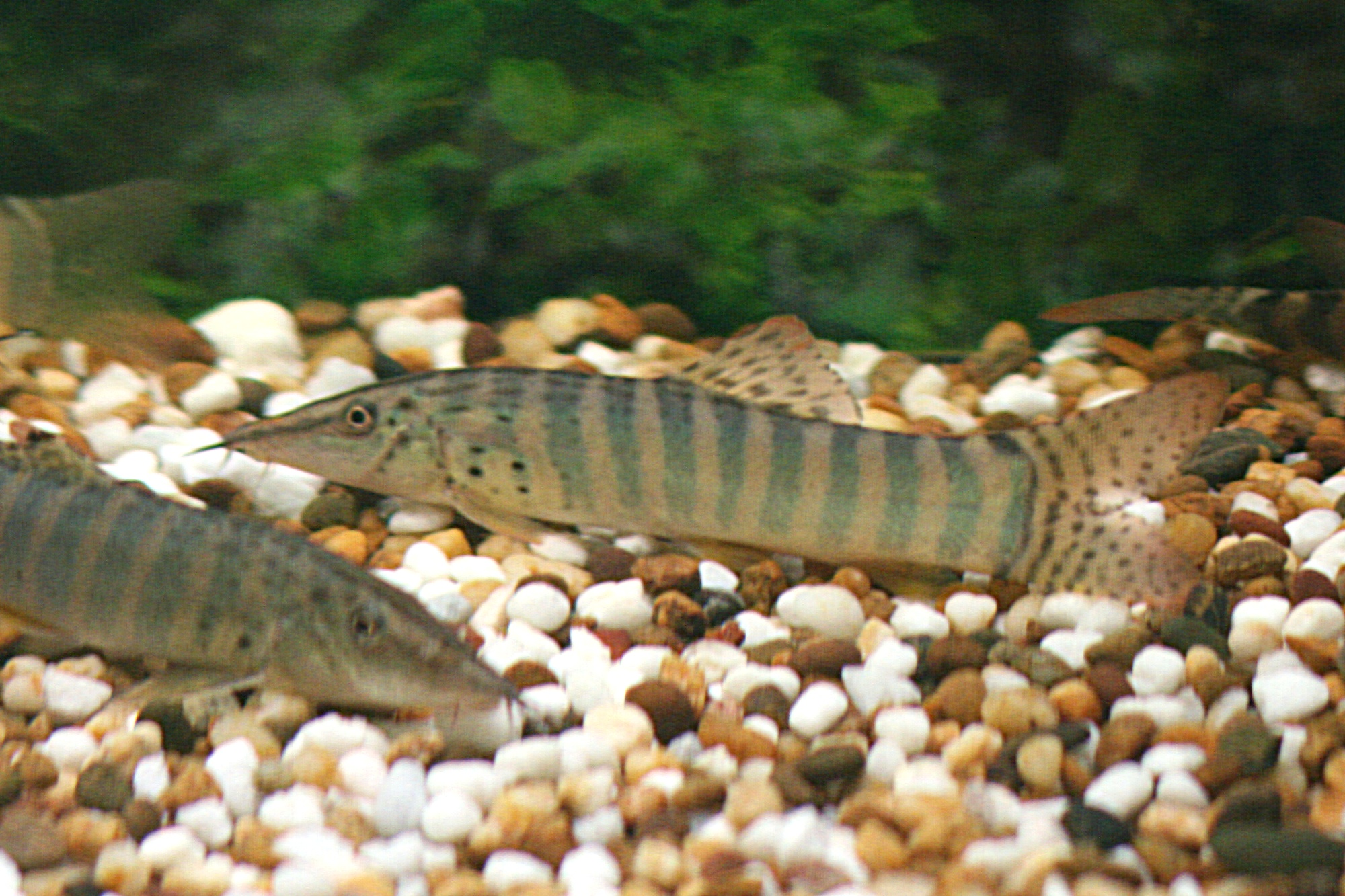

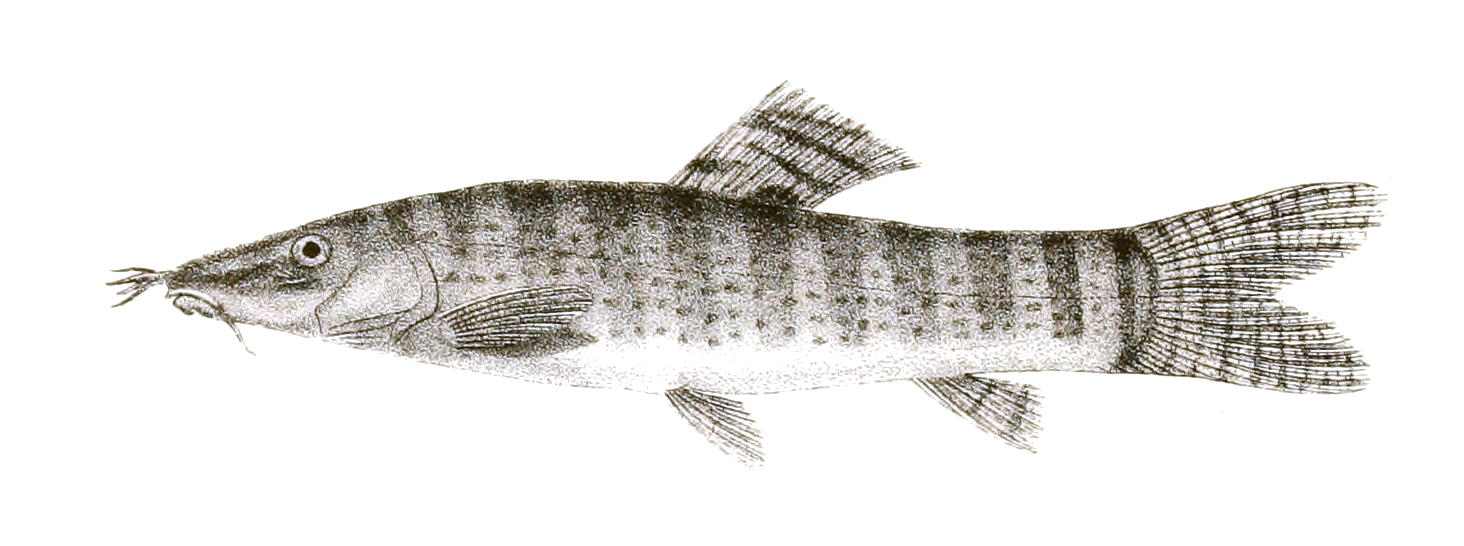

Conservation status
- Near Threatened (IUCN 3.1)

Scientific classification
- Domain: Eukaryota
- Kingdom: Animalia
- Phylum: Chordata
- Class: Actinopterygii
- Order: Cypriniformes
- Family: Botiidae
- Genus: Syncrossus
- Species: S. berdmorei

Binomial name
- Syncrossus berdmorei Blyth, 1860

Synonyms
- Botia berdmorei (Blyth, 1860)

= Syncrossus berdmorei =

Species of fish

Syncrossus berdmorei is a freshwater fish in the loach family Botiidae. It is native to streams and rivers in Thailand, Burma, and nearby parts of northeastern India, where typically found over a soft bottom near boulders and submerged trees. Syncrossus berdmorei grows up to 10 in (25 cm) and can be kept in private aquariums.

Unlike other members of the tiger botia group, Syncrossus berdmorei keeps its striking red fins and body coloration throughout its life. In an aquarium, only one S. berdmorei specimen should be kept per tank, and fed live or frozen foods, unless room is ample for five or more fish. As with other aggressive fish, having a larger group and breaks in sight lines across the tank can disperse aggression throughout the group, but this does not guarantee peaceful interactions.
