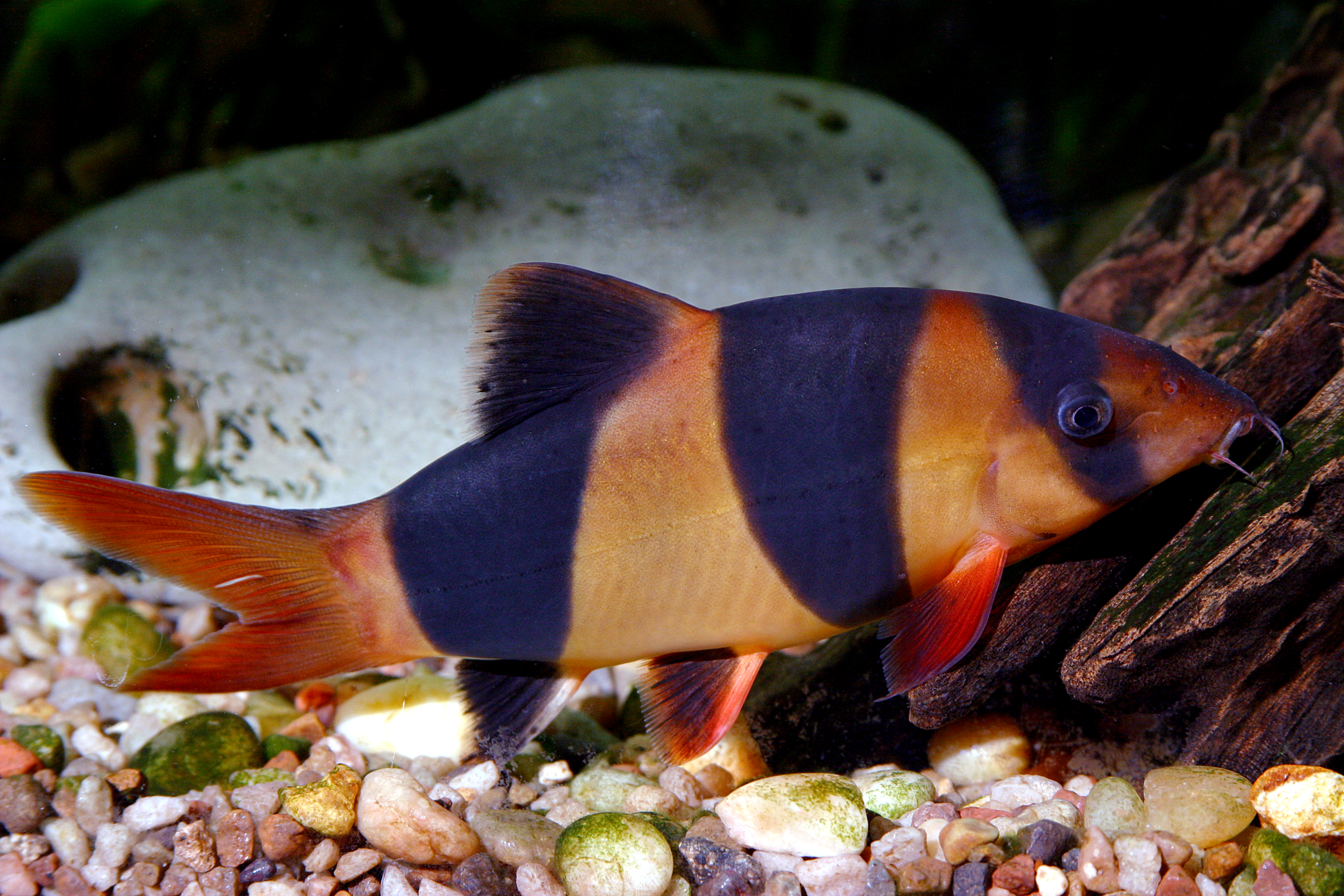

Conservation status
- Least Concern (IUCN 3.1)

Scientific classification
- Kingdom: Animalia
- Phylum: Chordata
- Class: Actinopterygii
- Division: Teleostei
- Order: Cypriniformes
- Family: Botiidae
- Genus: Chromobotia; Kottelat, 2004
- Species: C. macracanthus

Binomial name
- Chromobotia macracanthus (Bleeker, 1852)

Synonyms
- Cobitis macracanthus Bleeker, 1852; Botia macracantha (Bleeker, 1852); Botia macracanthus (Bleeker, 1852)

= Clown loach =

Species of fish

The clown loach (Chromobotia macracanthus), or tiger botia, is a tropical freshwater fish belonging to the botiid loach family. It is the sole member of the genus Chromobotia. It originates in inland waters in Indonesia on the islands of Sumatra and Borneo. The fish is called ulanguli by the locals in Sentarum, West Borneo. It is a popular fish in the freshwater aquarium trade and is sold worldwide.

== Taxonomy and naming ==
The fish was first described as Cobitis macracanthus by Pieter Bleeker in 1852. In 1989, its scientific name was changed to Botia macracanthus. In 2004, Dr. Maurice Kottelat divided the genus Botia, containing 47 different species, into seven separate genera, resulting in the clown loach being placed in a genus of its own, Chromobotia. Its scientific name roughly translates to "Large-thorned colourful warrior".

The common name "clown loach" comes from the fish's bright colours and stripes (often tropical fish with stripes that stand out are commonly called "clown") as well as from its habit of 'entertaining' aquarium owners with strange habits, such as swimming upside down, or 'playing dead.'

== Description and behavior ==
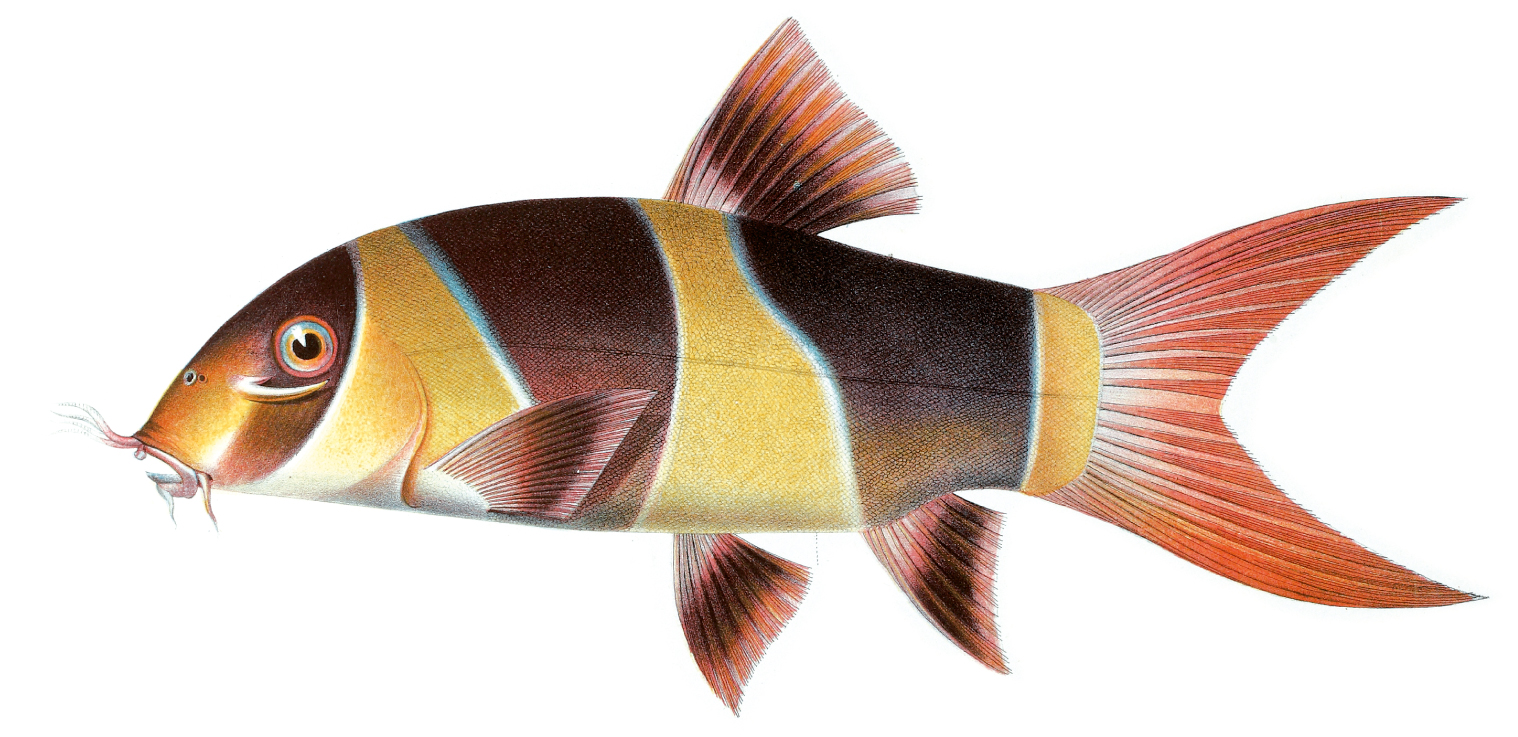
Illustration of a clown loach by Pieter Bleeker, displaying the erected thorn

Information about the maximum size of the clown loach varies, with some estimates ranging up to 20–30 cm (7.9–11.8 in), and with typical adult sizes ranging from 15–20 cm (5.9–7.9 in). The fish's body is long and laterally compressed, with an arched dorsal surface and a flat ventral surface. Its head is relatively large and its mouth faces downward with thick, fleshy lips, and four pairs of barbels. The barbels on the lower jaw are small and difficult to see. Clown loaches can make clicking sounds when they are happy, being territorial (used as a type of weapon/warning) or mating. This sound is produced by the grinding of their pharyngeal teeth.

The body is whitish-orange to reddish-orange, with three thick, black, triangular, vertical bands. The anterior band runs from the top of the head and through the eye, the medial band lies between the head and the dorsal fin, and wraps around to the ventral surface, and the posterior band covers almost all of the caudal peduncle and extends to the anal fin. There is some regional colour variation within the species; the pelvic fins on fish from Borneo are reddish-orange and black, while the pelvic fins on fish from Sumatra are entirely reddish-orange.

The fish is sexually dimorphic, with females being slightly plumper than males. In addition, the tips of the tail on the male curve inwards slightly, whereas the females have straight tips.

The fish has a movable spine that lies in a groove below the eye, which may be extended as a defence mechanism. The spine may cause a painful wound, but is not venomous. It also may be used as a predation tool as it is set close to the mouth.

== Distribution and habitat ==
Clown loaches are native to the islands of Sumatra and Borneo in Indonesia. Clear stream environments provide the optimal habitat for clown loaches, but biannual monsoon flooding forces the fish to move into flooded flood plains, or murky or blackwater rivers or lakes, for 7–8 months of the year, and clown loaches are commonly found in the flood plains of hilly areas. Breeding adults migrate to smaller waterways to spawn annually.

In its native habitat, the fish is found in water with a temperature range of 25 to 30 °C (77 to 86 °F), a pH between 5.0 and 8.0, and water hardness between 5 and 12 dH.

== Reproduction in captivity ==
Clown loach reproduce in captivity only after hormonal stimulation of final oocyte maturation and ovulation. Captive breeding and mass production of clown loach is done primarily in country of origin (Indonesia) and in Europe.

== In the aquarium ==
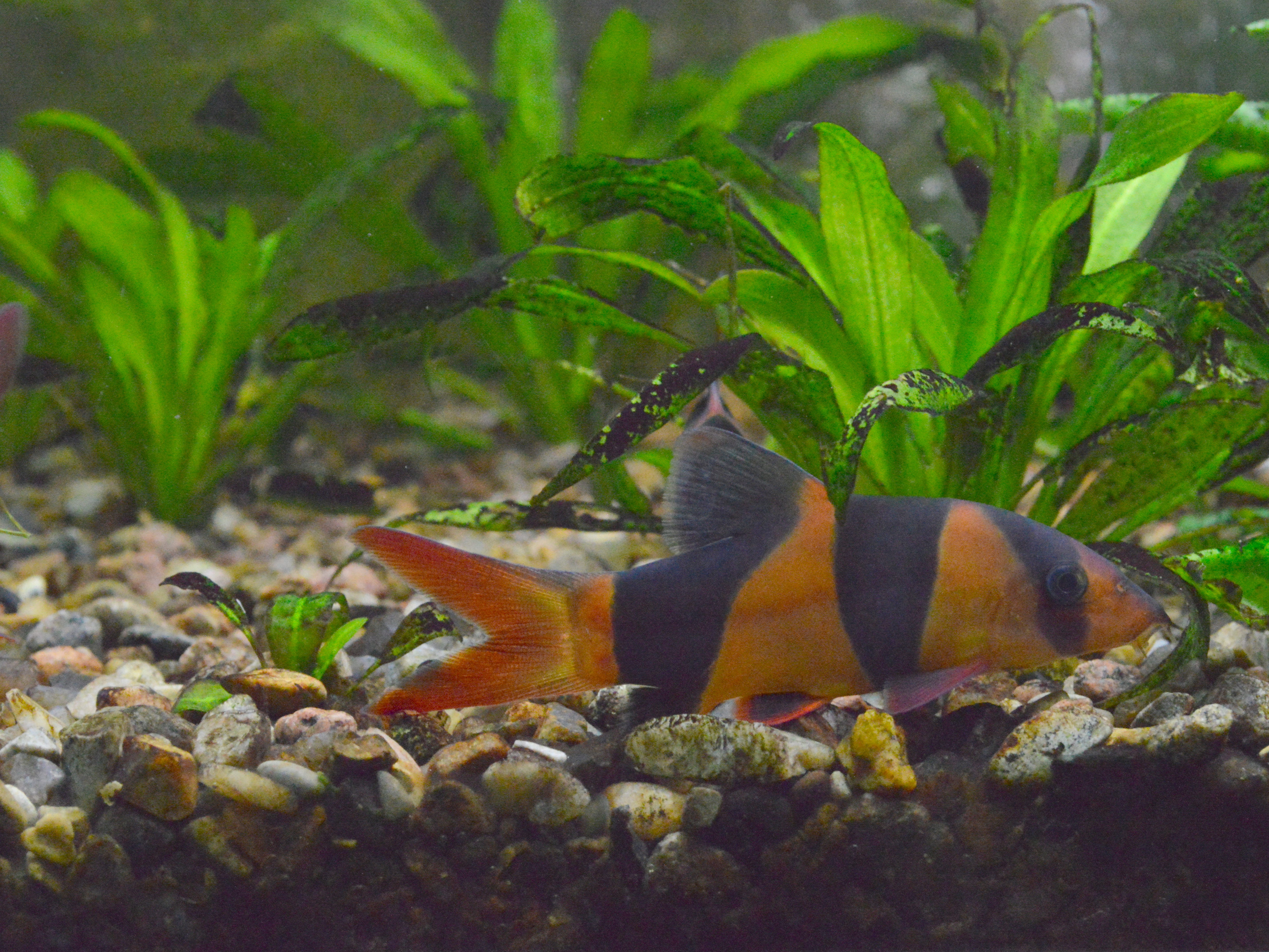
A clown loach in a planted tropical freshwater aquarium.

Recommended conditions in the Aquarium
Tank	450 litres (120 gallons)
Water Temperature	24–28 °C
Temperament	Social, at least groups of 6
Water hardness	4–12°n
pH	6,0–7,2

A common and popular fish for tropical freshwater aquaria, C. macracanthus is a visually pleasing species. Although specimens in the wild will reach 40 to 50 cm, in the aquaria it is uncommon for C. macracanthus to attain more than 15 to 20 cm fork length. They are a very long-lived species, living up to 30 years.

These fish have bifurcated spines under the eyes. They are thought to be used as a defence mechanism and possibly, for obtaining prey.

C. macracanthus will associate with other benthic species in the aquaria if kept singly or with few other specimens. They make suitable tank-mates for any non-aggressive community fishes, but do not thrive when kept with larger, more dominant species.

Occasionally C. macracanthus will exhibit erratic swimming patterns, such as swimming on their sides or upside down. This is not usually a sign of illness, however, and the fish will typically resume normal behaviour almost instantly.

As C. macracanthus is found in riverine environments it is able to cope with good flow rates of water in the aquaria. Aquascapes may replicate this environment to suit the requirements of the species with areas of high flow, but also typically include areas of low flow to allow the fish to rest. C. macracanthus is also fond of cover and is not overly accustomed to bright lighting. The fish will often seek areas of shade or cover in which to rest during the day and become more active when light levels are more subdued. The barbels of clown loaches are known to be easily damaged by rough substrates, such as gravel, in aquaria.

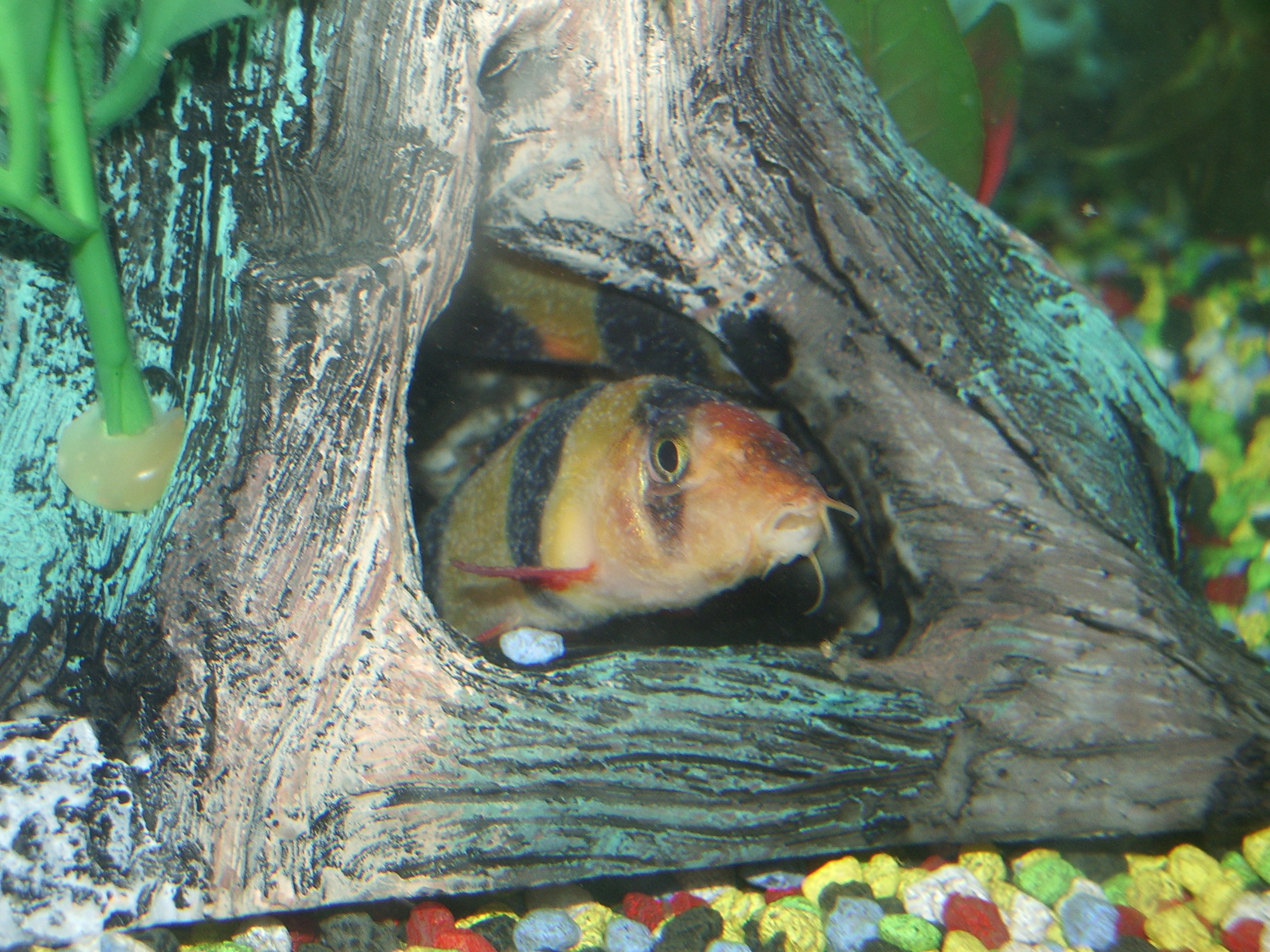
Two juvenile clown loaches with ich. Characteristically, for this stage of infestation, both are hiding in an ornament.

Clown loaches are particularly susceptible to Ichthyophthirius (ich), or white spot disease. Due to the fact that clown loaches have small or no scales, they are often not treated with full doses of medications.

Over-exploitation of C. macracanthus has motivated the development of conservation efforts, mostly new artificial propagation techniques. C. macracanthus is easier to breed when individuals are between two and four centimeters in size.

In the wild, adults feed on worms, crustaceans and plant matter. Most clown loaches accept commercial flake food and sinking pellets as their dietary staple, but thrive with a variety of food: live (worms, brine shrimp, small snails), banana, other plant matter, freeze-dried (tubifex worms, especially if it is fortified) and frozen brine shrimp. Clown loaches (and their cousins) are also one of the few fishes that will eat bladder snails (Physella acuta), and are valued by aquarists for controlling this pest in planted aquaria.

== See also ==
- List of freshwater aquarium fish species
