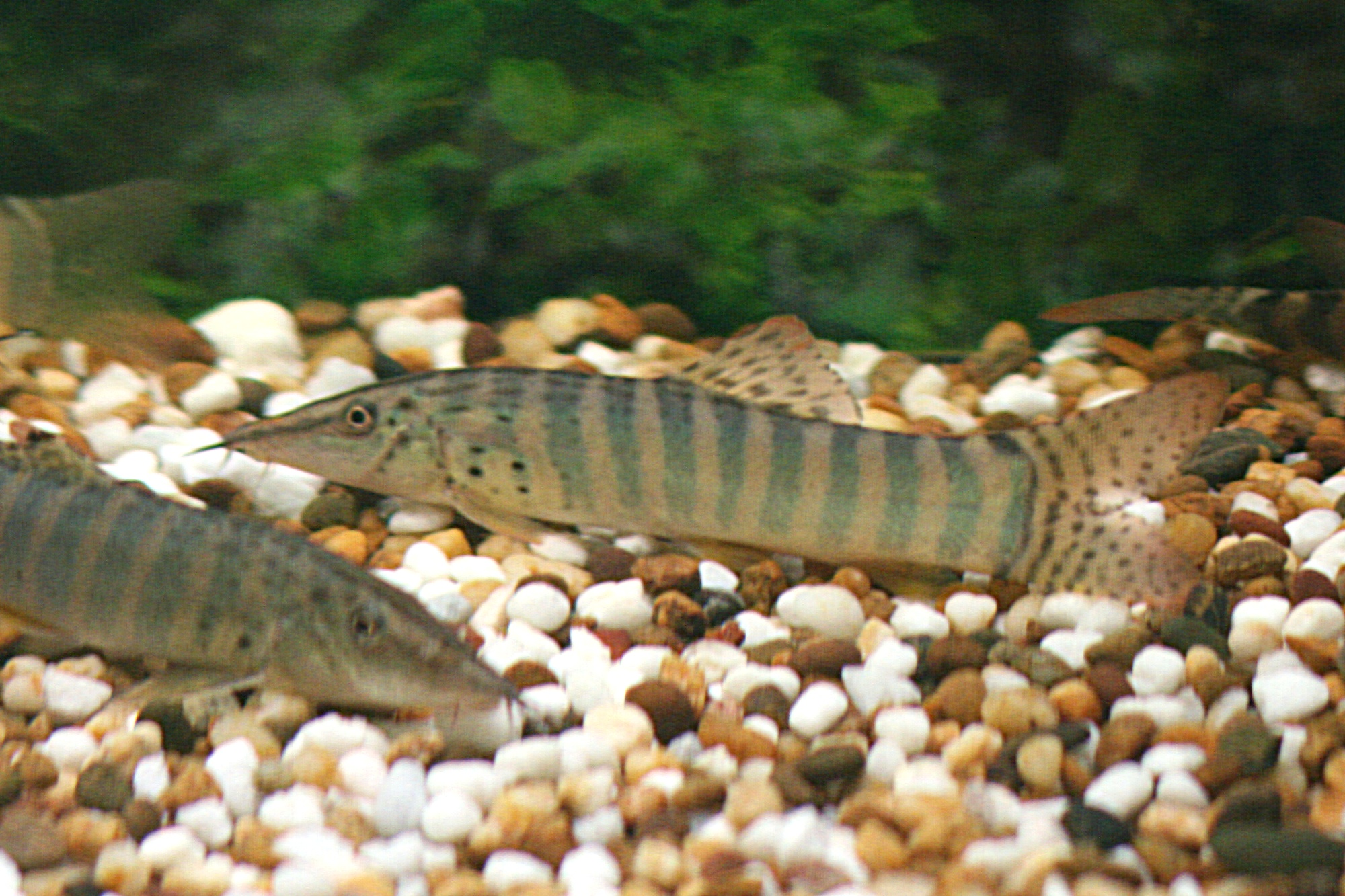
- Tiger loach Syncrossus berdmorei
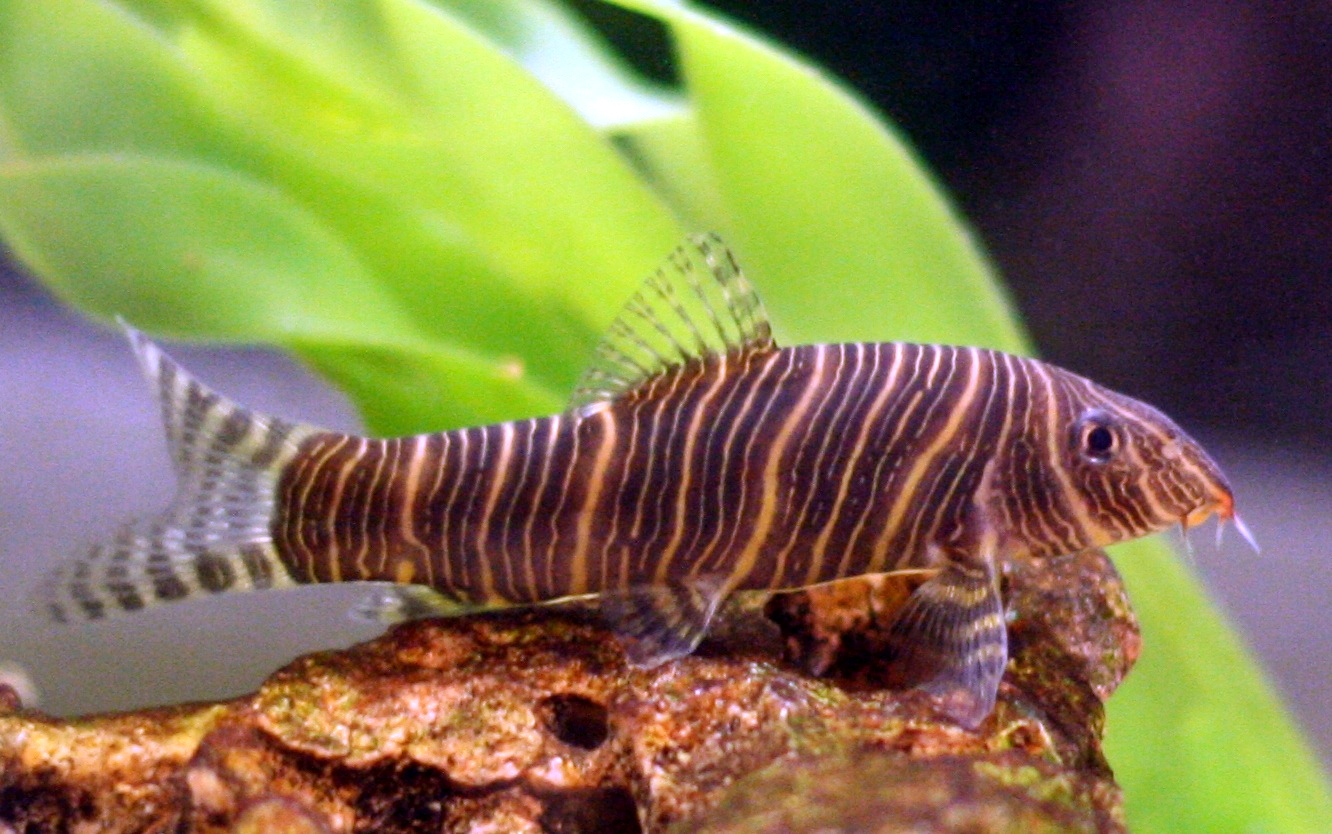
- Zebra loach (Botia striata) with the fusiform shape typical of Botiidae

Scientific classification
- Kingdom: Animalia
- Phylum: Chordata
- Class: Actinopterygii
- Division: Teleostei
- Order: Cypriniformes
- Suborder: Cobitoidei
- Family: Botiidae; L. S. Berg, 1940

Subfamilies
- Botiinae; Leptobotiinae

= Botiidae =

Family of fishes

Botiidae, the pointface loaches, is a family of cypriniform ray-finned fishes from South, Southeast, and East Asia. Until recently they were placed in the true loach family Cobitidae, until Maurice Kottelat revised the loaches and re-elevated this taxon to family rank in 2012. The family includes about 56 species.

The Botiids are more robust than most of their relatives in Cobitidae and tend to have a more or less arched back, yielding an altogether more fusiform shape. Botiids typically have a pointed snout of intermediate length, while many cobitids are remarkably stub-nosed.

Botiids are generally fairly small, with maximum lengths between 6 and 30 cm (2.4 and 11.8 in) depending on the species involved, although Leptobotia elongata reaches 50 cm (20 in) (Chromobotia macracanthus has been claimed to reach a similar size, but this would be exceptional).

== Subfamilies and genera ==
Botiidae contains the following genera, grouped into two subfamilies:

- Subfamily Botiinae
  - Ambastaia Kottelat, 2012
  - Botia Gray, 1831
  - Chromobotia Kottelat, 2004
  - Sinibotia P.-W. Fang, 1936
  - Syncrossus Blyth, 1860
  - Yasuhikotakia Nalbant, 2002
- Subfamily Leptobotiinae
  - Leptobotia Bleeker, 1870
  - Parabotia Guichenot, 1872

== As aquarium fish ==
Many of the more brightly colored species are popular with freshwater aquarists, so are of importance in the aquarium trade. Botiidae often encountered in aquarium trade include:

- Clown loach, Chromobotia macracanthus
- Red-finned loach, Yasuhikotakia modesta
- Dwarf loach, Ambastaia sidthimunki
- Skunk loach, Yasuhikotakia morleti
- Yoyo loach, Botia almorhae
- Zebra loach, B. striata
- Bengal loach, B. dario
- Burmese border loach, B. kubotai
