= Farlowella platorynchus =

Conservation status
- Least Concern (IUCN 3.1)

Scientific classification
- Kingdom: Animalia
- Phylum: Chordata
- Class: Actinopterygii
- Order: Siluriformes
- Suborder: Loricarioidei
- Family: Loricariidae
- Subfamily: Loricariinae
- Genus: Farlowella
- Species: F. platorynchus

Binomial name
- Farlowella platorynchus Retzer & Page, 1997

Synonyms
- Farlowella amazonum

Species of fish

Farlowella platorynchus is a species of armored catfish that occurs in the Upper and lower Amazon basin of Brazil and Peru. This species grows to a length of 19.4 centimetres (7.6 in) SL.
