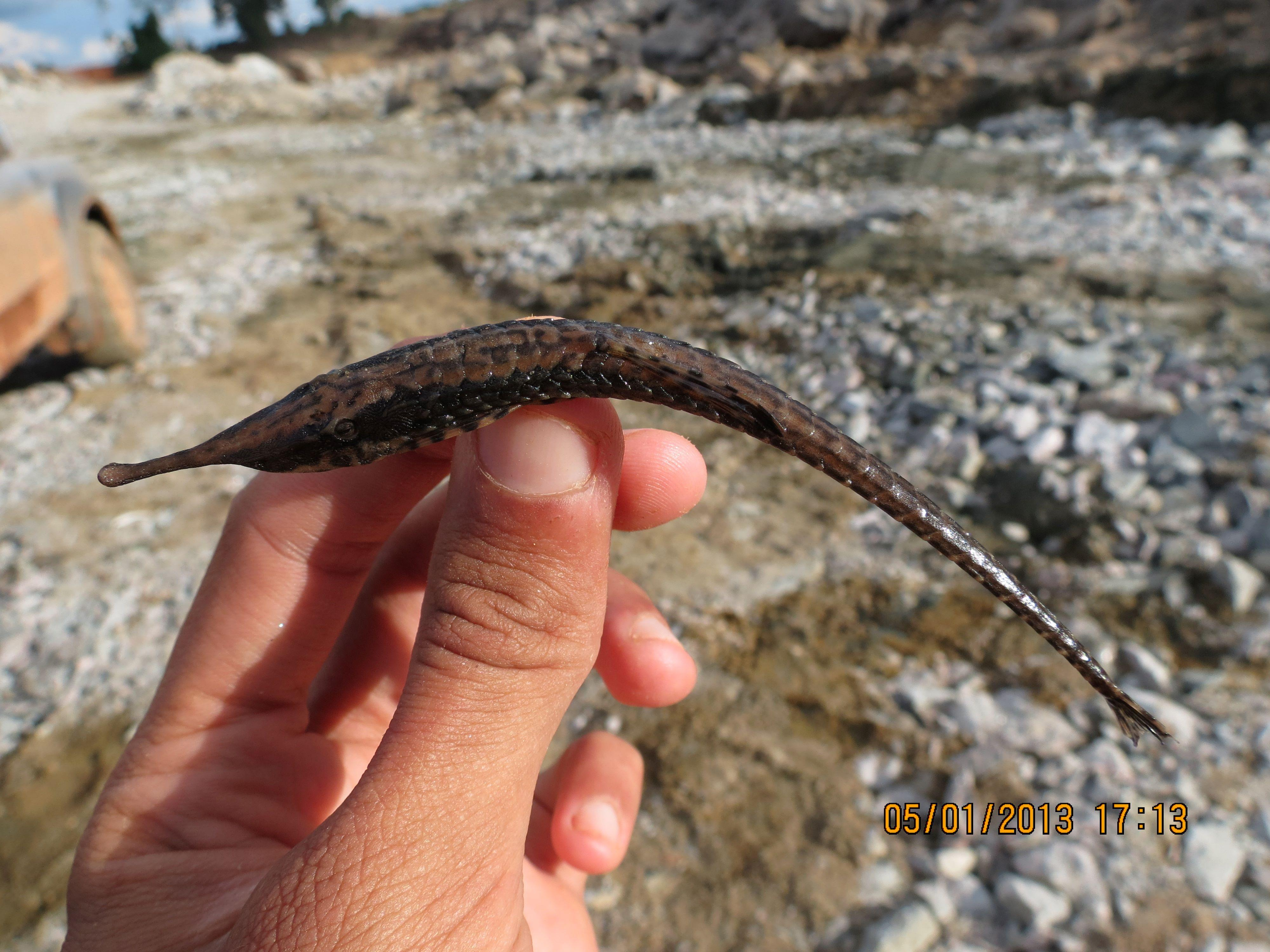

Conservation status
- Least Concern (IUCN 3.1)

Scientific classification
- Kingdom: Animalia
- Phylum: Chordata
- Class: Actinopterygii
- Order: Siluriformes
- Family: Loricariidae
- Genus: Farlowella
- Species: F. amazonum

Binomial name
- Farlowella amazonum (Günther, 1864)

Synonyms
- Acestra amazonum Günther, 1864; Farlowella pseudogladiolus Steindachner, 1910; Farlowella paranaense Meinken, 1937; Farlowella oliveirae A. Miranda-Ribeiro, 1939; Farlowella pleurotaenia A. Miranda Ribeiro 1939; Farlowella platorynchus Retzer & Page, 1997

= Farlowella amazonum =

Species of fish

Farlowella amazonum is a species of freshwater ray-finned fish belonging to the family Loricariidae, the suckermouth armored catfishes, and the subfamily Loricariinae, the mailed catfishes. This catfish is found in Bolivia, Brazil, Colombia, Guyana, Peru and Venezuela where it is found in the drainage basins of the Amazon, Orinoco, Essequibo, Tocantins, and Paraguay rivers. This species grows to a standard length of 22.5 cm (8.9 in).
