= Farlowella colombiensis =

Scientific classification
- Kingdom: Animalia
- Phylum: Chordata
- Class: Actinopterygii
- Order: Siluriformes
- Family: Loricariidae
- Genus: Farlowella
- Species: F. colombiensis

Binomial name
- Farlowella colombiensis Retzer & Page, 1997

Species of fish

Farlowella colombiensis is a species of armored catfish endemic to Colombia where it is found in the Meta River basin. This species grows to a length of 16.0 centimetres (6.3 in) SL.
