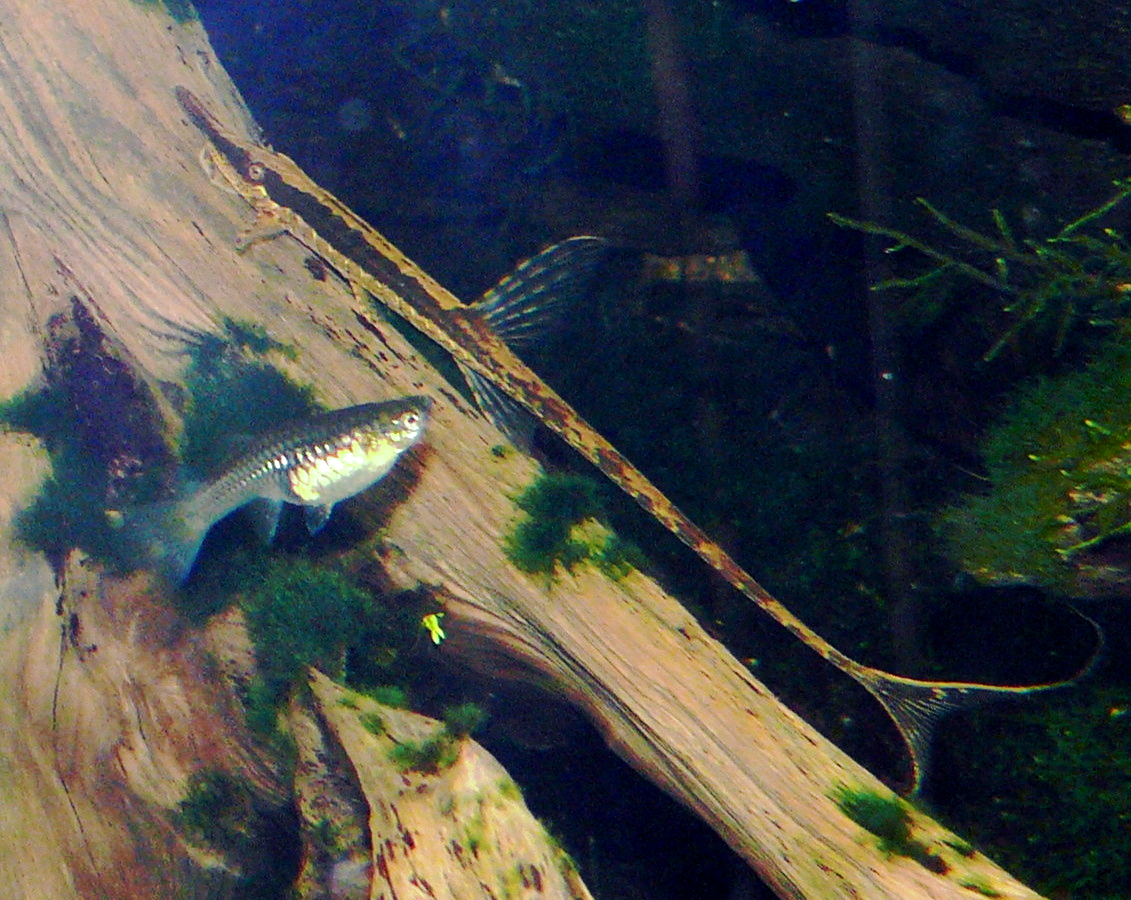

Conservation status
- Vulnerable (IUCN 3.1)

Scientific classification
- Kingdom: Animalia
- Phylum: Chordata
- Class: Actinopterygii
- Order: Siluriformes
- Family: Loricariidae
- Genus: Farlowella
- Species: F. acus

Binomial name
- Farlowella acus (Kner, 1853)

Synonyms
- Acestra acus Kner, 1853; Loricaria scolopacina De Filippi, 1853; Farlowella scolopacina (De Filippi, 1853); Farlowella colombiensis Retzer & Page, 1997

= Farlowella acus =

Species of fish

Farlowella acus, the whiptail catfish or twig catfish, is a species of freshwater ray-finned fish belonging to the family Loricariidae, the suckermouth armored catfishes, and the subfamily Loricariinae, the mailed catfishes. This catfish is found in South America. It is the type species of the genus Farlowella. The whiptail catfish is kept in the aquarium hobby.

== Taxonomy ==
Farlowella acus was first formally described as Acestra acus in 1853 by the Austrian ichthyologist Rudolf Kner with Caracas given as the type locality. When Kner described A. acus he proposed the new genus Acestra and in 1864 Pieter Bleeker designated this species as the type species of that genus. The name Acestra was, however, preoccuppied by a genus of Hemiptera, Acestra, named by William Dallas in 1852, and a genus of pipefishes named by Charles Lucien Bonaparte in 1852, now a synonym of Nerophis. Carl H. Eigenmann and Rosa Smith Eigenmann proposed the name Farlowella as a replacement for Acestra, in respect of the catfishes in 1889. The genus Farlowella is placed in the tribe Hartiini by some authorities. This genus is classified in the subfamily Loricariinae of the family Loricariidae and the suborder Loricarioidei within the catfish order, Siluriformes.

== Etymology ==
Fralowella acus is the type species of the genus Farlowella, this name suffixes the diminutive "ella" onto the surname Farlow, honouring the American botanist William Gilson Farlow of Harvard University, who specialised in phycology. The specific name, acus, means needle, an allusion to the elongated, thin form of this catfish.

== Distribution ==
Farlowella acus found in South America where it shows a disjunct distribution in Colombia and Venezuela. The Colombian populations lives in the upper basin of the Meta River and probably the Guaviare River; the Venezuelan population is found in the Lake Valencia basin and in the Torito River, a tributary of the Orinoco.

== Appearance and anatomy ==
Farlowella acus reaches a standard length of 16.0 cm (6.3 in). The coloration of the species ranges from olive-green to yellow-brown with yellowish undersides. A very distinct irregular dark band, often beset with blotches, extends from the head to the root of the tail. The fins are transparent and the rays have dark spots. Each caudal lobe is normally with a dark band. Males' snout or rostrum is broader than the females'. When mature, the male's rostrum becomes adorned with small bristles known as odontodes. The females' thinner snouts will remain smooth at all times.

== Ecology ==
Farlowella acus feed on plants and roots. Twig catfishes spawn from between November and March.

== Conservation ==
Farlowella acus is classified as Vulnerable by the International Union for Conservation of Nature with both disjunct populations threatened by habitat degradation caused by the increase in human settlement and activities in the drainage systems it occurs in. The situation in the Lake Valncia basin is particularly serious.

== In the aquarium ==
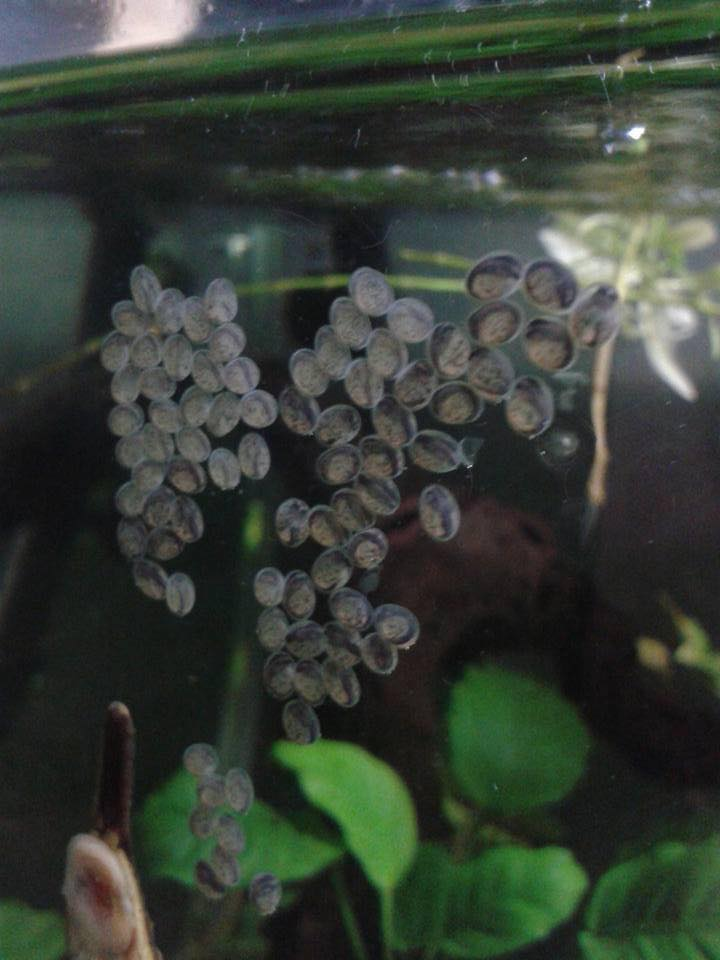
Reproduction of Farlowella acus in an aquarium setting. Eggs are often deposited on aquarium walls.

F. acus is one of the most commonly exported species of Farlowella for the aquarium. Twig catfishes are peaceful and sociable bottom dwellers and can be kept in most freshwater community tanks without problems, either as a single pet or as a group. It thrives best in a tank of at least 24 inches (60 cm) or 35 gallons, and should be provided with plenty of shelter such as bogwood pieces, vine roots, vertical twigs or slender plant stems to allow natural behavior. However, twig catfishes do not handle sudden or large amounts of water changes very well. They easily succumb to the shock of such an action. Therefore, a few small water changes per week with aged water are recommended in order to avoid stress. The water pH should be neutral with the temperature maintained between 72–77 °F. This fragile fish should be kept in a well-filtered aquarium with other quiet tankmates such as small characins (tetras), rasboras, or Corydoras catfish. Aggressive fish such as barbs, cichlids, and larger catfishes should be avoided.

=== Feeding ===
These fish will primarily feed on algae and vegetable laden wafers or tablets; though they might accept worms or such meatier fare, they do not do well on this type of diet. It is quite difficult to get a right balance in feeding these species because of their herbivorous preference.

=== Breeding ===
Twig catfish can be induced to breed at any time, if in good condition, in captivity. In the aquarium the male will clean a hard surface (usually the aquarium wall) and the female lays its eggs at night or early morning. The female normally lays a clutch of about 60 to 80 eggs on this surface. During the incubation period the male tends to the eggs with its mouth and by fanning them with his pectoral fins. The eggs will hatch after 6 to 10 days, depending on the temperature. Newly hatched larvae will quickly feed on any organic or plant material and micro bacteria found in an established tank but can also be provided with cucumber, squashed peas, lettuce and courgette (zucchini) as daily supplements.
