= Farlowella taphorni =

Scientific classification
- Kingdom: Animalia
- Phylum: Chordata
- Class: Actinopterygii
- Order: Siluriformes
- Family: Loricariidae
- Genus: Farlowella
- Species: F. taphorni

Binomial name
- Farlowella taphorni Retzer & Page, 1997

Species of fish

Farlowella taphorni is a species of freshwater ray-finned fish belonging to the family Loricariidae, the suckermouth armored catfishes, and the subfamily Loricariinae, the mailed catfishes. This catfish is endemic to Venezuela where it is found in the Torondoy River basin in the Lake Maracaibo drainage. This species reaches a standard length of 16.2 cm (6.4 in).

The specific name honors the American ichthyologist Donald C. Taphorn in recognition of his contribution to Neotropical ichthyology and his assistance to the species authors, Michael Eugene Retzer and Lawrence M. Page.
