= Farlowella hahni =

Conservation status
- Least Concern (IUCN 3.1)

Scientific classification
- Kingdom: Animalia
- Phylum: Chordata
- Class: Actinopterygii
- Order: Siluriformes
- Family: Loricariidae
- Genus: Farlowella
- Species: F. hahni

Binomial name
- Farlowella hahni Meinken, 1937

Species of fish

Farlowella hahni is a species of freshwater ray-finned fish belonging to the family Loricariidae, the suckermouth armored catfishes, and the subfamily Loricariinae, the mailed catfishes. This catfish is found in Argentina, Brazil and Paraguay where it occurs in the middle Paraná River basin. This species reaches a standard length of 20.1 cm (7.9 in). The specific name honours Carlos Hahn, a friend of Hermann Meinken's and "fish connoisseur", of Corrientes who corresponded with Meinken about fishes and who provided the holotype of this species from his collection.
