= Farlowella paraguayensis =

Conservation status
- Least Concern (IUCN 3.1)

Scientific classification
- Kingdom: Animalia
- Phylum: Chordata
- Class: Actinopterygii
- Order: Siluriformes
- Family: Loricariidae
- Genus: Farlowella
- Species: F. paraguayensis

Binomial name
- Farlowella paraguayensis Retzer & Page, 1997

Species of armored catfish

Farlowella paraguayensis is a species of freshwater ray-finned fish belonging to the family Loricariidae, the suckermouth armored catfishes, and the subfamily Loricariinae, the mailed catfishes. This catfishis found in the Paraguay River basin in Brazil and Paraguay. This species grows to a maximum standard length of 17.5 cm (6.9 in).

This small catfish has a long snout and a narrow, long body that resembles a twig, hence the common name of stick catfish or twig catfish.

It is available for sale as an aquarium fish and is said to be a peaceful fish that eats vegetable matter. It needs clean well oxygenated water and a sand and gravel bed. It requires warm water between 22 and 27 °C (72 and 81 °F).

This species of cat fish had been seen 4 times on camera since 2019-11-14
