= Farlowella odontotumulus =

Conservation status
- Data Deficient (IUCN 3.1)

Scientific classification
- Kingdom: Animalia
- Phylum: Chordata
- Class: Actinopterygii
- Order: Siluriformes
- Family: Loricariidae
- Genus: Farlowella
- Species: F. odontotumulus

Binomial name
- Farlowella odontotumulus Retzer & Page, 1997

Species of fish

Farlowella odontotumulus is a species of freshwater ray-finned fish belonging to the family Loricariidae, the suckermouth armored catfishes, and the subfamily Loricariinae, the mailed catfishes. This catfish has been reported from Brazil, Ecuador and Venezuela. In Ecuador it is found in the Aguarico River basin, the type locality, and the ony locality it has definitely been recorded from. In Venezuela it has been reported from the Mavaca River basin and, in Brazil, it has been reported from the Rio Bugre in Mato Grosso. The records from Brazil and Venezuela require confirmation. This species grows to a maximum standard length of 17.5 cm (6.9 in).
