= Paracanthocobitis abutwebi =

Hillstream zipper loach

Scientific classification
- Domain: Eukaryota
- Kingdom: Animalia
- Phylum: Chordata
- Class: Actinopterygii
- Order: Cypriniformes
- Family: Nemacheilidae
- Genus: Paracanthocobitis
- Species: P. abutwebi

Binomial name
- Paracanthocobitis abutwebi R. A. Singer & Page, 2015

Species of fish

Paracanthocobitis abutwebi also known as the hillstream zipper loach is a species of ray-finned fish in the genus Paracanthocobitis. This species is known from the Karnaphuli, Meghna, and lower Brahmaputra and Ganges river drainages of Bangladesh.
