= Paracanthocobitis adelaideae =

Checkerboard zipper loach

Scientific classification
- Domain: Eukaryota
- Kingdom: Animalia
- Phylum: Chordata
- Class: Actinopterygii
- Order: Cypriniformes
- Family: Nemacheilidae
- Genus: Paracanthocobitis
- Species: P. adelaideae

Binomial name
- Paracanthocobitis adelaideae R. A. Singer & Page, 2015

Species of fish

Paracanthocobitis adelaideae also known as the checkerboard zipper loach is a species of ray-finned fish in the genus Paracanthocobitis. This species is known from the Irrawaddy basin of northern Myanmar.
