= Acanthocobitis longipinnis =

Scientific classification
- Kingdom: Animalia
- Phylum: Chordata
- Class: Actinopterygii
- Order: Cypriniformes
- Family: Nemacheilidae
- Genus: Acanthocobitis
- Species: A. longipinnis

Binomial name
- Acanthocobitis longipinnis Peters, 1861

Species of fish

Acanthocobitis longipinnis is a species of freshwater ray-finned fish belonging to the family Nemacheilidae, the stone loaches. This species is known from a single specimen, the holotype, which was collected from the Ganges. This species was first formally described in 1861 by the German naturalist and explorer Wilhelm Peters and Peters proposed the new genus Acanthocobitis. Later authors treated this species as a synonym of Cobitis pavonacea but in 2021 Maurice Kottelat and Waikhom Vishwanath published a paper that argued that A. longipennis was a valid species and that it was one of two species of loach in the genus Acanthocobitis, alongside A. pavonacea, with the other species being classified in the genus Paracanthocobitis. This species is the type species of the genus Acanthocobitis.
