= Farlowella isbruckeri =

Conservation status
- Data Deficient (IUCN 3.1)

Scientific classification
- Kingdom: Animalia
- Phylum: Chordata
- Class: Actinopterygii
- Order: Siluriformes
- Family: Loricariidae
- Genus: Farlowella
- Species: F. isbruckeri

Binomial name
- Farlowella isbruckeri Retzer & Page, 1997

Species of fish

Farlowella isbruckeri is a species of freshwater ray-finned fish belonging to the family Loricariidae, the suckermouth armored catfishes, and the subfamily Loricariinae, the mailed catfishes. This catfish is endemic to Brazil where it is found in the upper basin of the Paraguay River in the state of Mato Grosso and Mato Grosso do Sul. This species reaches a standard length of 17 cm (6.7 in).

The specific name honors the Dutch ichthyologist Isaäc J. H. Isbrücker, in recognition of his important contribution to the taxonomy of the mailed catfishes.
