= Paracanthocobitis mackenziei =

Robust zipper loach

Conservation status
- Least Concern (IUCN 3.1)

Scientific classification
- Kingdom: Animalia
- Phylum: Chordata
- Class: Actinopterygii
- Order: Cypriniformes
- Family: Nemacheilidae
- Genus: Paracanthocobitis
- Species: P. mackenziei

Binomial name
- Paracanthocobitis mackenziei (B. L. Chaudhuri, 1910)

Synonyms
- Nemachilus mackenziei Chaudhuri, 1910

Species of fish

Paracanthocobitis mackenziei also known as the robust zipper loach is a species of ray-finned fish in the genus Paracanthocobitis. This species is the most widely distributed species of Paracanthocobitis and is known from the Ganges River basin of Nepal and India, the Meghna River basin in Bangladesh, the Mahanadi River basin in eastern India, and the upper Indus River basin of northern India and eastern Pakistan. Fishbase treats P. (A). mackenziei under Nemachilus mackenziei as a synonym of Acnthocobitis botia.
