= Farlowella yarigui =

Conservation status
- Data Deficient (IUCN 3.1)

Scientific classification
- Kingdom: Animalia
- Phylum: Chordata
- Class: Actinopterygii
- Order: Siluriformes
- Family: Loricariidae
- Genus: Farlowella
- Species: F. yarigui

Binomial name
- Farlowella yarigui Ballen & Mojica, 2014

Species of catfish

Farlowella yarigui is a species of freshwater ray-finned fish belonging to the family Loricariidae, the suckermouth armored catfishes, and the subfamily Loricariinae, the mailed catfishes. It is native to South America, where it occurs in the Topón River, which is part of the middle Magdalena River basin in Colombia. It is only found in the vicinity of partially submerged vegetation and pieces of wood, with the species being absent in other microhabitats within the main channel of the Topón. It is known to occur alongside the species Astyanax caucanus, Astyanax filiferus, Ctenobrycon magdalenae, Lasiancistrus caucanus, and Roeboides dayi, as well as members of the genera Chaetostoma, Creagrutus, Hemibrycon, and Sturisoma. The species reaches 11.2 cm (4.4 in) in standard length and is believed to be a facultative air-breather.
