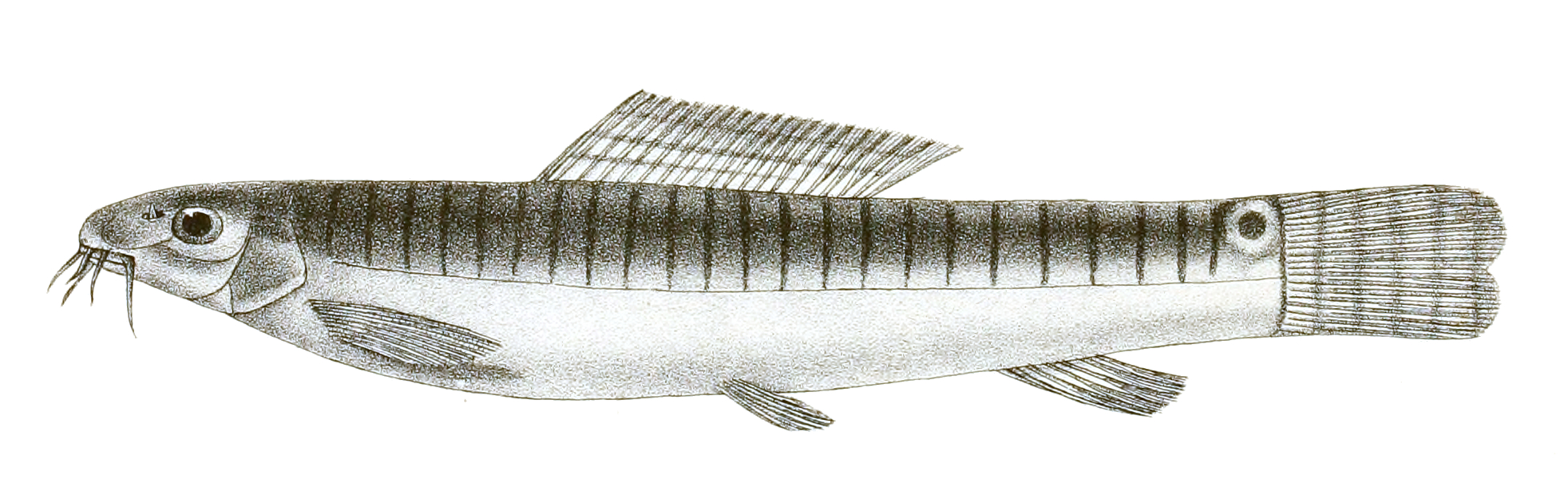

Conservation status
- Vulnerable (IUCN 3.1)

Scientific classification
- Kingdom: Animalia
- Phylum: Chordata
- Class: Actinopterygii
- Division: Teleostei
- Order: Cypriniformes
- Family: Nemacheilidae
- Genus: Acanthocobitis
- Species: A. pavonacea

Binomial name
- Acanthocobitis pavonacea (McClelland, 1839)

Synonyms
- Cobitis pavonacea McClelland, 1839; Nemacheilus pavonaceus (McClelland, 1839); Noemacheilus pavonaceus (McClelland, 1839); Schistura pavonaceus (McClelland, 1839)

= Acanthocobitis pavonacea =

Species of fish

Acanthocobitis pavonacea, also known as the spearfin loach, is a species of ray-finned fish belonging to the family Nemacheilidae, the stone loaches. This species is found in the Brahmaputra River of Assam. This is one of two species in the genus Acanthocobitis, alongside the type species, A. longipinnis. A. longipennis was treated as synonym of this species but in 2021 Maurice Kottelat and Waikhom Vishwanath published a paper that argued that A. longipennis was a valid species and that it was one of two species of loach in the genus Acanthocobitis, alongside A. pavonacea, with the other species being classified in the genus Paracanthocobitis. This species is the type species of the genus Acanthocobitis.
