= Paracanthocobitis maekhlongensis =

Maekhlong zipper loach

Scientific classification
- Domain: Eukaryota
- Kingdom: Animalia
- Phylum: Chordata
- Class: Actinopterygii
- Order: Cypriniformes
- Family: Nemacheilidae
- Genus: Paracanthocobitis
- Species: P. maekhlongensis

Binomial name
- Paracanthocobitis maekhlongensis R. A. Singer & Page, 2015

Species of fish

Paracanthocobitis maekhlongensis also known as the Maekhlong zipper loach is a species of ray-finned fish in the genus Paracanthocobitis. This species is known from the Maeklong River basin, Kanchanaburi Province, Thailand.

This fish is distinguished from others of its type due to its suborbital groove, pelvic fin, large dorsal fin, irregular light and dark spots, and thin dorsal saddles. It is found in a freshwater environment, demersal zone, and tropical range.
