= Paracanthocobitis linypha =

Sewing needle zipper loach

Scientific classification
- Domain: Eukaryota
- Kingdom: Animalia
- Phylum: Chordata
- Class: Actinopterygii
- Order: Cypriniformes
- Family: Nemacheilidae
- Genus: Paracanthocobitis
- Species: P. linypha

Binomial name
- Paracanthocobitis linypha R. A. Singer & Page, 2015

Species of fish

Paracanthocobitis linypha also known as the sewing needle zipper loach is a species of ray-finned fish in the genus Paracanthocobitis. This species is known from the Irrawaddy and Sittang basins in Myanmar.
