= Farlowella oxyrryncha =

Conservation status
- Least Concern (IUCN 3.1)

Scientific classification
- Kingdom: Animalia
- Phylum: Chordata
- Class: Actinopterygii
- Order: Siluriformes
- Family: Loricariidae
- Genus: Farlowella
- Species: F. oxyrryncha

Binomial name
- Farlowella oxyrryncha (Kner, 1853)

Synonyms
- Acestra oxyrryncha Kner, 1853; Acestra gladius Boulenger, 1858; Farlowella gladius (Boulenger, 1898)

Species of fish

Farlowella oxyrryncha is a species of freshwater ray-finned fish belonging to the family Loricariidae, the suckermouth armored catfishes, and the subfamily Loricariinae, the mailed catfishes. This catfish has been is found in the Amazon basin, as well as the Tocantins-Araguaia, Orinoco, Essequibo and Gurupi basins in Bolivia, Brazil, Colombia. Ecuador, Guyana, Peru and Venezuela, it may also occur in French Guiana and Suriname. This species grows to a maximum standard length of 23 cm (9.1 in).
