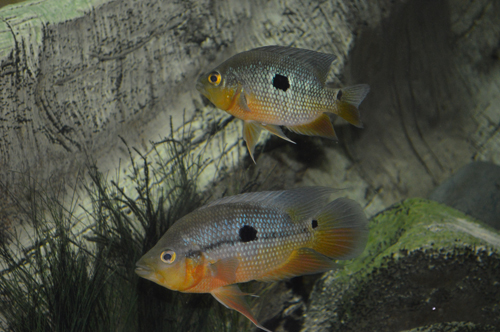

Scientific classification
- Kingdom: Animalia
- Phylum: Chordata
- Class: Actinopterygii
- Order: Cichliformes
- Family: Cichlidae
- Genus: Caquetaia
- Species: C. spectabilis

Binomial name
- Caquetaia spectabilis (Steindachner, 1875)

Synonyms
- Acara spectabilis Steindachner, 1875

= Caquetaia spectabilis =

Species of fish

Caquetaia spectabilis is a species of fish endemic to the basins of the Amazon River, Madeira River, and Uatumã River, as well as the Araguari and the Branco Rivers. The species is an ambush predator that lives among the vegetation on the banks of its habitat rivers.
