= Farlowella jauruensis =

Conservation status
- Least Concern (IUCN 3.1)

Scientific classification
- Kingdom: Animalia
- Phylum: Chordata
- Class: Actinopterygii
- Order: Siluriformes
- Family: Loricariidae
- Genus: Farlowella
- Species: F. jauruensis

Binomial name
- Farlowella jauruensis C. H. Eigenmann & Vance, 1917

Species of fish

Farlowella jauruensis is a species of freshwater ray-finned fish belonging to the family Loricariidae, the suckermouth armored catfishes, and the subfamily Loricariinae, the mailed catfishes. This catfish is endemic to Brazil where it occurs in the Jauru River in Mato Grosso, the type locality, with more recent records from Mato Grosso do Sul in the Engano stream, Taboco River and Taquari River. This species reaches a standard length of 13.1 cm (5.2 in).
