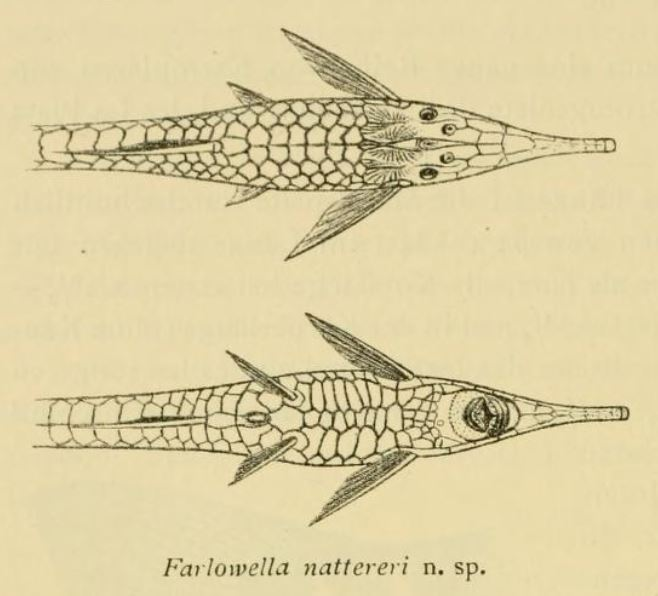

Conservation status
- Least Concern (IUCN 3.1)

Scientific classification
- Kingdom: Animalia
- Phylum: Chordata
- Class: Actinopterygii
- Order: Siluriformes
- Family: Loricariidae
- Genus: Farlowella
- Species: F. nattereri

Binomial name
- Farlowella nattereri Steindachner, 1910

Synonyms
- Farlowella hargreavesi C. H. Eigenmann, 1912; Farlowella azygia C. H. Eigenmann & Vance, 1917; Farlowella acestrichthys Pearson, 1924

= Farlowella nattereri =

Species of fish

Farlowella nattereri is a species of freshwater ray-finned fish belonging to the family Loricariidae, the suckermouth armored catfishes, and the subfamily Loricariinae, the mailed catfishes. This catfish is found in Bolivia, Brazil, Colombia, Ecuador, Guyana and Peru. It occurs in the upper Essequibo and Amazon basins. This species grows to a maximum standard length of 26.5 cm (10.4 in).

== Etymology ==
Farlowella nattereri has the specific name nattereri, this honors the Austrian naturalist Johann Natterer who collected specimens in South America for 18 years, including the holotype of this species.
