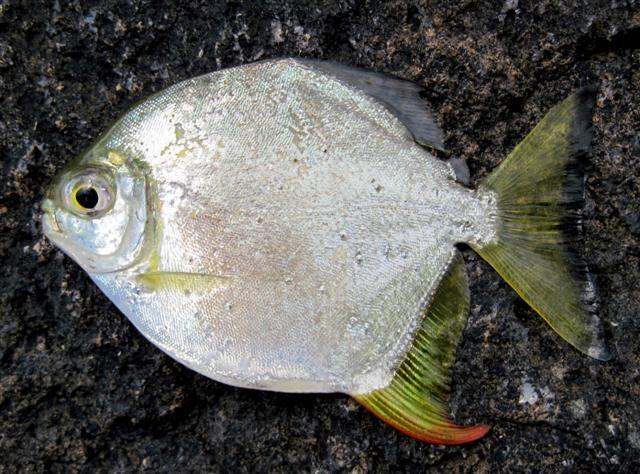
- Para, Brazil

Conservation status
- Least Concern (IUCN 3.1)

Scientific classification
- Kingdom: Animalia
- Phylum: Chordata
- Class: Actinopterygii
- Order: Characiformes
- Family: Serrasalmidae
- Genus: Myloplus
- Species: M. arnoldi

Binomial name
- Myloplus arnoldi Ahl, 1936

Synonyms
- Myleus arnoldi (Ahl, 1936)

= Myloplus arnoldi =

Species of fish

Myloplus arnoldi, Arnold's pacu or yellow fin red hook silver dollar, is a species of freshwater ray-finned fish belonging to the family Serrasalmidae, which includes the pacus and piranhas. This fish is endemic to Brazil.

== Taxonomy ==
Myloplus arnoldi was first formally described in 1936 by the German zoologist Ernst Ahl, with its type locality given as the Amazon River. The genus Myloplus is classified in the subfamily Myleinae, of the family Serrasalmidae, which is classified in the suborder Characoidei of the order Characiformes.

Myloplus sensu lato has been recovered as polyphyletic in some molecular phylogenetic studies, and M. arnoldi is not classified within Myloplus sensu stricto in these studies, although no new genus name has been proposed.

== Etymology ==
Myloplus arnoldi is classified within the genus Myloplus. This taxon was originally proposed as a subgenus of Myletes, this being a name which has been suppressed by the International Commission on Zoological Nomenclature as a synonym of Alestes. The proposer of this genus, Theodore Gill, did not explain its etymology. It may be a combination of mylo-, a reference to the disk-shaped body, and a prefix used for similarly-shaped fishes in the same family, with plus, which means "more", i.e., another Myleus-like genus. The specific name honours the German aquarist Johann Paul Arnold, who donated the type specimens to the Natural History Museum, Berlin.

== Description ==
Myloplus arnoldi can be told apart from other pacus by its vivid yellow and red fins, and by the highly elongated hook-shaped anal fin.

This species has a maximum published total length of 33 cm (13 in) and a maximum published weight of 1.3 kg (2.9 lb).

== Distribution and habitat ==
Myloplus arnoldi is endemic to Brazil, where it is found in the drainages of the Xingu, Tocantins, Trombetas, Jari and Juruena rivers. This species also occurs in the Caiapó River in the Araguaia River system. M. arnoldi is found in the states of Amapá, Goiás, Mato Grosso and Pará. The juveniles prefer clear water, and the adults occur in the vicinity of rapids.
