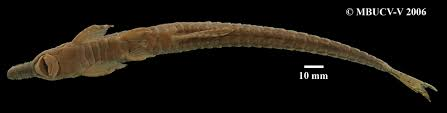

Scientific classification
- Kingdom: Animalia
- Phylum: Chordata
- Class: Actinopterygii
- Order: Siluriformes
- Family: Loricariidae
- Genus: Farlowella
- Species: F. martini

Binomial name
- Farlowella martini Fernández-Yépez, 1972

= Farlowella martini =

Species of fish

Farlowella martini is a species of freshwater ray-finned fish belonging to the family Loricariidae, the mailed catfishes, and the subfamily Loricariinae, the armored suckermouth catfishes. This catfish is found in coastal drainages on the Caribbean coast of Venezuela. This species reaches a standard length of 19.3 cm (7.6 in).

The specific name honors Felipe J. Martín Salazar, a Venezuelan ichthyologist who revised the Venezuelan species of the genus Farlowella in 1964.
