= Farlowella henriquei =

Conservation status
- Data Deficient (IUCN 3.1)

Scientific classification
- Kingdom: Animalia
- Phylum: Chordata
- Class: Actinopterygii
- Order: Siluriformes
- Family: Loricariidae
- Genus: Farlowella
- Species: F. henriquei

Binomial name
- Farlowella henriquei A. Miranda-Ribeiro, 1918

Species of fish

Farlowella henriquei is a species of freshwater ray-finned fish belonging to the family Loricariidae, the suckermouth armored catfishes, and the subfamily Loricariinae, the mailed catfishes. This catfish is endemic to Brazil where it occurs in the Araguaia River and Tocantins River basins in the state of Goiás. This species reaches a standard length of 17.5 cm (6.9 in).

The specific name honors Capt. Henrique Silva, who collected the holotype.
