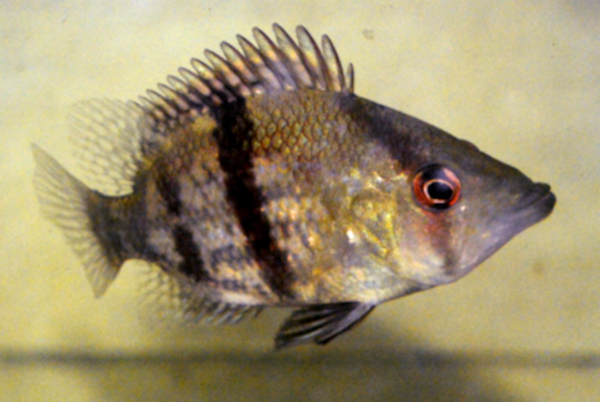
- Caquetaia myersi

Scientific classification
- Domain: Eukaryota
- Kingdom: Animalia
- Phylum: Chordata
- Class: Actinopterygii
- Order: Cichliformes
- Family: Cichlidae
- Subfamily: Cichlinae
- Tribe: Heroini
- Genus: Caquetaia; Fowler, 1945

Type species
- Caquetaia amploris Fowler, 1945

= Caquetaia =

Genus of fishes

Caquetaia is a small genus of cichlid fishes from tropical South America. The genus currently contains three species. Caquetaia spp. are ambush predators that predominantly feed on invertebrates. Seasonal fluctuations in water level have been shown to contribute to Caquetaia spp. consuming a larger variety of invertebrates, especially when the water level is low during dry seasons. Caquetaia are known for their highly protrusible jaws, an adaptation hypothesized to improve their ability to capture prey by enhancing overall ram velocity.

== Species ==
There are currently three recognized species in this genus:

- Caquetaia kraussii (Steindachner, 1878)
- Caquetaia myersi (L. P. Schultz, 1944)
- Caquetaia spectabilis (Steindachner, 1875)

The turquoise (or umbee) cichlid was formerly included, but is now placed in its own genus Kronoheros.
