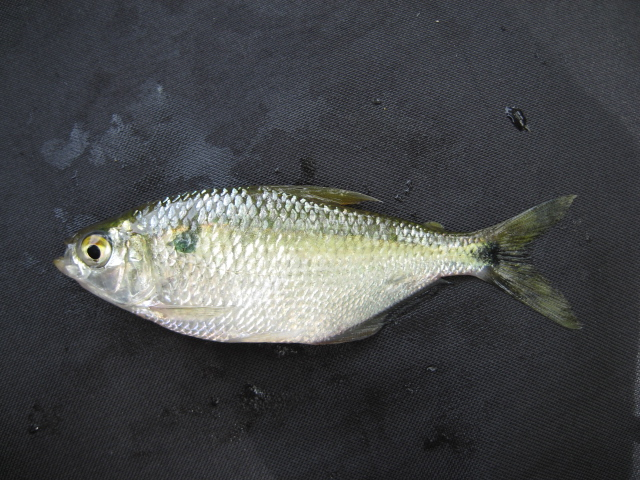

Conservation status
- Least Concern (IUCN 3.1)

Scientific classification
- Kingdom: Animalia
- Phylum: Chordata
- Class: Actinopterygii
- Division: Teleostei
- Order: Characiformes
- Family: Acestrorhamphidae
- Genus: Astyanax
- Species: A. caucanus

Binomial name
- Astyanax caucanus (Steindachner, 1879)

Synonyms
- Tetragonopterus caucanus Steindachner, 1879

= Astyanax caucanus =

Species of fish

Astyanax caucanus is a species of freshwater ray-finned fish belonging to the family Acestrorhamphidae, the American characins. This fish is endemic to Colombia. While little research exists regarding its ecological habits, such as diet and mating practices, its environment preferences are known to include marshy lowlands, and it easily lives in sympatry with various other fish species in the Cauca and Magdalena river basins. It is not known to share a habitat with any other species of Astyanax, but has a noted phyletic relationship to a group of congeners including Astyanax filiferus, Astyanax stilbe, and Astyanax magdalenae.

Congener Astyanax atratoensis has been noted to bear a strong visual resemblance to A. caucanus, and researchers as early as 1908 were commenting on a possible relationship. It is unknown if this remains the case, as A. atratoensis and A. caucanus no longer share a subgenus; A. caucanus has been considered a member of subgenus Zygogaster since its description, and A. atratoensis has been moved from Zygogaster to Poecilurichthys by recent research.

== Taxonomy ==
When originally described by Austrian ichthyologist Franz Steindachner in 1879, A. caucanus was assigned the name Tetragonopterus caucanus. Otherwise, it lacks any synonyms.

There are three subgenera in Astyanax - Astyanax, Poecilurichthys, and Zygogaster - and A. caucanus has been placed in Zygogaster, making its full name Astyanax (Zygogaster) caucanus. Four other species originally shared this subgenus: Astyanax stilbe, Astyanax atratoensis, Astyanax magdalenae, and Astyanax filiferus. In 1908, German-American ichthyologist Carl H. Eigenmann remarked that A. atratoensis may be one of the more closely related species to A. caucanus. Based on modern understandings, this may not remain the case; recent research places A. atratoensis in the subgenus Poecilurichthys. (The others remain in Zygogaster.) In 1917, Eigenmann also remarked upon the close relationship between A. caucanus and A. stilbe.

=== Etymology ===
The genus name "Astyanax" is an allusion to the Iliad, a Greek epic poem in which Astyanax was the son of Trojan prince Hector. The reasoning behind this was not made clear in the nominal text, but modern etymologists suspect that the appearance of type species Astyanax argentatus may be responsible; its scales are large and silvery, perhaps comparable to armor or a shield. The subgenus name "Zygogaster" originates in Greek, wherein "zygos" means pair or balanced, and "gaster" means belly, referring to the symmetrical scales on either side of the ventral midline. The specific epithet "caucanus" refers to the Río Cauca, Colombia, which is the type locality of the species.

Astyanax caucanus lacks a common name. "Cauca tetra" has been suggested based on the type locality and specific name.

== Description ==
Collected specimens of A. caucanus range from 3.6 to 17.0 cm (1.4–6.7 in) standard length (SL, without the tail fin). There are 11 rays in the dorsal fin, 36–41 rays in the anal fin (most often 38), and 36–42 scales in the lateral line (most often 38). There are 7 or 8 scale rows both above and below the lateral line. When compared with congeners A. filiferus and A. magdalenae from the same subgenus, A. caucanus presents with a somewhat more generalized morphology, while the other two are more specialized for their environments. Sexual dimorphism is unknown.

Astyanax caucanus bears a strong resemblance to congener Astyanax atratoensis, and the shared features include coloration. A. caucanus is an iridescent silver with a slightly darker back and a lateral stripe in a lighter silver; this lateral stripe starts at a vertically elongate humeral spot and ends at a blotch of pigment on the caudal peduncle. When preserved in alcohol, the scales are largely light-brown and the fins are paler than the body. The lateral stripe remains silvery, and the eye turns a silvery brown.

== Distribution and ecology ==
Astyanax caucanus was originally described from the Cauca River Basin in Colombia, and is solely recorded from the country (located in the far northwest of South America). Since discovery, additional populations have been documented in the Magdalena River Basin, another basin in Colombia. It appears not to live in regions above 900 meters (approx. 3000 feet) in elevation, making it a lowland species.

Astyanax caucanus has been noted to inhabit swampy areas. In aquatic macrophyte patches (multicellular plants, as opposed to algae) of the Ayapel Swamp Complex in Colombia, A. caucanus is one of a small handful of species that makes up a great deal of the biomass; other common species with which it coexists in the same region include Eigenmannia virescens, Roeboides dayi, Cyphocharax magdalenae, Triportheus magdalenae, Caquetaia kraussii, and Aequidens latifrons.

Details regarding other ecological aspects, such mating practices, dietary needs, and behavior, are sparse.

== Conservation status ==
The IUCN considers A. caucanus a species of least concern due to a wide range and a lack of active threats. Because A. caucanus is an abundant and hardy species, it is unlikely that any factors will have a severe negative impact on population levels. Its native range, however, may be facing ongoing environmental pressures.

A 2007 article from Colombian newspaper El Tiempo regarding the Cauca suggests pollution rates as high as 500 tons of residual waste per day. Mines for sand, bauxite, gold, and coal all contribute to this, as well as cities along the river's length, though not as much as industrial pollutants. To counter this and other factors, the upper Cauca is the subject of an ongoing restoration effort.

The Magdalena is also subject to various negative factors, including climate change, invasive species, deforestation, and water pollution, all of which were described in detail as part of one 2022 study performed to reassess the river's importance to the region, and therefore to reassess how high it should be prioritized as a conservation project. Conservation of the Magdalena would not only benefit aquatic species like A. caucanus, but would also benefit the 80% of Colombia's population that lives in the basin.
