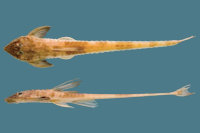

Scientific classification
- Kingdom: Animalia
- Phylum: Chordata
- Class: Actinopterygii
- Order: Siluriformes
- Family: Loricariidae
- Genus: Farlowella
- Species: F. curtirostra

Binomial name
- Farlowella curtirostra G. S. Myers, 1942

= Farlowella curtirostra =

Species of fish

Farlowella curtirostra is a species of freshwater ray-finned fish belonging to the family Loricariidae, the suckermouth armored catfishes, and the subfamily Loricariinae, the mailed catfishes. This catfish is found in the Lake Maracaibo drainage of Venezuela. This species grows to a standard length of 15.0 cm (5.9 in).
