= Farlowella hasemani =

Conservation status
- Data Deficient (IUCN 3.1)

Scientific classification
- Kingdom: Animalia
- Phylum: Chordata
- Class: Actinopterygii
- Order: Siluriformes
- Family: Loricariidae
- Genus: Farlowella
- Species: F. hasemani

Binomial name
- Farlowella hasemani C. H. Eigenmann & Vance, 1917

Species of fish

Farlowella hasemani is a species of freshwater ray-finned fish belonging to the family Loricariidae, the suckermouth armored catfishes, and the subfamily Loricariinae, the mailed catfishes. This catfish is endemic to Brazil where it is found in Pará. This species reaches a standard length of 17 cm (6.7 in).

The specific name honors the American zoologist and explorer John Diederich Haseman, who collected the holotype.
