= Paracanthocobitis mandalayensis =

Mandalay zipper loach

Scientific classification
- Domain: Eukaryota
- Kingdom: Animalia
- Phylum: Chordata
- Class: Actinopterygii
- Order: Cypriniformes
- Family: Nemacheilidae
- Genus: Paracanthocobitis
- Species: P. mandalayensis

Binomial name
- Paracanthocobitis mandalayensis (Rendahl (de), 1948)

Synonyms
- Nemachilus rubidipinnis mandalayensis Rendahl, 1948

Species of fish

Paracanthocobitis mandalayensis also known as the Mandalay zipper loach is a species of ray-finned fish in the genus Paracanthocobitis. This species is known from the Irrawaddy drainage of northeastern Myanmar, Sittang basin of southern Myanmar, and the Wang and Ping rivers in the Chao Phraya River basin of northwestern Thailand.
