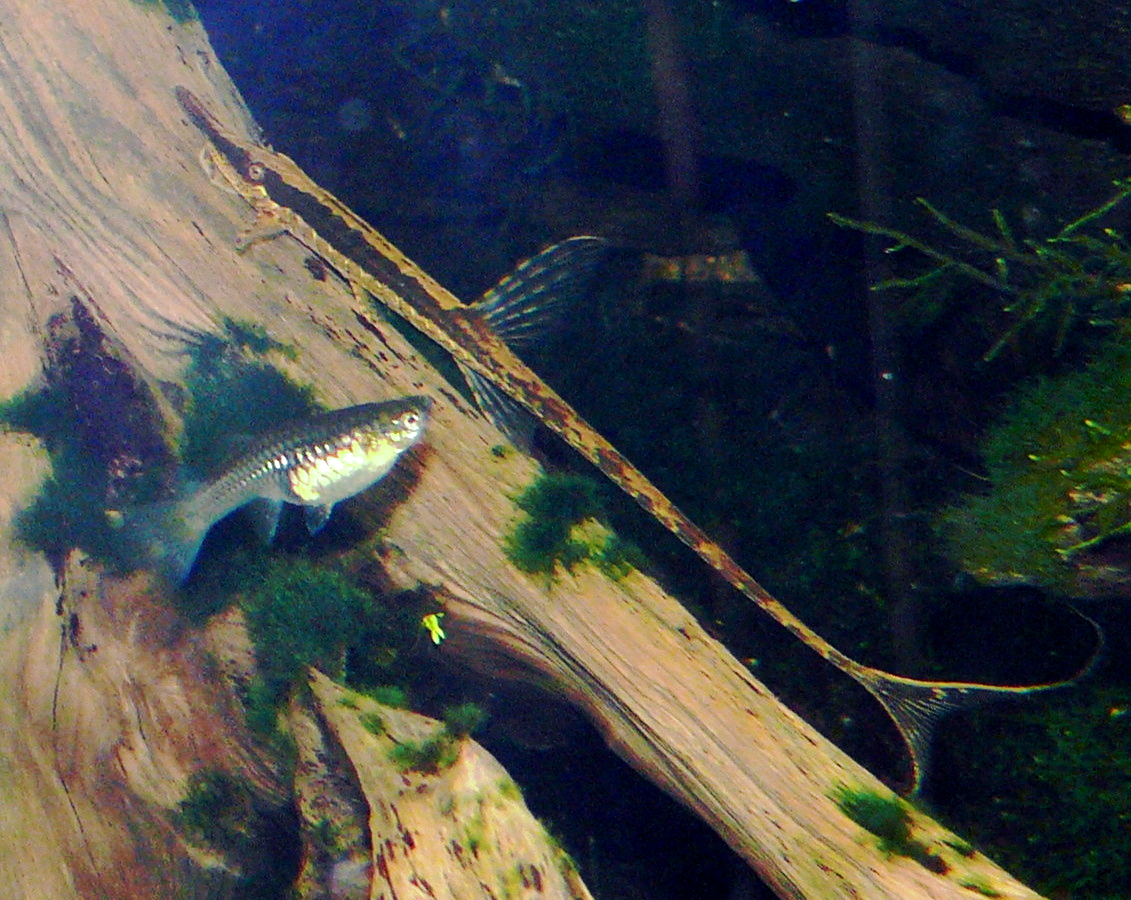
- Farlowella acus

Scientific classification
- Kingdom: Animalia
- Phylum: Chordata
- Class: Actinopterygii
- Division: Teleostei
- Order: Siluriformes
- Family: Loricariidae
- Subfamily: Loricariinae
- Genus: Farlowella; C. H. Eigenmann & R. S. Eigenmann, 1889

Type species
- Acestra acus Kner, 1853

Synonyms
- Acestra Kner, 1853; Aposturisoma Isbrücker, Britski, Nijssen & Ortega, 1983

= Farlowella =

Genus of fishes

Farlowella is a genus of freshwater ray-finned fishes belonging to the family Loricariidae, the suckermouth armored catfishes, and the subfamily Loricariinae, the mailed catfishes. The catfishes in this genus are found in South America. It is broadly distributed in the Amazon, Orinoco and Paraná rivers as well as coastal rivers of the Guyana Shield, but absent from the Pacific slope of the Andes and from the coastal rivers of the Brazilian Shield. Species of this genus have an extremely slender and elongated body resembling a thin stick of wood. There is a pronounced rostrum and the body is brownish with two dark stripes beginning at the tip of the rostrum, passing over the eyes and ending at the caudal fin, which are periodically interrupted on the caudal peduncle. Many species are kept in aquariums.

== Taxonomy ==
The genus has been placed within the tribe Harttiini of the subfamily Loricariinae by some authorities. Morphological, molecular and phylogenetic studies have recovered Farlowella as sister to Sturisoma. The genus is named in honor of William Gilson Farlow, a famous American botanist of Harvard University whose main work concerned algae, the favorite food of species in the genus.

== Species ==
Farlowella contains the following valid species:

- Farlowella acus (Kner, 1853)
- Farlowella altocorpus Retzer, 2006
- Farlowella amazonum (Günther 1864)
- Farlowella azpelicuetae Terán, Ballen, Alonso, Aguilera & Mirande, 2019
- Farlowella curtirostra Myers, 1942
- Farlowella gianetii Ballen, Pastana & Peixoto, 2016
- Farlowella gladiolus (Günther, 1864)
- Farlowella gracilis Regan, 1904
- Farlowella hahni Meinken, 1937
- Farlowella hasemani C. H. Eigenmann & Vance, 1917
- Farlowella henriquei A. Miranda-Ribeiro, 1918
- Farlowella isbruckeri Retzer & Page, 1997
- Farlowella jauruensis C. H. Eigenmann & Vance, 1917
- Farlowella kirane Dopazo, Deprá, Zawadzki & Britto, 2025
- Farlowella knerii (Steindachner, 1882)
- Farlowella mariaelenae Martín Salazar, 1964
- Farlowella martini Fernández-Yépez, 1972
- Farlowella mitoupibo Ballen, Urbano-Bonilla & Zamudio, 2016
- Farlowella myriodon (Isbrücker, Britski, Nijssen & Ortega, 1983)
- Farlowella nattereri Steindachner, 1910
- Farlowella odontotumulus Retzer & Page, 1997
- Farlowella oxyrryncha (Kner, 1853)
- Farlowella paraguayensis Retzer & Page, 1997
- Farlowella reticulata Boeseman, 1971
- Farlowella rugosa Boeseman, 1971
- Farlowella schreitmuelleri Arnold, 1936
- Farlowella smithi Fowler, 1913
- Farlowella taphorni Retzer & Page, 1997
- Farlowella venezuelensis Martín Salazar, 1964
- Farlowella vittata Myers, 1942
- Farlowella wuyjugu Dopazo, Wosiacki & Britto, 2023
- Farlowella yarigui Ballen & Mojica, 2014
