= Paracanthocobitis rubidipinnis =

Cherryfin zipper loach

Conservation status
- Least Concern (IUCN 3.1)

Scientific classification
- Kingdom: Animalia
- Phylum: Chordata
- Class: Actinopterygii
- Order: Cypriniformes
- Family: Nemacheilidae
- Genus: Paracanthocobitis
- Species: P. rubidipinnis

Binomial name
- Paracanthocobitis rubidipinnis (Blyth, 1860)

Synonyms
- Acanthocobitis rubidipinnis Blyth, 1860

Species of fish

Paracanthocobitis rubidipinnis also known as the cherryfin zipper loach is a species of ray-finned fish in the genus Paracanthocobitis. This species is known from the Irrawaddy basin in Myanmar.
