= Farlowella mitoupibo =

Conservation status
- Vulnerable (IUCN 3.1)

Scientific classification
- Kingdom: Animalia
- Phylum: Chordata
- Class: Actinopterygii
- Order: Siluriformes
- Family: Loricariidae
- Genus: Farlowella
- Species: F. mitoupibo

Binomial name
- Farlowella mitoupibo Ballen, Urbano-Bonilla & Zamudio, 2016

Species of catfish

Farlowella mitoupibo is a species of freshwater ray-finned fish belonging to the family Loricariidae, the suckermouth armored catfishes, and the subfamily Loricariinae, the mailed catfishes. This catfish is found in South America, where it occurs in the upper Guaviare River, which is part of the Orinoco basin in Colombia. This species reaches a standard length of 19.3 cm (7.6 in). It was described in 2016 by Gustavo A. Ballen, Alexander Urbano-Bonilla and Jhon Zamudio. Its specific name, mitoupibo, is derived from the Guahibo name for fishes of the genus Farlowella.
