= Farlowella gracilis =

Conservation status
- Data Deficient (IUCN 3.1)

Scientific classification
- Kingdom: Animalia
- Phylum: Chordata
- Class: Actinopterygii
- Order: Siluriformes
- Family: Loricariidae
- Genus: Farlowella
- Species: F. gracilis

Binomial name
- Farlowella gracilis Regan, 1904

Synonyms
- Farlowella boliviana Steindachner, 1910

Species of fish

Farlowella gracilis is a species of freshwater ray-finned fish belonging to the family Loricariidae, the suckermouth armored catfishes, and the subfamily Loricariinae, the mailed catfishes. This catfish is endemic to Colombia where it is found in the Caqueta River basin. This species reaches a standard length of at least 25.5 cm (10.0 in).
