= Paracanthocobitis aurea =

Barred zipper loach

Scientific classification
- Kingdom: Animalia
- Phylum: Chordata
- Class: Actinopterygii
- Order: Cypriniformes
- Suborder: Cobitoidei
- Family: Nemacheilidae
- Genus: Paracanthocobitis
- Species: P. aurea

Binomial name
- Paracanthocobitis aurea (F. Day, 1872)

Synonyms
- Nemacheilus aureus Day, 1872

Species of fish

Paracanthocobitis aurea also known as the barred zipper loach is a species of ray-finned fish in the genus Paracanthocobitis. This species is known only from the type locality, the Narmada River at Jabalpur, state of Madhya Pradesh, India.
