= Farlowella schreitmuelleri =

Conservation status
- Least Concern (IUCN 3.1)

Scientific classification
- Kingdom: Animalia
- Phylum: Chordata
- Class: Actinopterygii
- Order: Siluriformes
- Family: Loricariidae
- Genus: Farlowella
- Species: F. schreitmuelleri

Binomial name
- Farlowella schreitmuelleri Arnold, 1936

Synonyms
- Farlowella latisoma A. Miranda-Ribeiro, 1939

Species of fish

Farlowella schreitmuelleri a species of freshwater ray-finned fish belonging to the family Loricariidae, the suckermouth armored catfishes, and the subfamily Loricariinae, the mailed catfishes. This catfish is endemic to Brazil where it is found in the lower Amazon basin. This species grows to a length of 18.1 centimetres (7.1 in) SL.

== Etymology ==
The fish is named in honor of German aquarist Wilhelm Schreitmüller (1870–1945), who had provided the holotype. Although the name is often credited to Ahl 1937, Arnold made the name available in an aquarium publication (Taschenkalender für Aquarien-und Terrarienfreunde) before Ahl's description was published.
