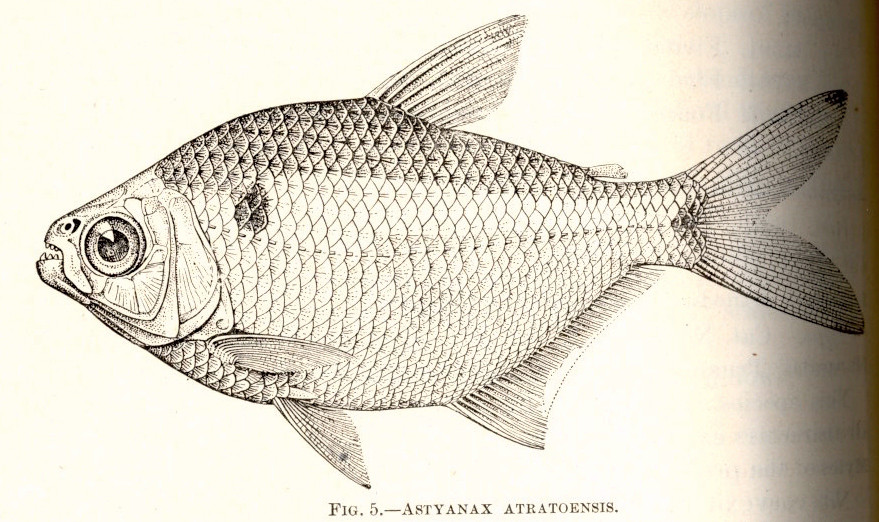
- 1907 illustration

Conservation status
- Least Concern (IUCN 3.1)

Scientific classification
- Kingdom: Animalia
- Phylum: Chordata
- Class: Actinopterygii
- Order: Characiformes
- Family: Acestrorhamphidae
- Genus: Ctenobrycon
- Species: C. atratoensis

Binomial name
- Ctenobrycon atratoensis (C. H. Eigenmann, 1907)

Synonyms
- Astyanax atratoensis C.H. Eigenmann, 1907

= Ctenobrycon atratoensis =

Species of fish

Ctenobrycon atratoensis is a species of freshwater ray-finned fish belonging to the family Acestrorhamphidae, the American characins. This species occurs in the Atrato River basin in Colombia. Originally described from a tributary therein, the Truandó River, it gets its specific epithet from the region. Though it faces no imminent threats, C. atratoensis inhabits waterways with a history of severe environmental pressure in the form of anthropogenic pollution. Several restoration efforts have been undertaken in the relevant regions.

Populations exist at both low and high elevations, and have adapted to their respective surroundings; higher-elevation specimens have deeper bodies than lower-elevation ones. The color pattern, however, remains the same - largely silver, with a reflective silver lateral stripe and a small blotch of pigment on the caudal peduncle. It also has an ovoid humeral spot with vertical elongation, which can be used to differentiate it from similar congeners.

== Taxonomy ==
Ctenobrycon atratoensis was first described by prolific German-American ichthyologist Carl H. Eigenmann in 1907, with findings published in the relevant edition of the Proceedings of the United States National Museum. The article was co-authored by Fletcher Ogle, a fellow ichthyologist. The type specimen has since gone missing, though when this happened is unknown.

In the nominal article, Eigenmann remarked that C. atratoensis is closely related to Astyanax caucanus, which was named by Austrian ichthyologist Franz Steindachner in 1879. Further, it is related to multiple other species of Astyanax that all share the subgenus Zygogaster, to which C. atratoensis was originally designated. More modern interpretations often place it in the subgenus Poecilurichthys.

=== Etymology ===
Given that C. atratoensis is endemic to the Atrato River basin in Colombia, its specific epithet originates therein.

== Description ==
Ctenobrycon atratoensis is subrhomboidal in body shape, and commonly reaches a maximum length of roughly 10.3 cm (4.1 in) standard length (SL). It is possible for the fish to reach nearly twice that length, however; specimens from a particular delta in the Arato River were as large as 21.5 cm (8.5 in) total length. It is largely an iridescent silver, with a distinct humeral spot of a vertically elongated oval shape. There is a silver lateral stripe that terminates at a small dark blotch on the caudal peduncle.

There are between 35 and 39 rays in the anal fin (depending on the source consulted), which can be used as an identifying characteristic when comparing C. atratoensis to similar congeners. The dorsal fin has 10–11 rays, and the predorsal series of scales is incomplete. Though environment can affect morphology, resulting in a deeper body at higher elevations, separate populations of A. atratoensis do not demonstrate differences severe enough to warrant confusion with another species.

== Distribution and ecology ==
Ctenobrycon atratoensis is endemic to its namesake, the Atrato River basin in Colombia. Its type locality is the Truandó River. It can be found at both high and low elevations within the basin, and the environment in which a particular specimen was found can have an impact on its morphology. Specifically, populations of C. atratoensis at higher elevations have a deeper body than those at lower elevations, which are more fusiform. The reasons for this differentiation are unclear, but current hypotheses include differing riparian zones, hydrological features like current speed, and risk of exposure to predatory birds.

Other members of the genus in regions with healthy riparian vegetation tend to be adaptable omnivores that consume plentiful allochthonous material. When it comes to the dietary needs and preferences of C. atratoensis in particular, details are sparse.

== Conservation status ==
Ctenobrycon atratoensis is considered a species of least concern by the IUCN. Despite a somewhat restricted distribution, nothing currently serves as an imminent threat to population levels, and so C. atratoensis is not endangered.

Its native range, however, may face some environmental pressure. The Atrato River basin has a history of severe pollution. Nonetheless, recent action - most notably a court ruling in 2016 - has prompted conservation and cleanup efforts, largely on the part of the Colombian government. The 2016 ruling sought out a different approach to conservation in that, rather than enacting protective legislation, the Colombian Constitutional Court recognized the river as its own distinct entity deserving of protection and restoration, as a human would be; as of 2021, this had resulted in only minor project implementation, with several larger aspects still in the planning stages.
