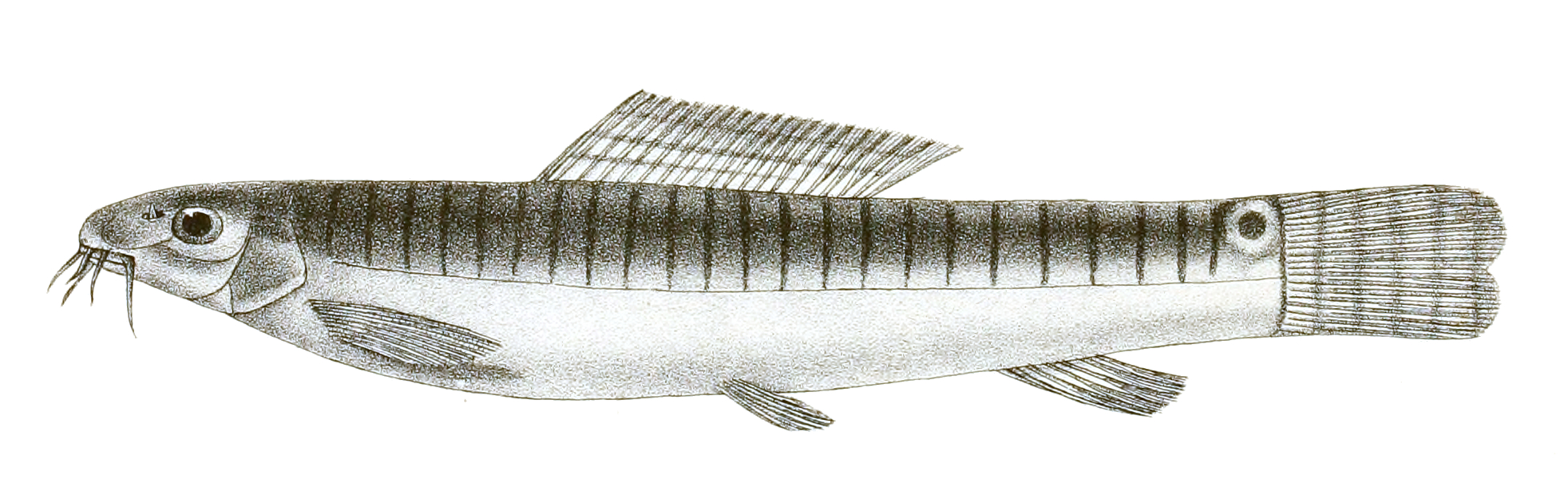
- Acanthocobitis pavonacea

Scientific classification
- Domain: Eukaryota
- Kingdom: Animalia
- Phylum: Chordata
- Class: Actinopterygii
- Order: Cypriniformes
- Family: Nemacheilidae
- Genus: Acanthocobitis; Peters, 1861

Type species
- Acanthocobitis longipinnis Peters 1861

= Acanthocobitis =

Genus of fishes

Acanthocobitis is a genus of freshwater ray-finned fish of the stone loach family, Nemacheilidae. Recent work has suggested that the genus be split into two with the former subgenus Paracanthocobitis being raised to a full species, leaving just the type species, Acanthocobitis pavonacea, in the current genus.

== Species ==
The following species are included in Acanthocobitis:

- Acanthocobitis longipinnis Peters, 1861
- Acanthocobitis pavonacea (McClelland, 1839) (Spearfin loach)
