= Farlowella smithi =

Conservation status
- Least Concern (IUCN 3.1)

Scientific classification
- Kingdom: Animalia
- Phylum: Chordata
- Class: Actinopterygii
- Order: Siluriformes
- Family: Loricariidae
- Genus: Farlowella
- Species: F. smithi

Binomial name
- Farlowella smithi Fowler, 1913

Species of fish

Farlowella smithi is a species of freshwater ray-finned fish belonging to the family Loricariidae, the suckermouth armored catfishes, and the subfamily Loricariinae, the mailed catfishes. This catfish is found in the Amazon basin in Bolivia, Brazil, Colombia and Peru (and possibly also in Paraguay). This species reaches a standard length of 10 cm (3.9 in).

The specific name honors the collector of the holotype, Edgar A. Smith, an American railway engineer who was tasked by the Brazilian government to oversee the construction of a railway along the Madeira River.
