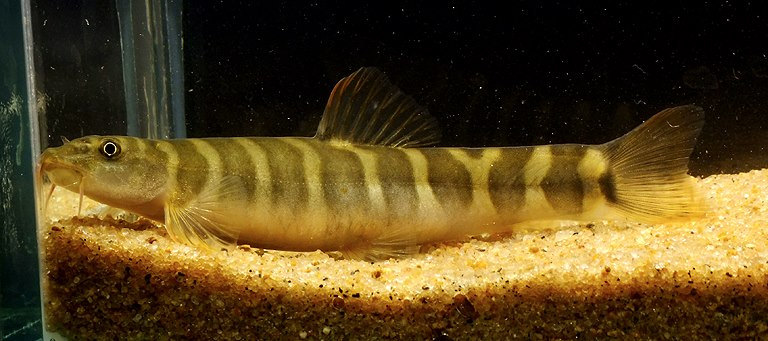

Conservation status
- Endangered (IUCN 3.1)

Scientific classification
- Kingdom: Animalia
- Phylum: Chordata
- Class: Actinopterygii
- Order: Cypriniformes
- Family: Nemacheilidae
- Genus: Paracanthocobitis
- Species: P. urophthalma

Binomial name
- Paracanthocobitis urophthalma (Günther, 1868)

Synonyms
- Acanthocobitis urophthalma Günther, 1868

= Paracanthocobitis urophthalma =

Banded mountain zipper loach

Species of fish

Paracanthocobitis urophthalma, also known as the banded mountain zipper loach, is a species of ray-finned fish in the genus Paracanthocobitis. This species is endemic to southwestern Sri Lanka.
