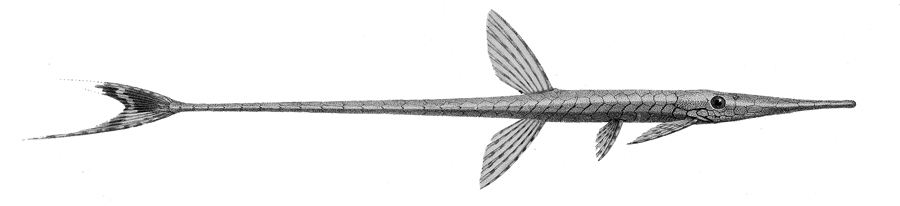

Conservation status
- Least Concern (IUCN 3.1)

Scientific classification
- Kingdom: Animalia
- Phylum: Chordata
- Class: Actinopterygii
- Order: Siluriformes
- Family: Loricariidae
- Genus: Farlowella
- Species: F. knerii

Binomial name
- Farlowella knerii (Steindachner, 1882)

Synonyms
- Acestra knerii Steindachner, 1882

= Farlowella knerii =

Species of fish

Farlowella knerii is a species of freshwater ray-finned fish belonging to the family Loricariidae, the suckermouth armored catfishes, and the subfamily Loricariinae, the mailed catfishes. This catfish is found in Ecuador and Peru. This species reaches a standard length of 16.2 cm (6.4 in).

The specific name honors the Austrian ichthyologist Rudolf Kner, a friend and colleague of Franz Steindachner, who also described species in the genus Farlowella.
