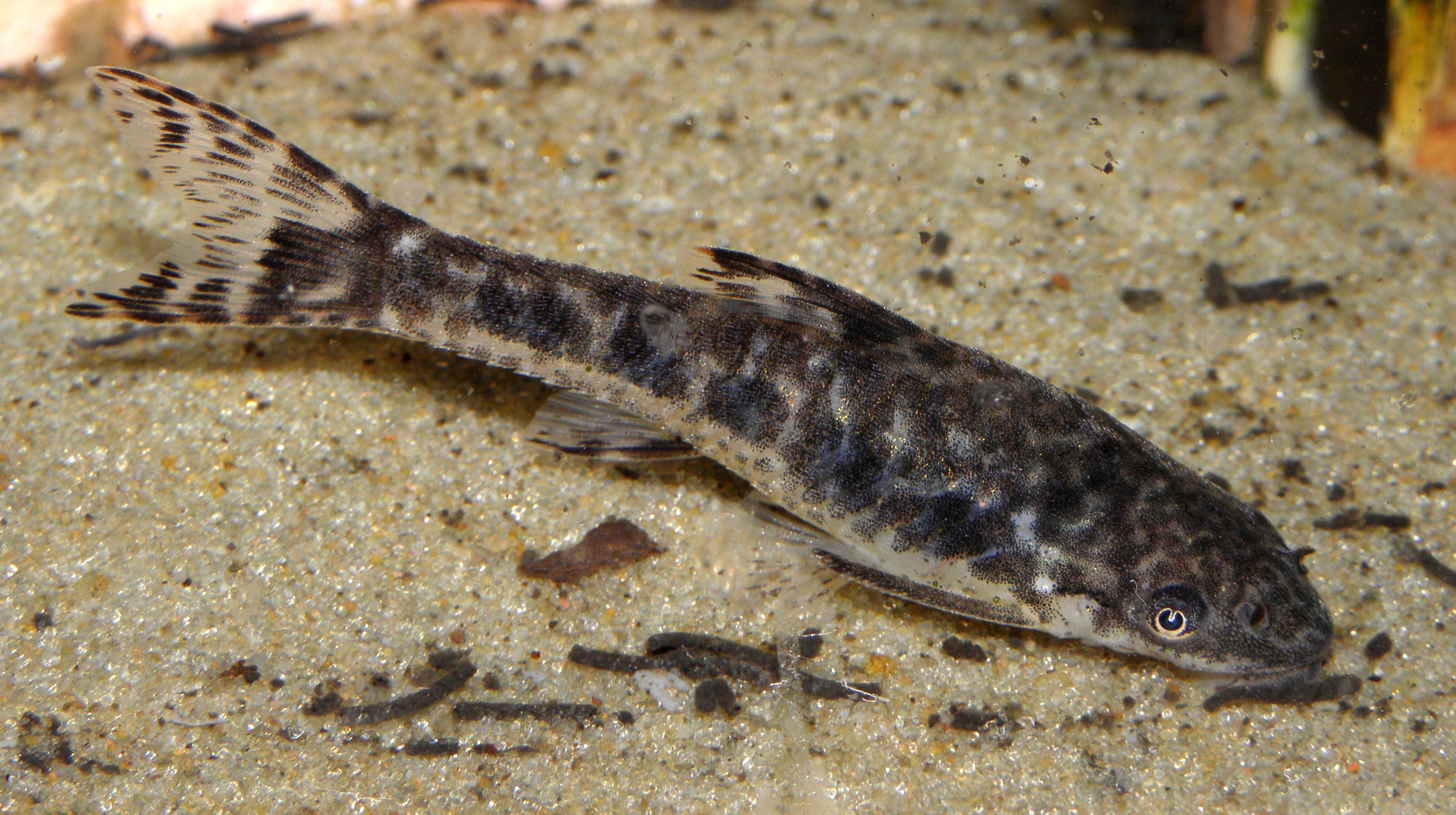

Conservation status
- Least Concern (IUCN 3.1)

Scientific classification
- Kingdom: Animalia
- Phylum: Chordata
- Class: Actinopterygii
- Order: Siluriformes
- Family: Loricariidae
- Genus: Otocinclus
- Species: O. arnoldi

Binomial name
- Otocinclus arnoldi Regan, 1909

= Otocinclus arnoldi =

Species of fish

Otocinclus arnoldi is a species of freshwater ray-finned fish belonging to the family Loricariidae, the suckermouth armored catfishes, and the subfamily Hypoptopomatinae, the cascudinhos. This catfish is found in South America, where it occurs in the lower río Paraná drainage, in the lower and middle rio Uruguai and in the río de La Plata in Argentina, Bolivia, Brazil, Paraguay and Uruguay. This species reaches a maximum standard length of 4.8 cm (1.9 in).

Otocinclus arnoldi has a specific name which honors the German aquarist Johann Paul Arnold, who gave the holotype to the British Museum (Natural History).

Otocinclus arnoldi is traded in the aquarium trade.
