= Farlowella venezuelensis =

Conservation status
- Endangered (IUCN 3.1)

Scientific classification
- Kingdom: Animalia
- Phylum: Chordata
- Class: Actinopterygii
- Order: Siluriformes
- Family: Loricariidae
- Genus: Farlowella
- Species: F. venezuelensis

Binomial name
- Farlowella venezuelensis Martín Salazar, 1964

Species of fish

Farlowella venezuelensis is a species of freshwater ray-finned fish belonging to the family Loricariidae, the suckermouth armored catfishes, and the subfamily Loricariinae, the mailed catfishes. This catfish is endemic to Venezuela where it is found in the drainage of the Gulf of Paria, occurring in the rivers Guarapiche, Cocoyal, Quiriquire, Punceres and Colorado. This species reaches a standard length of 16.2 cm (6.4 in).
