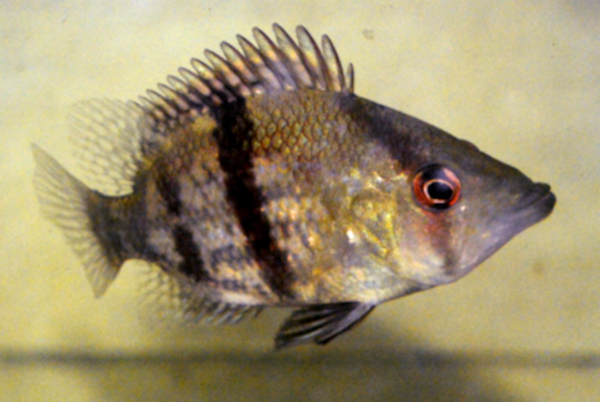

Conservation status
- Least Concern (IUCN 3.1)

Scientific classification
- Kingdom: Animalia
- Phylum: Chordata
- Class: Actinopterygii
- Order: Cichliformes
- Family: Cichlidae
- Genus: Caquetaia
- Species: C. myersi

Binomial name
- Caquetaia myersi (L. P. Schultz, 1944)

Synonyms
- Petenia myersi Schultz, 1944; Caquetaia amploris Fowler, 1945

= Caquetaia myersi =

Species of fish

Caquetaia myersi is a species of fish, a large predatory cichlid, which is endemic to the basin of the Amazon River, specifically the Putumayo and Napo rivers of Ecuador and Colombia. The specific name honours the American ichthyologist George S. Myers (1905-1985) of Stanford University, who first noticed that this was a different species of fish but did not formally describe it. The fish is a protrusible-mouthed predator. The juveniles are omnivorous but the large adults are carnivorous.
