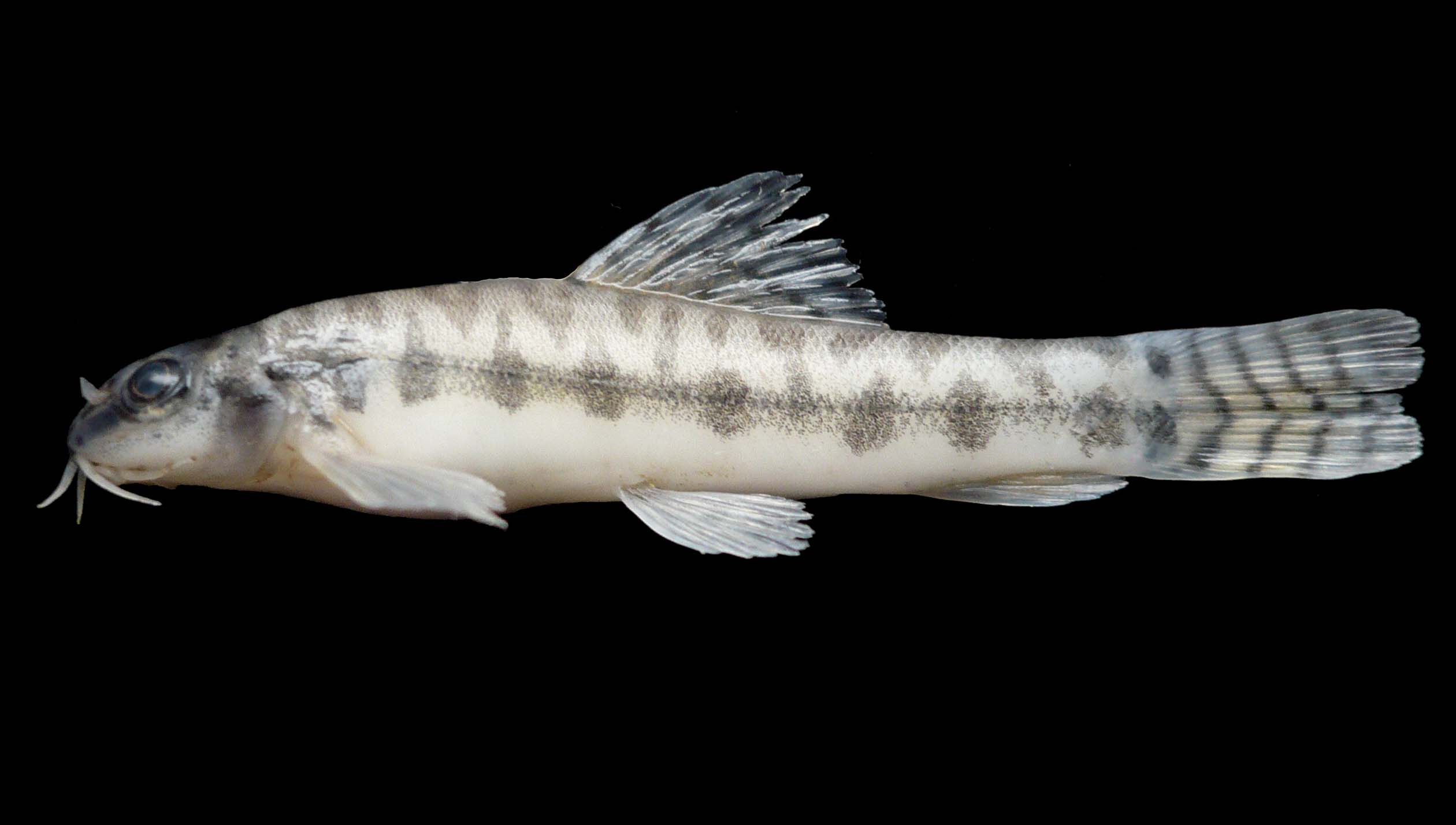

Conservation status
- Least Concern (IUCN 3.1)

Scientific classification
- Kingdom: Animalia
- Phylum: Chordata
- Class: Actinopterygii
- Order: Cypriniformes
- Family: Nemacheilidae
- Genus: Paracanthocobitis
- Species: P. zonalternans

Binomial name
- Paracanthocobitis zonalternans (Blyth, 1860)

Synonyms
- Acanthocobitis zonalternans Blyth, 1860

= Paracanthocobitis zonalternans =

Dwarf zipper loach

Species of fish

Paracanthocobitis zonalternans also known as the dwarf zipper loach is a species of ray-finned fish in the genus Paracanthocobitis. This species is known from Bangladesh, Myanmar, Thailand, and peninsular Malaysia. It is found in the Brahmaputra, Meghna, Irrawaddy, Sittang, Salween, Maeklong, and drainages in peninsular Thailand and Malaysia. The range extends from northern Myanmar to peninsular Malaysia. It is not known from the Chao Phraya basin.
