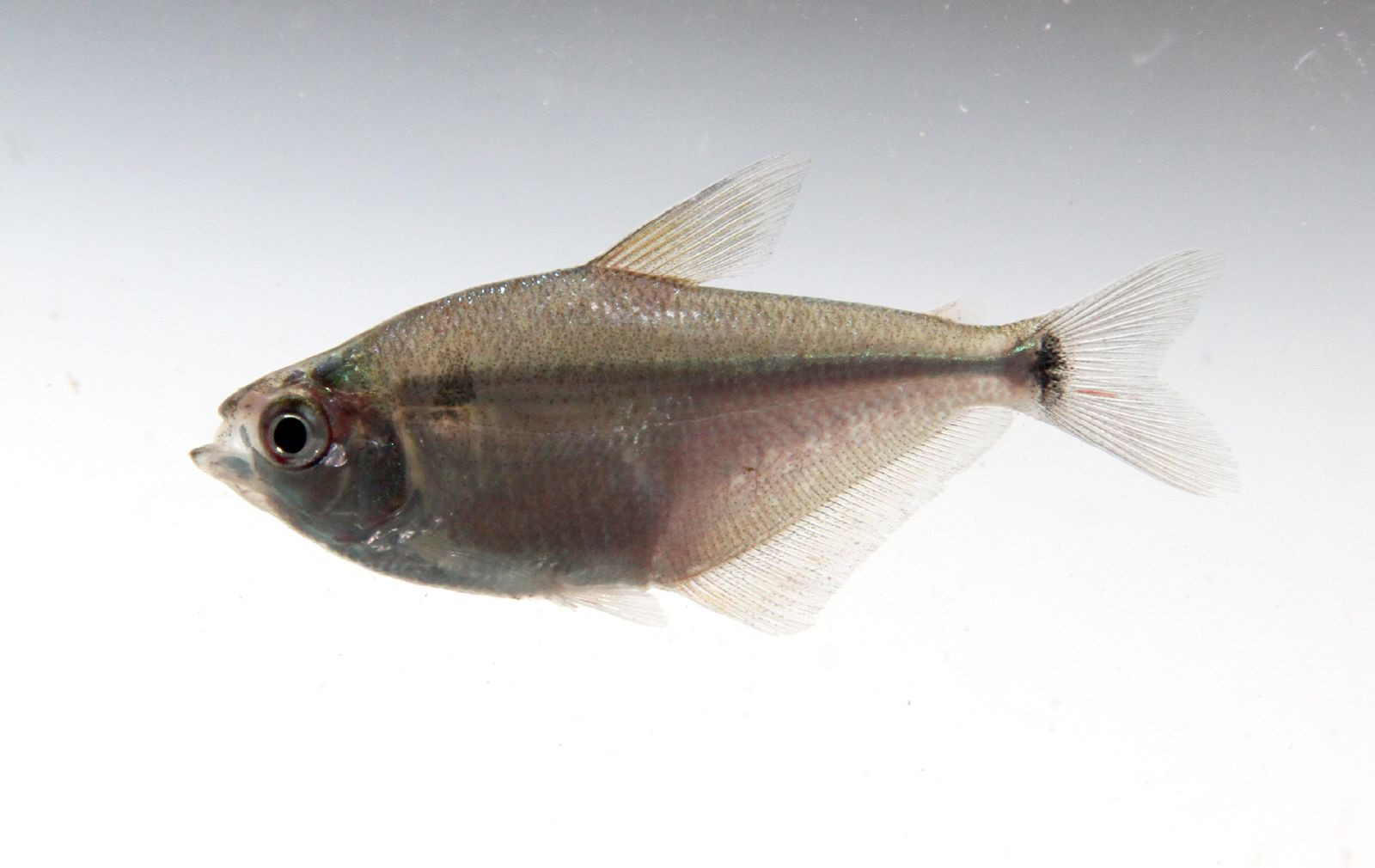
- C. hauxwellianus

Scientific classification
- Kingdom: Animalia
- Phylum: Chordata
- Class: Actinopterygii
- Order: Characiformes
- Family: Acestrorhamphidae
- Subfamily: Acestrorhamphinae
- Genus: Ctenobrycon; C. H. Eigenmann, 1908

Type species
- Tetragonopterus hauxwellianus Cope, 1870

Synonyms
- Apodastyanax Fowler, 1911; Psellogrammus C. H. Eigenmann, 1908

= Ctenobrycon =

Genus of fishes

Ctenobrycon is a genus of fresnwater ray-finned fishes belonging to the family Acestrorhamphidae, the American characins. The fishes in this genus are found in tropical South America.

Ctenobrycon species can be located is fresh water in tropical climates in South America, commonly in calm waters.

Their diet includes zooplankton, plants, worms, insects, and crustaceans.

An adult female can produce an average of 2,000 eggs. The fry hatch about 50 to 70 hours later, and after the third day look for food.

== Species ==
Ctenonrycon contains the following valid species;

- Ctenobrycon atratoensis (C. H. Eigenmann, 1907)
- Ctenobrycon hauxwellianus (Cope, 1870)
- Ctenobrycon kennedyi (C. H. Eigenmann, 1903)
- Ctenobrycon magdalenae (C. H. Eigenmann & Henn, 1916)
- Ctenobrycon multiradiatus (Steindachner, 1876)
- Ctenobrycon oliverai Benine, Lopes & Ron, 2010
- Ctenobrycon spilurus (Valenciennes, 1850)
