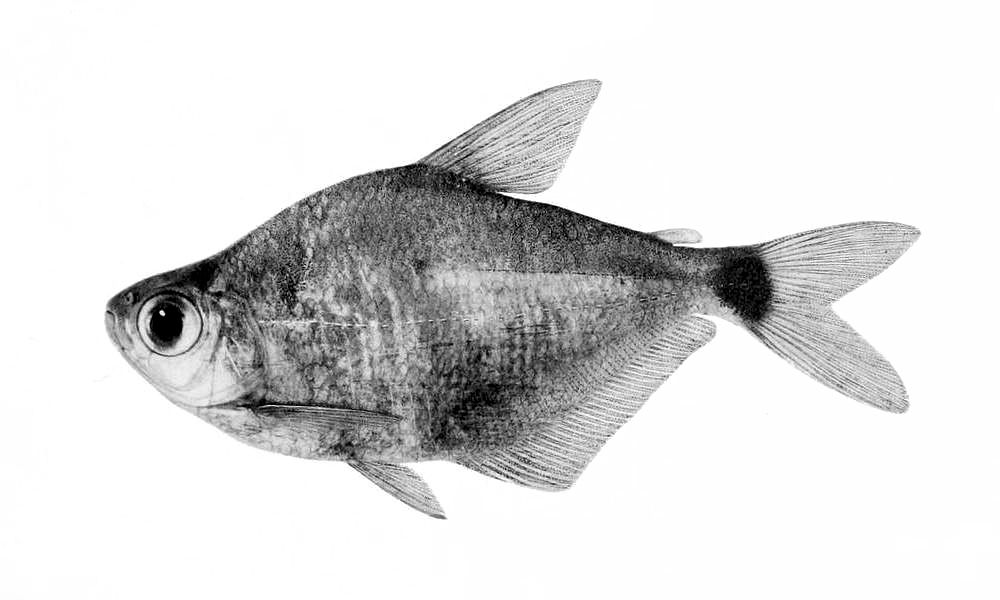
- 1917 figure from book 'The American Characidae'

Conservation status
- Least Concern (IUCN 3.1)

Scientific classification
- Kingdom: Animalia
- Phylum: Chordata
- Class: Actinopterygii
- Order: Characiformes
- Family: Acestrorhamphidae
- Genus: Ctenobrycon
- Species: C. kennedyi

Binomial name
- Ctenobrycon kennedyi (C. H. Eigenmann, 1903)

Synonyms
- Hemigrammus kennedyi C. H. Eigenmann, 1903; Psellogrammus kennedyi (C. H. Eigenmann, 1903)

= Ctenobrycon kennedyi =

Genus of fishes

Ctenobrycon kennedyi is a species of freshwater ray-finned fish belonging to the family Acestrorhamphidae, the American characins. This fish is found in Argentina, Brazil, and Paraguay It is found in the Paraguay and São Francisco River basins. It is sometimes classified as the only species in the monospecific genus Psellogrammus.

The fish is named in honor of Clarence Hamilton Kennedy (1879-1952), Eigenmann’s student, later a renowned entomologist, who co-authored work on Paraguayan fishes in which appeared this description.
