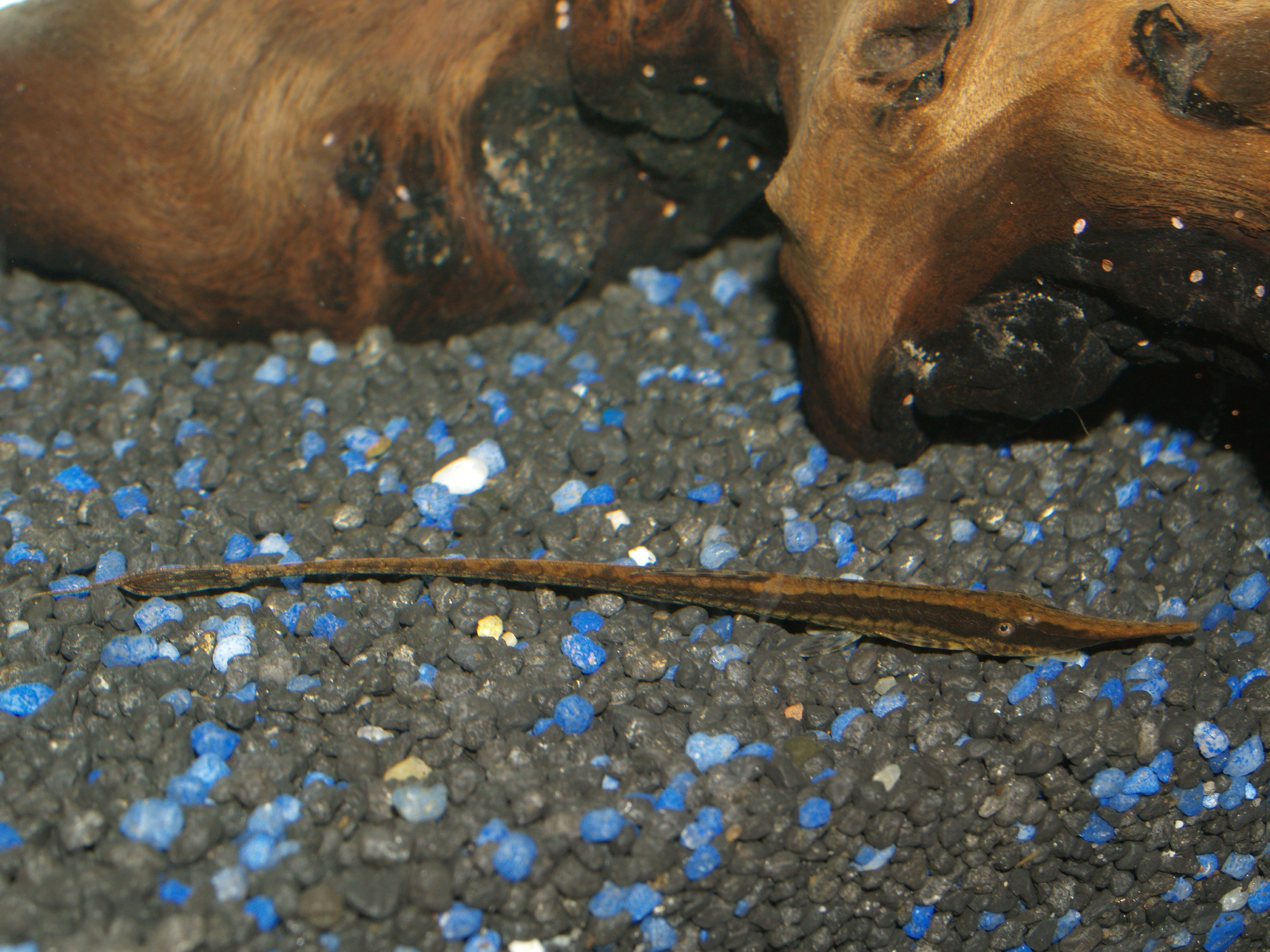

Conservation status
- Least Concern (IUCN 3.1)

Scientific classification
- Kingdom: Animalia
- Phylum: Chordata
- Class: Actinopterygii
- Division: Teleostei
- Order: Siluriformes
- Family: Loricariidae
- Genus: Farlowella
- Species: F. vittata

Binomial name
- Farlowella vittata G. S. Myers, 1942

Synonyms
- Farlowella angosturae Martín Salazar, 1964; Farlowella guaricensis Martín Salazar, 1964; Farlowella agustini Martín Salazar, 1964; Farlowella roncallii Martín Salazar, 1964

= Farlowella vittata =

Species of fish

Farlowella vittata is a species of freshwater ray-finned fish belonging to the family Loricariidae, the suckermouth armored catfishes, and the subfamily Loricariinae, the mailed catfishes. This catfish is found in Colombia and Venezuela. This species reaches a standard length of 22.5 cm (8.9 in).

== Breeding ==
The female lays the eggs on a surface during the night and the male fertilizes them. The male then stays near the eggs to protect them from predators to and ensure fungus does not grow on the eggs. By day 3, the fry can be seen moving within the eggs and, by day 5, the fry are clearly visible as fish.

By day 6, the eggs start to hatch and all have hatched by day 9. The fry are very small, and because this catfish is a limnivore, the fry need a well planted set up in an aquarium, in order to get the amount of algae needed for survival and growth.
