= Farlowella myriodon =

Conservation status
- Critically Endangered (IUCN 3.1)

Scientific classification
- Kingdom: Animalia
- Phylum: Chordata
- Class: Actinopterygii
- Order: Siluriformes
- Family: Loricariidae
- Genus: Farlowella
- Species: F. myriodon

Binomial name
- Farlowella myriodon (Isbrücker, Britski, Nijssen & H. Ortega, 1983)

Synonyms
- Aposturisoma myriodon Isbrücker, Britski, Nijssen & Ortega, 1983

Species of ray-finned fish

Farlowella myriodon is a species of freshwater ray-finned fish belonging to the family Loricariidae, the suckermouth armored catfishes, and the subfamily Loricariinae, the mailed catfishes. It was initially described in the only species in the genus Aposturisoma. This genus name derives from Greek apo- meaning "outside", German sturio meaning "sturgeon" and Greek soma meaning "body"; the whole referring to its outwardly similar appearance to a sturgeon. A 2021 study revealed that this species was embedded within Farlowella and therefore the genus was synonymised.

Farlowella myriodon is found in South America, where it occurs in the Aguaytia River basin in the Upper Amazon River drainage in Peru. This species is only known from its type location. This species is rheophilic, preferring to live in shallow, fast waters with a rubble substrate.

Farlowella myridon has a maximum standard length of 20.0 cm (7.9 in). It appears rather similar to other Farlowella, though it has a larger mouth, deeper and wider body, and thicker caudal peduncle.
