= Goldstripe rasbora =

Conservation status
- Data Deficient (IUCN 3.1)

Scientific classification
- Kingdom: Animalia
- Phylum: Chordata
- Class: Actinopterygii
- Order: Cypriniformes
- Family: Danionidae
- Subfamily: Rasborinae
- Genus: Rasbora
- Species: R. chrysotaenia

Binomial name
- Rasbora chrysotaenia Arnold, 1936

Species of fish

The goldstripe rasbora (Rasbora chrysotaenia) is a species of ray-finned fish in the genus Rasbora. It is a benthopelagic freshwater fish found in Malaysia and Indonesia.
