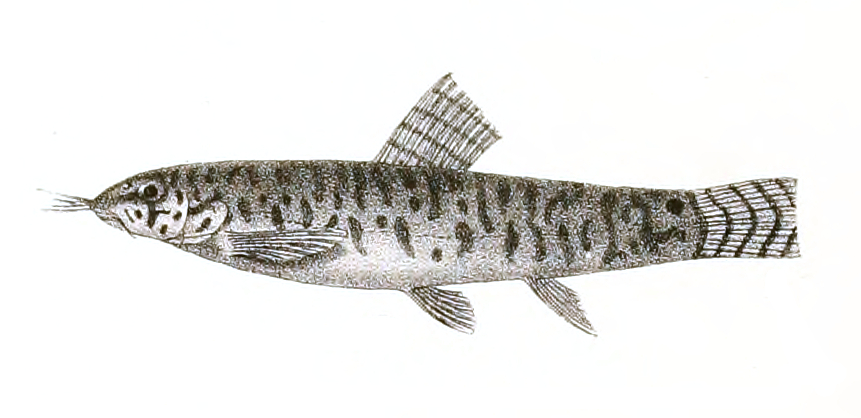

Conservation status
- Least Concern (IUCN 3.1)

Scientific classification
- Kingdom: Animalia
- Phylum: Chordata
- Class: Actinopterygii
- Order: Cypriniformes
- Family: Nemacheilidae
- Genus: Paracanthocobitis
- Species: P. mooreh

Binomial name
- Paracanthocobitis mooreh (Sykes, 1839)

Synonyms
- Cobitis mooreh Sykes, 1839; Nemacheilus mooreh (Sykes, 1839); Noemacheilus mooreh (Sykes, 1839); Nemacheilus sinuatus Day, 1870; Nemachilus sinuatus Day, 1870; Nemacheilus aureus Day, 1872

= Paracanthocobitis mooreh =

Maharashtra zipper loach

Species of fish

Paracanthocobitis mooreh also known as the Maharashtra zipper loach is a species of ray-finned fish in the genus Paracanthocobitis. This species is found in the Godavari, Krishna, and Kaveri basins of western and southern India.
