= Farlowella mariaelenae =

Conservation status
- Least Concern (IUCN 3.1)

Scientific classification
- Kingdom: Animalia
- Phylum: Chordata
- Class: Actinopterygii
- Order: Siluriformes
- Family: Loricariidae
- Genus: Farlowella
- Species: F. mariaelenae

Binomial name
- Farlowella mariaelenae Martín Salazar, 1964

Species of fish

Farlowella mariaelenae is a species of freshwater ray-finned fish belonging to the family Loricariidae, the suckermouth armored catfishes, and the subfamily Loricariinae, the mailed catfishes. This catfish is found in Colombia and Venezuela. This species reaches a standard length of 17 cm (6.7 in).

The specific name honors Felipe J. Martín Salazar's "great companion", his wife María Elena.
