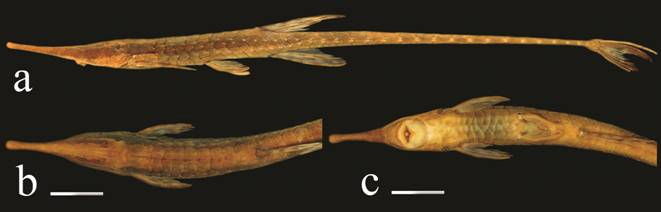
- Holotype specimen a) lateral, b) dorsal, and c) ventral views (scale bar: 1 cm)

Conservation status
- Near Threatened (IUCN 3.1)

Scientific classification
- Kingdom: Animalia
- Phylum: Chordata
- Class: Actinopterygii
- Order: Siluriformes
- Family: Loricariidae
- Genus: Farlowella
- Species: F. gianetii

Binomial name
- Farlowella gianetii Ballen, Pastana & L. A. W. Peixoto, 2016

= Farlowella gianetii =

Species of catfish

Farlowella gianetii is a species of freshwater ray-finned fish belonging to the family Loricariidae, the suckermouth armored catfishes, and the subfamily Loricariinae, the mailed catfishes. This catfish is found in South America where it occurs in the upper Xingu River basin in the state of Mato Grosso in Brazil. This species reaches a standard length of at least 12.1 cm (4.8 in).

== Taxonomy ==
Farlowella gianetii was described in 2016 by the Brazilian ichthyologists Gustavo A. Ballen, Murino N. L. Pastana and Luiz Peixoto with its type locality given as the Rio Couto de Magalhães at Campinápolis in the rio Xingu basin, Mato Grosso, Brazil at 13°50'17"S, 53°03'53"W. The genus Farlowella is placed in the tribe Hartiini by some authorities. This genus is classified in the subfamily Loricariinae of the family Loricariidae and the suborder Loricarioidei within the catfish order, Siluriformes.

== Etymology ==
Its specific name, gianetii, honors Dr. Michel Donato Gianeti, manager of the ichthyological collections of the University of São Paulo.
