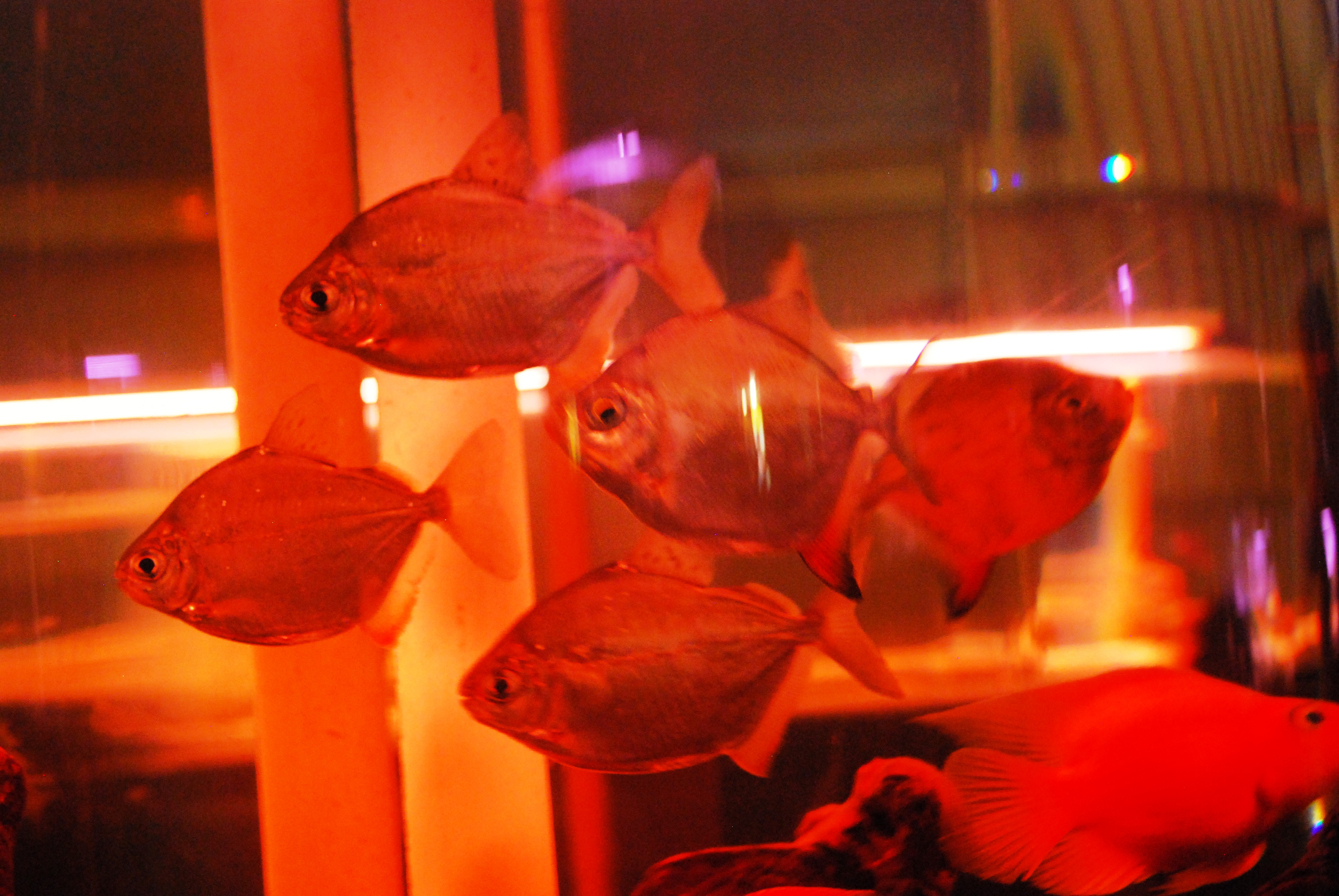

Conservation status
- Least Concern (IUCN 3.1)

Scientific classification
- Kingdom: Animalia
- Phylum: Chordata
- Class: Actinopterygii
- Order: Characiformes
- Family: Acestrorhamphidae
- Genus: Ctenobrycon
- Species: C. spilurus

Binomial name
- Ctenobrycon spilurus (Valenciennes, 1850)

Synonyms
- Tetragonopterus spilurus Valenciennes, 1850; Tetragonopterus gibbicervix Pellegrin, 1909; Apodastyanax stewardsoni Fowler, 1911

= Ctenobrycon spilurus =

Species of fish

Ctenobrycon spilurus, the silver tetra or silver dollar tetra, is a species of freshwater ray-finned fish belonging to the family Acestrorhamphidae, the American characins. This species occurs in the Orinoco River basin and coastal river basins of Guyana, Suriname and French Guiana, as well as Brazil and Venezuela, and can be found in shallow slow moving streams with heavy vegetation. With temperatures that range from 23–27 °C (73–81 °F). The fish can grow to a maximum length of 8.0 cm (3 1/4 in).

== Description ==
Silver tetras have a silvery-gray color and a round flattened body, with the occasional slight olive green cast. There is some black at the base of their caudal fin. Some have a small dark spot near their gill covers. The only relieving bit of color is a glow of red in the rear portion of the anal fin (only in males). The dorsal fin is fairly short. It has a small mouth with enlarged lips.

== In the aquarium ==
Commercially breed silver tetras are good for beginners. They are very active in daylight hours. The fish prefers a heavily planted aquarium with dim light. But an aquarium with plastic plants with driftwood will do too. As long as the fish have a place to hide. It is necessary to keep them in a school of 6–8 other silver tetras in a 30-gallon tank. That is 100 cm (39 in) long tank. With a pH range of 6.0–7.5. The temperature of the water should be 24–28 °C (75–82 °F). The fish are peaceful and can be kept with other non-aggressive fish.
