= Paracanthocobitis pictilis =

Ataran zipper loach

Scientific classification
- Kingdom: Animalia
- Phylum: Chordata
- Class: Actinopterygii
- Order: Cypriniformes
- Family: Nemacheilidae
- Genus: Paracanthocobitis
- Species: P. pictilis

Binomial name
- Paracanthocobitis pictilis (Kottelat, 2012)

Synonyms
- Acanthocobitis pictilis Kottelat, 2012

Species of fish

Paracanthocobitis pictilis, also known as the Ataran zipper loach, is a species of ray-finned fish in the genus Paracanthocobitis. It is native to Myanmar and Thailand. It was described to science in 2012.

This freshwater fish has dark brown triangular saddle-shaped markings along its side, slanted at the front end of the body and almost vertical toward the tail. The middle saddles are paler in color. Larger fish have paired saddle markings.

This species is known from the Ataran basin in eastern Myanmar north to Chedi Sam Ong, Three Pagoda Pass.
