= Farlowella reticulata =

Conservation status
- Least Concern (IUCN 3.1)

Scientific classification
- Kingdom: Animalia
- Phylum: Chordata
- Class: Actinopterygii
- Order: Siluriformes
- Family: Loricariidae
- Genus: Farlowella
- Species: F. reticulata

Binomial name
- Farlowella reticulata Boeseman, 1971

Species of fish

Farlowella reticulata is a species of freshwater ray-finned fish belonging to the family Loricariidae, the suckermouth armored catfishes, and the subfamily Loricariinae, the mailed catfishes. This catfish is found in French Guiana, Guyana and Suriname. This species grows to a maximum standard length of 17.5 cm (6.9 in).
