= Acestra =

Scientific classification
- Kingdom: Animalia
- Phylum: Arthropoda
- Class: Insecta
- Order: Hemiptera
- Suborder: Heteroptera
- Family: Alydidae
- Subfamily: Micrelytrinae
- Tribe: Micrelytrini
- Genus: Acestra; Dallas, 1852

Type species
- Acestra sinica Dallas, 1852

Genus of true bugs

Acestra is a genus of bugs, in the subfamily Micrelytrinae and tribe Micrelytrini. Species have been recorded from China and Peninsular Malaysia.

== Species ==
The Coreoidea.species file lists:

- Acestra malayana Distant, 1903
- Acestra sinica Dallas, 1852
- Acestra yunnana Hsiao, 1963

== Note and Links ==
- Acestra is a synonym of the fish genus Farlowella
- Data related to Acestra at Wikispecies
