= Farlowella altocorpus =

Conservation status
- Data Deficient (IUCN 3.1)

Scientific classification
- Kingdom: Animalia
- Phylum: Chordata
- Class: Actinopterygii
- Order: Siluriformes
- Family: Loricariidae
- Genus: Farlowella
- Species: F. altocorpus

Binomial name
- Farlowella altocorpus Retzer, 2006

Species of fish

Farlowella altocorpus is a species of freshwater ray-finned fish belonging to the family Loricariidae, the suckermouth armored catfishes, and the subfamily Loricariinae, the mailed catfishes. This catfish is endemic to Bolivia where it occurs in the Coroico River. This species grows to a length of 17.0 centimetres (6.7 in) SL.
