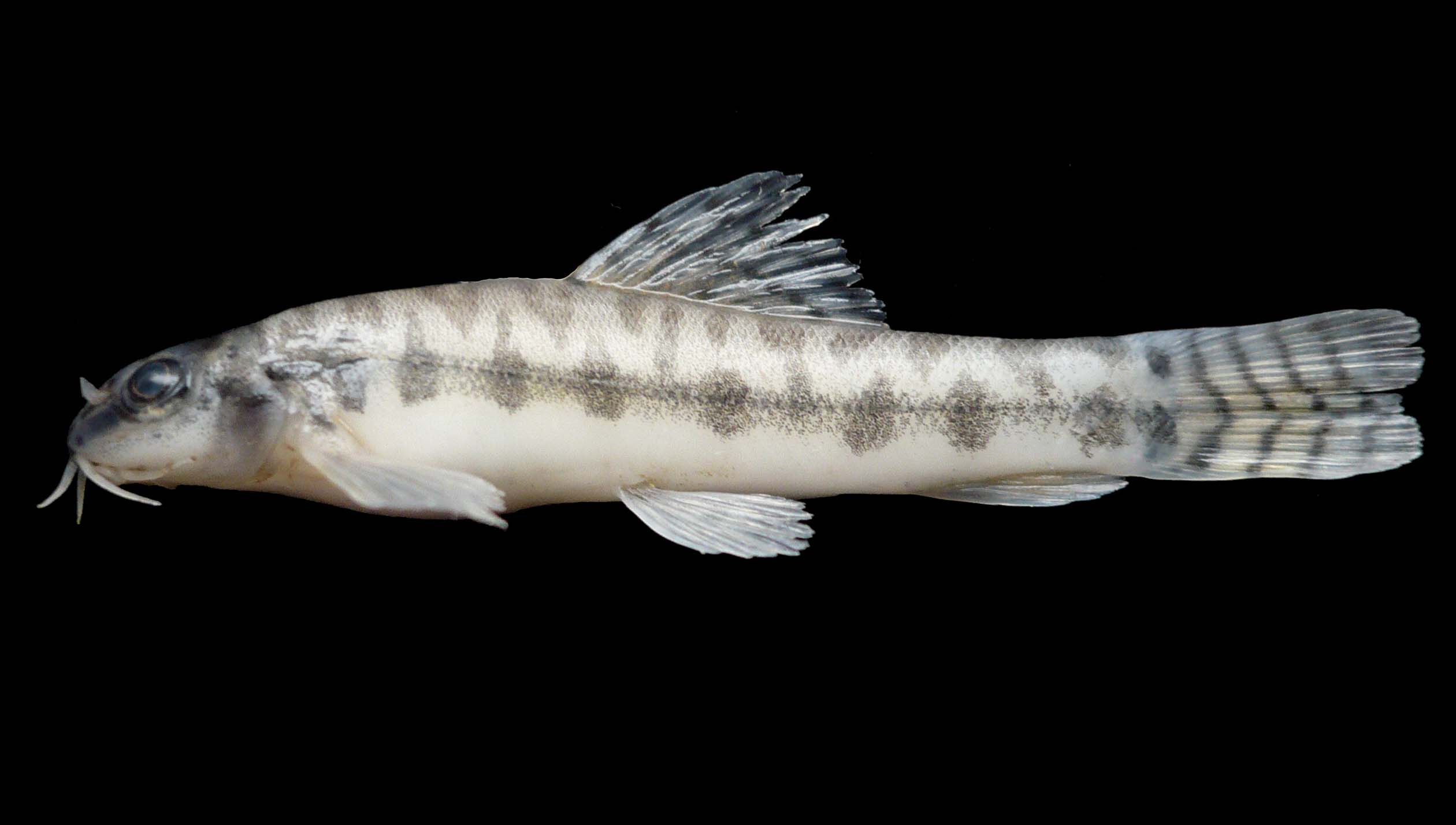
- Acanthocobitis (Paracanthocobitis) zonalternans

Scientific classification
- Kingdom: Animalia
- Phylum: Chordata
- Class: Actinopterygii
- Division: Teleostei
- Order: Cypriniformes
- Family: Nemacheilidae
- Genus: Paracanthocobitis; S. Grant, 2007

Type species
- Cobitis zonalternans Blyth, 1860

= Paracanthocobitis =

Genus of fishes

Paracanthocobitis is a genus of freshwater ray-finned fishes belonging to the family Nemacheilidae, the stone loaches. This genus is known from the Indus basin in Pakistan to the Mekong basin of Cambodia and Laos The type species is Paracanthocobitis zonalternans. Some authorities treat this as a subgenus of Acanthocobitis

== Species ==
These are the currently recognised species in this genus:

- Paracanthocobitis abutwebi R. A. Singer & Page, 2015 (Hillstream zipper loach)
- Paracanthocobitis adelaideae Singer & Page, 2015 (Checkerboard zipper loach)
- Paracanthocobitis aurea (Day, 1872) (Barred zipper loach)
- Paracanthocobitis botia (Hamilton, 1822) (mottled zipper loach)
- Paracanthocobitis canicula Singer & Page, 2015 (Houndstooth zipper loach)
- Paracanthocobitis epimekes Dvořák, Bohlen, Kottelat & Šlechtová, 2022
- Paracanthocobitis hijumensis Rime, Tamang & Das, 2022
- Paracanthocobitis linypha Singer & Page, 2015 (Sewing needle zipper loach)
- Paracanthocobitis mackenziei (B. L. Chaudhuri, 1910) (Robust zipper loach)
- Paracanthocobitis maekhlongensis Singer & Page, 2015 (Maekhlong zipper loach)
- Paracanthocobitis mandalayensis (Rendahl, 1948) (Mandalay zipper loach)
- Paracanthocobitis marmorata Singer, Pfeiffer & Page, 2017 (Marmorated zipper loach)
- Paracanthocobitis mooreh (Sykes, 1839) (Maharashtra zipper loach)
- Paracanthocobitis nigrolineata Singer, Pfeiffer & Page, 2017
- Paracanthocobitis phuketensis (Klausewitz, 1957)
- Paracanthocobitis pictilis (Kottelat, 2012) (Ataran zipper loach)
- Paracanthocobitis putaoensis Lin, Chen & Chen, 2023
- Paracanthocobitis rubidipinnis (Blyth 1860) (Cherryfin zipper loach)
- Paracanthocobitis triangula Singer, Pfeiffer & Page, 2017
- Paracanthocobitis urophthalma (Günther, 1868) (Banded mountain zipper loach)
- Paracanthocobitis zonalternans (Blyth, 1860) (Dwarf zipper loach)
