= Johann Paul Arnold =

German aquarist

Johann Paul Arnold (born October 1, 1869 in Thuringia; † July 1, 1952) was a German aquarist. It was through him that the first descriptions of many imported ornamental fish were made.

== Background ==
At the end of the 19th century and the beginning of the 20th century, it was mainly sailors who introduced ornamental fish to Europe. The businessman Johann Paul Arnold, who lived in Hamburg, was an enthusiastic aquarist and used his contacts with the sailors to report on the new introductions in words and pictures. By making connections with experts, he ensured that the imported fish could be accurately identified.

Many of these new provisions were given his name ("arnoldi").

== Taxon named in his honor ==
- The genus Arnoldichthys Myers 1926
- The Splash Tetra Copella arnoldi (Regan 1912)
- Arnold's Killifish Fundulopanchax arnoldi (Boulenger 1908)
- Myloplus arnoldi Ahl 1936
- Otocinclus arnoldi Regan 1909
- Pseudocheirodon arnoldi (Boulenger 1909)

== Taxon described by him ==
- Farlowella schreitmuelleri Arnold 1936
- Rasbora chrysotaenia Arnold 1936

== Publications ==
- Together with the zoologist Ernst Ahl, he wrote the book "Die fremdländischen Süßwasserfische" (The Foreign Freshwater Fishes) in 1936. For many years, this was considered a standard work in the field of the description of small aquarium fish.
- In 1904 he was also involved in the founding of the journal "Wochenschrift für Aquarien- und Terrarienkunde".
- Arnold, Johann Paul. 1935. "Apistogramma weisei E. Ahl, ein neuer Zwergcichlide". Wochenschrift für Aquarien- und Terrarienkunde. 32(51):801-802 (crc09293)
- Arnold, Johann Paul. 1911. "Acara thayeri Steindachner". Wochenschrift für Aquarien- und Terrarienkunde. 8(17):245-247 (crc06354)
- Arnold, Johann Paul. 1911. "Cichlosoma aureum, Günther". Wochenschrift für Aquarien- und Terrarienkunde. 8(51):757-759 (crc08252)
- Arnold, Johann Paul. 1909. "Heterogramma corumbae Eigenmann & Ward". Blätter für Aquarien- und Terrarienkunde. 20(20):305-308;(21):321-324 (crc08516)

== Breeding ==
He was also successful in breeding. In 1909, he succeeded in breeding guppies for the first time in the German-speaking world.

== Source ==
- Biographical information is based on a translation from an equivalent article at the German Wikipedia.
