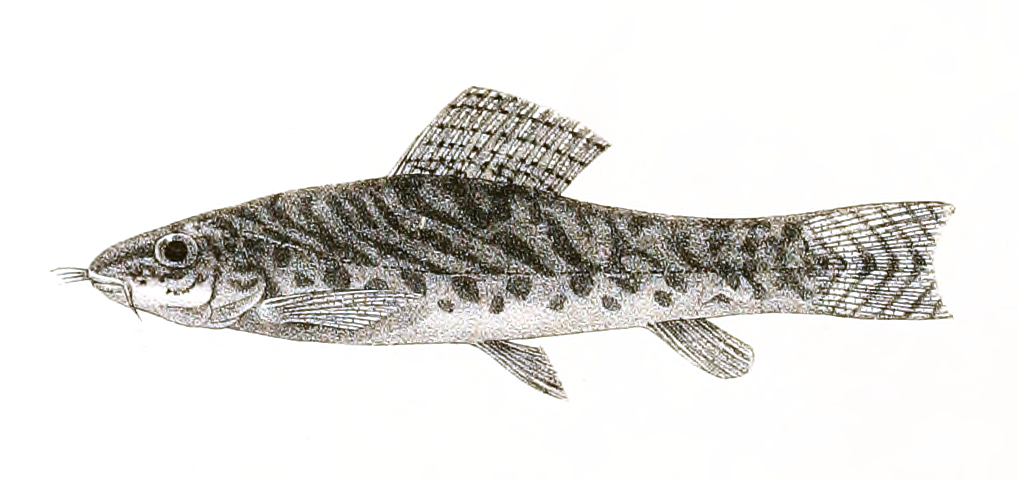

Conservation status
- Least Concern (IUCN 3.1)

Scientific classification
- Kingdom: Animalia
- Phylum: Chordata
- Class: Actinopterygii
- Order: Cypriniformes
- Family: Nemacheilidae
- Genus: Paracanthocobitis
- Species: P. botia

Binomial name
- Paracanthocobitis botia (F. Hamilton, 1822)

Synonyms
- Acanthocobitis botia (Hamilton, 1822); Cobitis botia Hamilton, 1822; Nemacheilus botia (Hamilton, 1822); Noemacheilus botia (Hamilton, 1822); Botia nebulosa Blyth, 1860; Nemachilus mackenziei Chaudhuri, 1910

= Paracanthocobitis botia =

Mottled zipper loach

Species of fish

Paracanthocobitis botia also known as the mottled zipper loach is a species of ray-finned fish in the genus Paracanthocobitis. This species is known from the mainstem, and possibly tributaries of the Brahmaputra River, in Assam, India.
