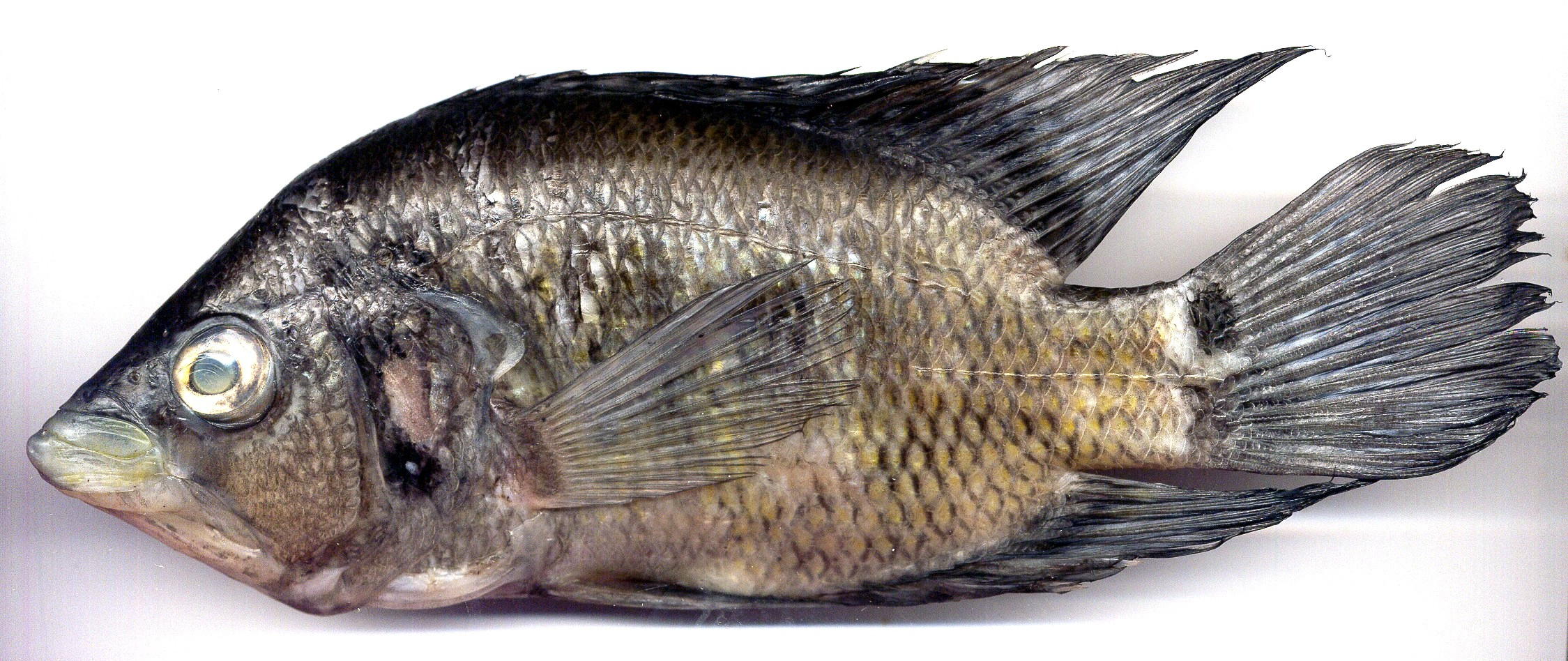

Scientific classification
- Domain: Eukaryota
- Kingdom: Animalia
- Phylum: Chordata
- Class: Actinopterygii
- Order: Cichliformes
- Family: Cichlidae
- Genus: Caquetaia
- Species: C. kraussii

Binomial name
- Caquetaia kraussii (Steindachner, 1878)

Synonyms
- Petenia kraussii Steindachner, 1878; Cichlasoma kraussii (Steindachner, 1878)

= Caquetaia kraussii =

Species of fish

Caquetaia kraussii is a species of fish endemic to the basin of the Atrato, Cauca, Magdalena, as well as the basin of Lake Maracaibo. The fish has been introduced to the Orinoco River basin. The specific name honours the German naturalist Christian F. F. Krauss (1812–1890) who was director of the Royal Natural History Cabinet in Stuttgart.

== Biology ==
Prefers swamps and marshes with abundant aquatic plants, but also found in rivers. Eats other fish and benthic invertebrates.
