= Hermann Meinken =

- Born: December 10, 1896; Bremen, Germany
- Died: June 22, 1976 (aged 79); Bremen, West Germany
- Known for: Describing numerous aquarium fish species; co-author of Die Aquarienfische in Wort und Bild
- Awards: Honorary doctorate, University of Bremen (1973); Doctor of Natural Sciences, University of Bremen (1974)
- Scientific career
- Fields: Ichthyology, Aquaristics
- Institutions: Various schools in Bremen; University of Bremen (honorary doctorate)

Hermann Meinken (10 December 1896 – 22 June 1976) was a German aquarist and amateur ichthyologist.

== Biography ==
Meinken worked for several years as a high school biology teacher. In 1951, together with Werner Ladiges and Hugo Weise, he founded the Commission for the Creation of German Fish Names in Hanover, which aimed to propose and establish German vernacular names for ornamental fish.

Between 1929 and 1975, Meinken described 57 new species of cichlids, killifish, and cyprinids. Of these, 24 species remain valid today, including Hengel's rasbora (Trigonostigma hengeli), which he named in 1956 after Dutch aquarist J. F. van Hengel, who was the first to photograph the species alive.

Together with Arthur Rachow and Maximilian Holly, Meinken published the loose-leaf collection Die Aquarienfische in Wort und Bild ("The Aquarium Fishes in Word and Picture") between 1934 and 1967. The work became a standard reference in German-language aquaristics. Its loose-leaf format, published in 130 installments, allowed for continuous updates. Among aquarists it was known as Holly–Meinken–Rachow.

On 8 November 1973, at the age of 77, Meinken received an honorary doctorate from the University of Bremen. Since he had never completed a university degree, his approximately 800 publications and a presentation before the awarding committee were accepted as equivalent to a dissertation. In November 1974, he formally received a doctorate (Dr. rer. nat.) from the University of Bremen.

Meinken was a long-time member of the Association of German Aquarium and Terrarium Societies (V.D.A.) and served as a systematist. From 1949 until 1976, he was head of the fish identification office of the V.D.A.

In 1975, he was diagnosed with the neurological disease myasthenia gravis. He was married and had two sons.

== Eponyms ==
Several fish species were named after Meinken:

- Rasbora meinkeni
- Apistogramma meinkeni
- Copella meinkeni (now considered a junior synonym of Copella nattereri)

== Selected works ==
- Die Aquarienfische in Wort und Bild (with Maximilian Holly and Arthur Rachow), 1934–1967
- Prächtige neue Zierfische ("Magnificent New Ornamental Fishes"), 1950
- Wir bauen unser Aquarium auf ("We Build Our Aquarium"), 1950
