= Lawrence M. Page =

American ichthyologist (born 1944)

- Born: April 17, 1944 (age 82); Fairbury, Illinois
- Awards: Fellow, AAAS (2019); Fellow, AFS (2018); Fulbright Scholar (2020)

Academic background
- Education: Illinois State University (BS); University of Illinois (MS, PhD)
- Doctoral advisor: Phil Smith

Academic work
- Discipline: Ichthyology
- Institutions: University of Florida; Illinois Natural History Survey; Florida Museum of Natural History
- Main interests: Taxonomy, evolution, and ecology of freshwater fishes.
- Website: www.floridamuseum.ufl.edu/people/larry-page/

Lawrence M. Page (born April 17, 1944) is an American ichthyologist. He is a principal scientist emeritus at the Illinois Natural History Survey, an affiliate professor at the University of Florida, and the Curator of Fishes at the Florida Museum of Natural History. He also served as the project director for iDigBio from 2011 to 2019. Over the course of his career he has published over 200 papers and nine books.

== Early life and education ==
Page was born in Fairbury, Illinois and grew up in Lexington. After developing an childhood interest in identifying fish he obtained a Bachelor of Science in biology from Illinois State University in 1966. He graduated from the University of Illinois Urbana-Champaign with a Master of Science in zoology in 1968 and a Ph.D. in zoology in 1972.

== Career ==
After finishing graduate school, Page joined the Illinois Natural History Survey (INHS) to work on statewide surveys of the fish species present in Illinois. He was employeed as a fish biologist for architectural engineering firm Sargent & Lundy in 1972 and a consultant for the Missouri Botanical Garden from 1973 to 1976. He served as an associate ichthyologist at the University of Kansas from 1979 to 1995. He became a full professor at the University of Illinois in 1980.

In 1989 Page became the director of the INHS, a position he held until 1996. He became a principal scientist emeritus at the INHS in 2001. His work at the INHS cataloguing extant and extirpated fish species within Illinois resulted in the publication of An Atlas of Illinois Fishes in 2022.

In 2005 Page became the Curator of Fishes at the Florida Museum of Natural History, where he continues to work. He served as the director of iDigBio, a National Science Foundation specimen curation project, from 2011 to 2019.

== Awards and recognition ==
- Fellow, American Association for the Advancement of Science (2019)
- Fellow, American Fisheries Society (2018)
- Fulbright award for the study of freshwater fish in Thailand (2020)
- Robert K. Johnson Award, American Society of Ichthyologists and Herpetologists (2014)
- Gibbs Award, American Society of Ichthyologists and Herpetologists

== Bibliography ==
- Page, Lawrence (1 January 1983). Handbook of Darters. TFH Publications. ISBN 978-0876668047.
- Lindquist, David; Page, Lawrence (30 September 1984). Environmental biology of darters. Developments in Environmental Biology of Fishes. Springer. ISBN 978-9061935063.
- Page, Lawrence (30 September 1985). The Crayfishes and Shrimps (Decapoda) of Illinois. Illinois Natural History Survey Bulletin. doi:10.21900/j.inhs.v33.140.
- Lawrence, Page; Burr, Brooks (1 January 1991). A Field Guide to Freshwater Fishes: North America, North of Mexico. Houghton Mifflin Harcourt. ISBN 978-0395910917.
- Lawrence, Page; Burr, Brooks (21 April 2011). Peterson Field Guide to Freshwater Fishes, Second Edition. Mariner Books. ISBN 978-0547242064.
- Page, Lawrence; Espinosa-Pérez, Héctor; Findley, Lloyd; Gilbert, Carter; Lea, Robert; Mandrak, Nicholas; Mayden, Richard; Nelson, Joseph (April 2013). Common and Scientific Names of Fishes from the United States, Canada, and Mexico, 7th edition. American Fisheries Society. ISBN 978-1-934874-31-8.
- Robins, Robert; Page, Lawrence; Williams, James; Randall, Zachary; Sheehy, Griffin (10 April 2018). Fishes in the Fresh Waters of Florida. University of Florida Press. ISBN 978-1683400332.
- Metzke, Brian; Burr, Brooks; Hinz, Leon; Page, Lawrence; Taylor, Christopher (7 June 2022). An Atlas of Illinois Fishes: 150 Years of Change. University of Illinois Press. ISBN 978-0252044144.
- Page, Lawrence; Bemis, Katherine; Dowling, Thomas; Espinosa-Pérez, Héctor; Findley, Lloyd; Gilbert, Carter; Hartel, Karsten; Lea, Robert; Mandrak, Nicholas; Neighbors, Margaret; Schmitter-Soto, Juan; Walker, H. J. (September 2023). Common and Scientific Names of Fishes from the United States, Canada, and Mexico, 8th edition. American Fisheries Society. ISBN 978-1-934874-69-1.

== Taxon described by him ==
- See Category:Taxa named by Lawrence M. Page

== Taxon named in his honor ==
- Hypostomus pagei is a species of catfish in the family Loricariidae. It is native to South America, where it occurs in the basins of the Aroa River, the Tocuyo River, and the Yaracuy River in Venezuela, although it has also been reported from Suriname.
