= Triplophysa niulanjiangensis =

Scientific classification
- Kingdom: Animalia
- Phylum: Chordata
- Class: Actinopterygii
- Order: Cypriniformes
- Family: Nemacheilidae
- Genus: Triplophysa
- Species: T. niulanjiangensis

Binomial name
- Triplophysa niulanjiangensis (L. Chen, Zong-Min Lu & W. N. Mao, 2006)

Synonyms
- Claea niulanjiangensis Chen, Lu & Mao, 2006

Species of fish

Triplophysa niulanjiangensis is a species of ray-finned fish, a stone loach, in the genus Schistura from the Yangtze drainage in Yunnan. It has been placed in the genus Claea by some authorities but this genus is listed as monotypic in Fishbase.
