= Smithstura poculi =

Conservation status
- Least Concern (IUCN 3.1)

Scientific classification
- Kingdom: Animalia
- Phylum: Chordata
- Class: Actinopterygii
- Division: Teleostei
- Order: Cypriniformes
- Family: Nemacheilidae
- Genus: Smithstura
- Species: S. poculi

Binomial name
- Smithstura poculi (H. M. Smith, 1945)

Synonyms
- Noemacheilus poculi H. M. Smith, 1945; Nemacheilus poculi (H. M. Smith, 1945); Schistura poculi (H. M. Smith, 1945)

Species of fish

Smithstura poculi is a species of stone loach in the genus Schistura. This species is currently thought to occur in the basins of the Mekong, Salween and Chao Praya rivers in Myanmar, Thailand and Laos. However, these may refer to more than one species, in which case the name S. poculi belongs to the population in the Chao Praya. It can be found in streams with moderately fast to fast currents among riffles where there are substrates which vary from gravel to stone. The specific name poculi means "bowl" and refers to the type locality, Doi Angkon in Thailand with angkon meaning "crow's bowl".
