= Tuberoschistura baenzigeri =

Conservation status
- Least Concern (IUCN 3.1)

Scientific classification
- Kingdom: Animalia
- Phylum: Chordata
- Class: Actinopterygii
- Order: Cypriniformes
- Family: Nemacheilidae
- Genus: Tuberoschistura
- Species: T. baenzigeri

Binomial name
- Tuberoschistura baenzigeri (Kottelat, 1983)

Synonyms
- Noemacheilus baenzigeri Kottelat, 1983

Species of fish

Tuberoschistura baenzigeri is a species of freshwater fish, a stone loach, found in streams in Thailand and the Malay Peninsula. It lives in the Ping River, Chao Phraya River, and Mae Klong River drainages. It lives in streams of moderate current over sand substrates. The specific name honours the Swiss entomologist Hans Bänziger for the assistance he gave Maurice Kottelat while collecting around Chiang Mai.
