= Rectoris longibarbus =

Conservation status
- Critically Endangered (IUCN 3.1)

Scientific classification
- Kingdom: Animalia
- Phylum: Chordata
- Class: Actinopterygii
- Order: Cypriniformes
- Family: Cyprinidae
- Genus: Rectoris
- Species: R. longibarbus

Binomial name
- Rectoris longibarbus D. G. Zhu, E. Zhang & J. H. Lan, 2012

Species of fish

Rectoris longibarbus is a species of freshwater ray-finned fish belonging to the family Cyprinidae, the family which includes the carps, barbs. minnows and related fishes. This species is known only from its type locality, a temporary spring emerging from a karst formation which dries up outside of the rainy season in Jingxi County, Guangxi. Rectoris posehensis, Paranemachilus jinxiensis, Prolixicheilus longisulcus and Cophecheilus bamen were also found in the spring. The area around the spring has been subjected to earthquakes and has been heavily mined, surveys conducted for this species at its type locality have not found any more. The International Union for Conservation of Nature has classified it as Critically Endangered.
