= Smithstura paucicincta =

Conservation status
- Data Deficient (IUCN 3.1)

Scientific classification
- Kingdom: Animalia
- Phylum: Chordata
- Class: Actinopterygii
- Division: Teleostei
- Order: Cypriniformes
- Family: Nemacheilidae
- Genus: Smithstura
- Species: S. paucicincta

Binomial name
- Smithstura paucicincta (Kottelat, 1990)

Synonyms
- Scistura paucicincta Kottelat, 1990

Species of fish

Smithstura paucicincta is a species of freshwater ray-finned fish belonging to the family Nemacheilidae, the stone loaches. It is only known from the Mae Nam Noi drainage, a tributary of the Salween River which forms the border between Thailand and Myanmar. This species inhabits streams with a moderate to fast current, in riffles, over beds varying from gravel to stone but it has also been recorded in small forest streams in very shallow water. This species reaches a maximum length of 5 cm (2.0 in).
