= Smithstura longa =

Scientific classification
- Kingdom: Animalia
- Phylum: Chordata
- Class: Actinopterygii
- Division: Teleostei
- Order: Cypriniformes
- Family: Nemacheilidae
- Genus: Smithstura
- Species: S. longa

Binomial name
- Smithstura longa (S. Q. Zhu, 1982)

Synonyms
- Nemacheilus longus S.-Q. Zhu, 1982; Schistura longa (S.-Q. Zhu, 1982)

Species of fish

Smithstura longa is a species of freshwater ray-finned fish belonging to the family Nemacheilidae, the stone loaches. This fish is found in Yunnan. This species is the type species of the genus Smithstura, proposed by Marco Endruweit in 2025.
