= Iskandaria pardalis =

Conservation status
- Least Concern (IUCN 3.1)

Scientific classification
- Kingdom: Animalia
- Phylum: Chordata
- Class: Actinopterygii
- Order: Cypriniformes
- Family: Nemacheilidae
- Genus: Iskandaria
- Species: I. pardalis

Binomial name
- Iskandaria pardalis (Turdakov, 1941)

Synonyms
- Nemacheilus pardalis Turdakov, 1941

Species of fish

Iskandaria pardalis, the Tadzhik loach, is a species of freshwater ray-finned fish belonging to the family Nemacheilidae, the stone loaches. This species is found in the upper Amu Darya river system in Tajikistan and Uzbekistan, and possibly in Afghanistan.
