= Chao Phraya River =

Major river in Thailand

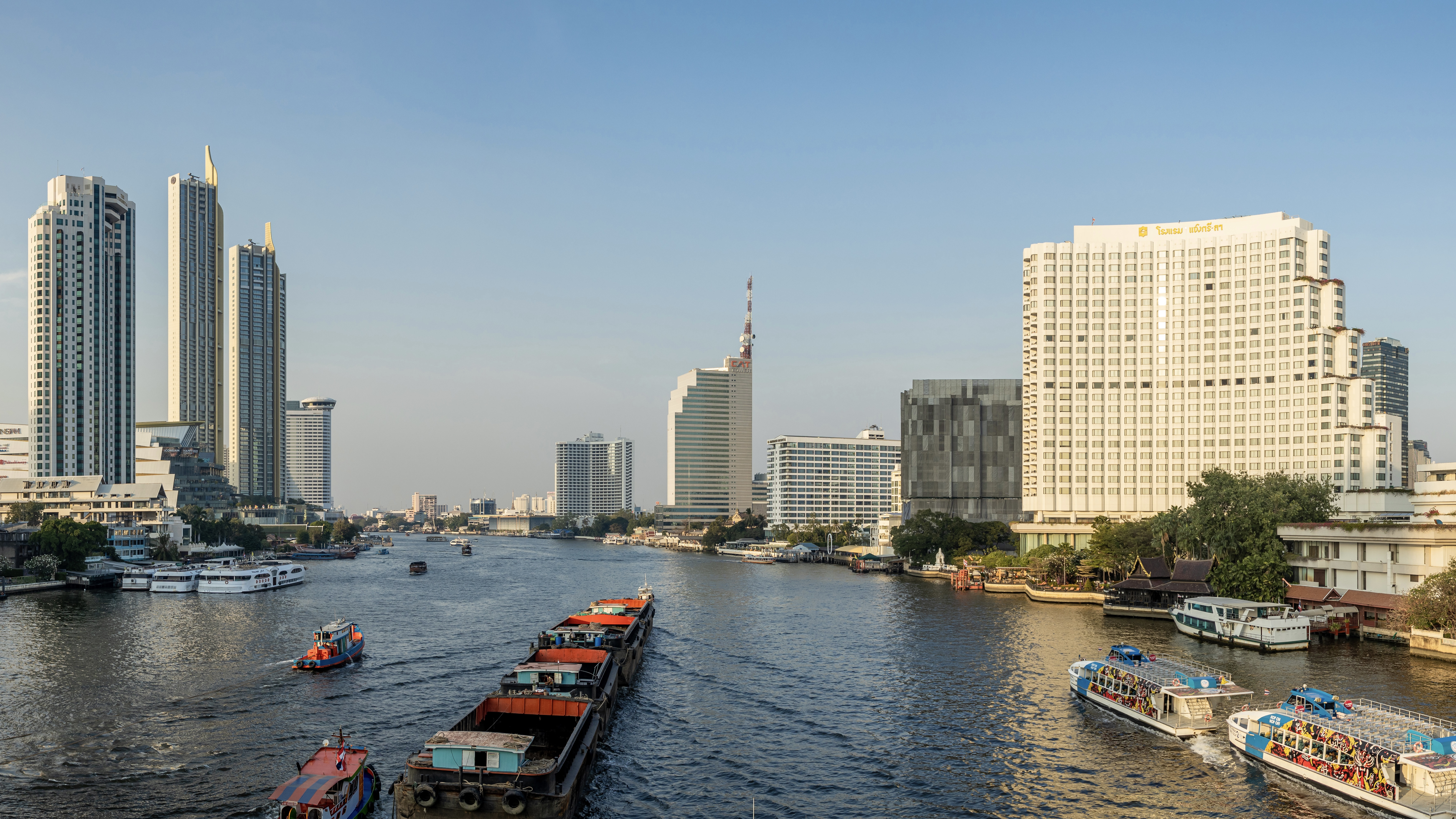
- The Chao Phraya River in Bangkok

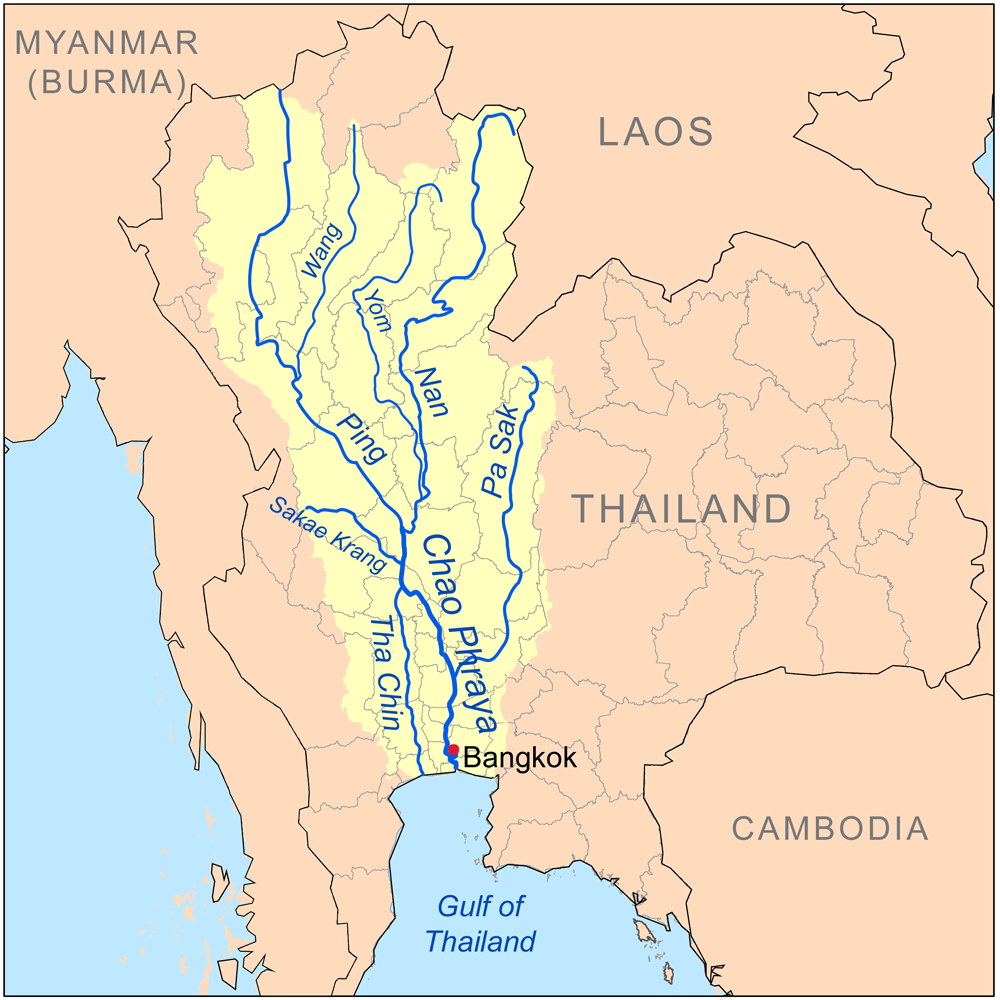
- Map of the Chao Phraya River drainage basin
- Native name: แม่น้ำเจ้าพระยา (Thai)

Location
- Country: Thailand
- City: Bangkok

Physical characteristics
- Source: Ping River
  - location: Doi Thuai, Chiang Mai
  - coordinates: 19°48′45″N 98°50′20″E
  - elevation: 1,700 m (5,600 ft)
- 2nd source: Nan River
  - location: Bo Kluea, Nan
  - coordinates: 19°20′0″N 101°12′0″E
  - elevation: 1,240 m (4,070 ft)
- Source confluence
  - location: Pak Nam Pho, Nakhon Sawan
  - coordinates: 15°42′04″N 100°08′31″E
  - elevation: 25 m (82 ft)
- Mouth: Gulf of Thailand
  - location: Thai Ban, Samut Prakan
  - coordinates: 13°31′12″N 100°36′11″E
  - elevation: 0 m (0 ft)
- Length: 372 km (231 mi)
- Basin size: 160,400 km^{2} (61,900 sq mi)
- Discharge
  - location: Nakhon Sawan
  - average: 718 m^{3}/s (25,400 cu ft/s)
  - maximum: 5,960 m^{3}/s (210,000 cu ft/s)

Basin features
- Tributaries
  - left: Pa Sak River
  - right: Sakae Krang River

The Chao Phraya River (Note: /ˌtʃaʊ prəˈjɑː/ or /tʃaʊˈpraɪə/; Thai: แม่น้ำเจ้าพระยา, RTGS: Maenam Chao Phraya, pronounced [mɛ̂ː.náːm tɕâːw pʰráʔ.jāː] or [tɕâːw pʰrā.jāː])) (Thai: แม่น้ำเจ้าพระยา) is the major river in Thailand, with its low alluvial plain forming the centre of the country. It flows through Bangkok and then into the Gulf of Thailand.

== Etymology ==
Written evidence of the river being referred to by the name Chao Phraya dates to 19th century reign of King Mongkut. It is unknown what name was used for the river in older times. The river was likely known simply by the Thai word for 'river', แม่น้ำ (RTGS: mae-nam), and foreign documents and maps, especially by Europeans visiting during the Ayutthaya period, usually named the river the Menam. (Note: Irish surveyor and cartographer James McCarthy, F.R.G.S., who served as Director-General of the Siamese Government Surveys prior to establishment of the Royal Thai Survey Department, wrote in his account, "Me Nam is a generic term, Me signifying "mother," and Nam "water," and the epithet Chao P'ia signifies that it is the chief river in the kingdom of Siam." Herbert Warington Smyth, who served as Director of the Department of Mines in Siam from 1891 to 1896, refers to it in his book first published in 1898 as "the Mae Nam Chao Phraya".)

The name Chao Phraya likely comes from Bang Chao Phraya (บางเจ้าพระยา), an alternative name, documented from around 1660 in the reign of King Narai, of the settlement that is now Samut Prakan. Historian Praphat Chuvichean suggests that the name, which is a title of nobility, originated from the story of two Khmer idols being unearthed in 1498 at the settlement that was by the mouth of the river at the time. When the delta extended further into the sea, a new settlement was founded to guard the new river mouth, and the new settlement probably gained the name Bang Chao Phraya (bang being a common term for village names) as a reference to the memory of the idols. There are references in records from the time of King Borommakot to Pak Nam Bang Chao Phraya (ปากน้ำบางเจ้าพระยา, pak nam meaning 'river mouth'), suggesting that the name had become attached to the mouth of the river by that time, and later became used for the entire river.

In the English-language media in Thailand, the name is often translated as river of kings.

== History ==
On the basins of Chao Phraya River rose the earliest civilizations in Southeast Asia, most notably the ancient kingdom of Mon-Tai and the civilization of Dvaravati from the 7th century to the 11th century. The river played a crucial role in the Lavo kingdom that existed on its left bank in the upper Chao Phraya valley and then maintained its role in the kingdoms that succeeded the Lavo kingdom. It formed the basis of the Ayodhya Kingdom, which was later incorporated into the Ayutthaya Kingdom in the 14th century, which was the precursor of modern Thailand. The river became significant after the establishment of Rattanakosin (Bangkok) in 1782 on its east bank, its location ensuring protection from Burmese invasions coming from the west.

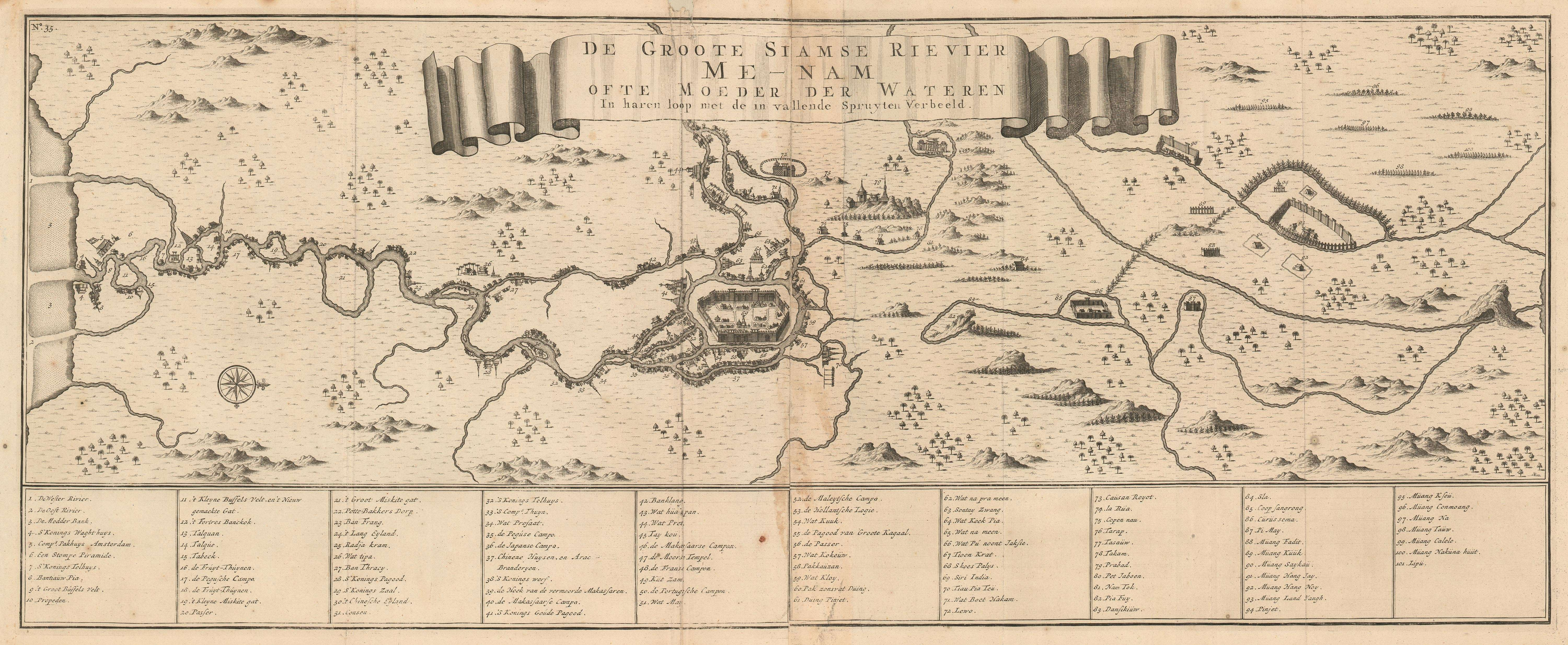
Chao Phraya River in Siam (Ayutthaya) Map by Valentijn 1726

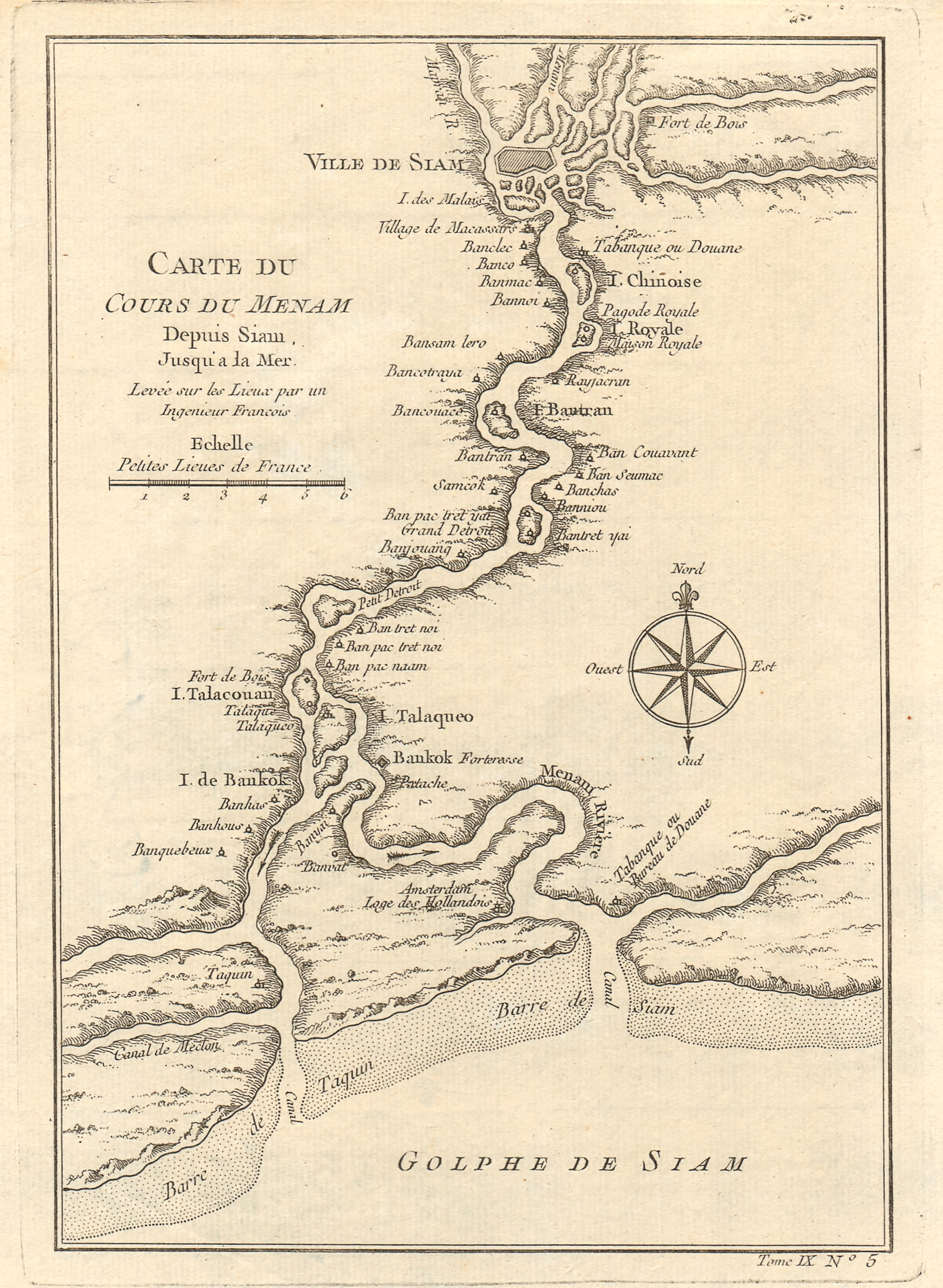
Chao Phraya River map from Ayutthaya in 1751

== Geography ==
The Chao Phraya begins at the confluence of the Ping and Nan rivers at Nakhon Sawan, Nakhon Sawan province. It flows south for 372 kilometres (231 mi) from the central plains to Bangkok and the Gulf of Thailand. In Chai Nat, the river splits into the main course and the Tha Chin River, which then flows parallel to the main river and exits in the Gulf of Thailand about 35 kilometres (22 mi) west of Bangkok in Samut Sakhon.

In the low alluvial plain which begins below the Chao Phraya Dam, there are many small canals (khlong) that split off from the main river. The khlongs are used for the irrigation of the region's rice paddies.

The area has a wet monsoon climate, with over 1,400 millimetres (55 in) of rainfall per year. Temperatures range from 24 to 33 °C (75 to 91 °F) in Bangkok.

=== River engineering ===
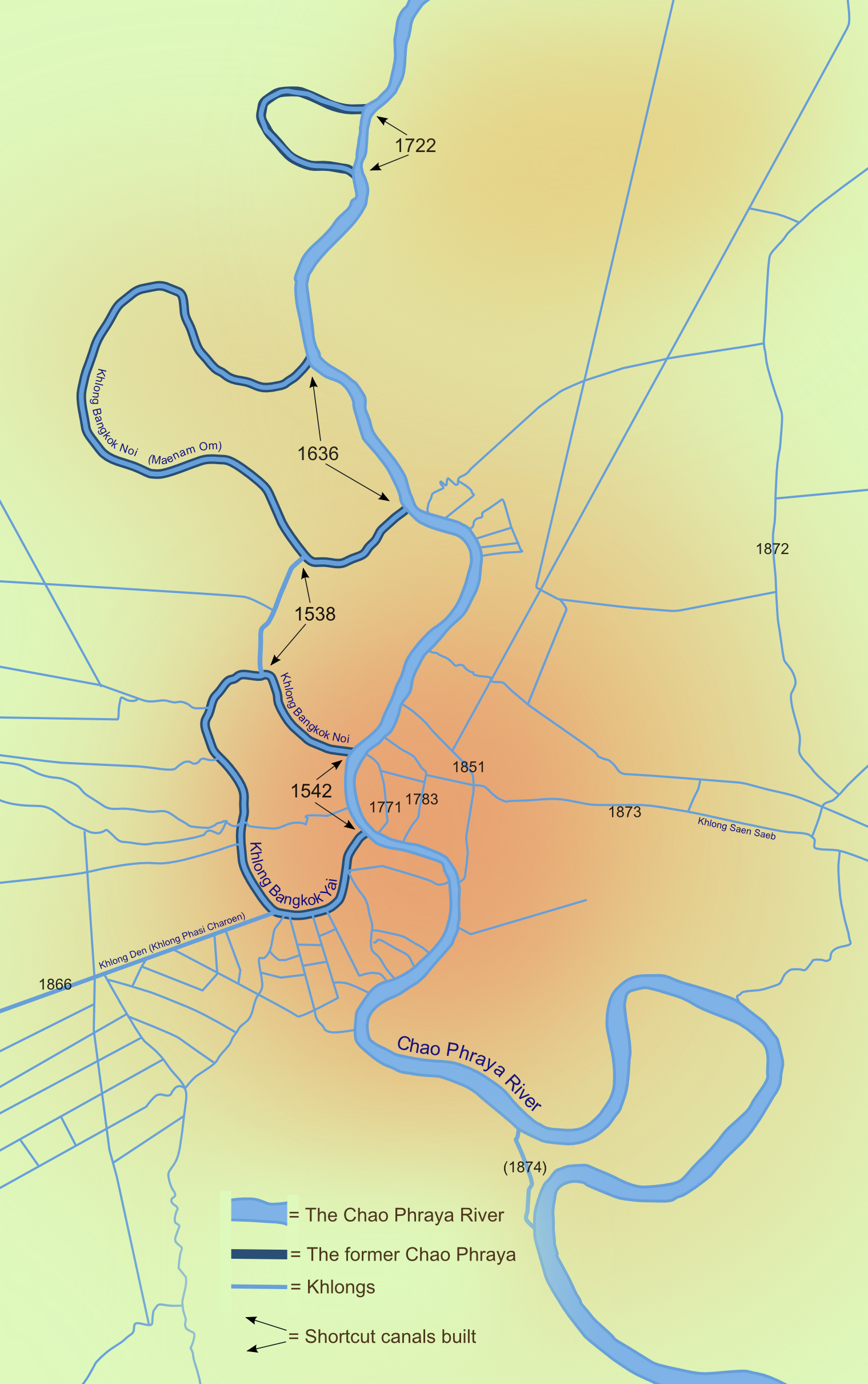
The original course of the river and its shortcut canals

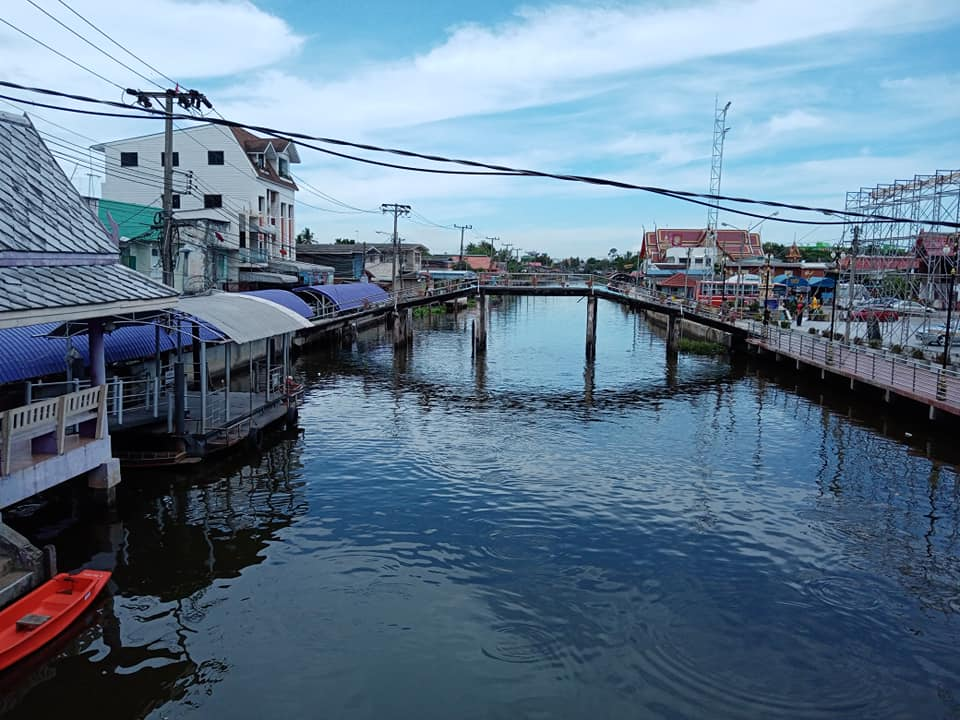
Khlong Bangkok Noi in Nonthaburi province

The lower Chao Phraya underwent several human-made modifications during the Ayutthaya period. Several shortcut canals were constructed to bypass large loops in the river, shortening the trip from the capital city to the sea. The course of the river has since changed to follow many of these canals.

- In 1538, Thailand's first river engineering of a 3 km (2 mi) long canal was dug at the order of King Chairachathirat. It was called "Khlong Lat", and today forms a part of Khlong Bangkok Noi. It shortened the route by 13–14 km for ships from the Gulf of Siam to the capital city Ayutthaya.
- In 1542, a two-kilometer-long canal, "Khlong Lat Bangkok", was completed. The Chao Phraya then diverted along the canal, its old course becoming part of Khlong Bangkok Noi and Khlong Bangkok Yai. It is said to have shortened the river route by 14 km (9 mi).
- In 1608, a seven-kilometer-long "Khlong Bang Phrao" canal was completed and has shortened the Chao Phraya's original route by 18 km (11 mi).
- In 1636, the "Khlong Lat Mueang Nonthaburi" was completed.
- In 1722, the two-kilometre long "Khlong Lat Kret Noi" shortened the Chao Phraya by 7 km (4 mi). This route formed the island of Ko Kret.
- In 2024 the 22-km-long "Chao Phraya II" channel was under construction. It will join the river at points to the north and south of Ayutthaya, providing flood relief for the city.

== River settlements ==
Provinces along the Chao Phraya include, from north to south, Nakhon Sawan Province, Uthai Thani Province, Chai Nat Province, Sing Buri Province, Ang Thong Province, Ayutthaya Province, Pathum Thani Province, Nonthaburi Province, Bangkok, and Samut Prakan Province. These cities are among the most historically significant and densely populated settlements of Thailand due to their access to the waterway.

== Transportation ==
Chao Phraya River 2024

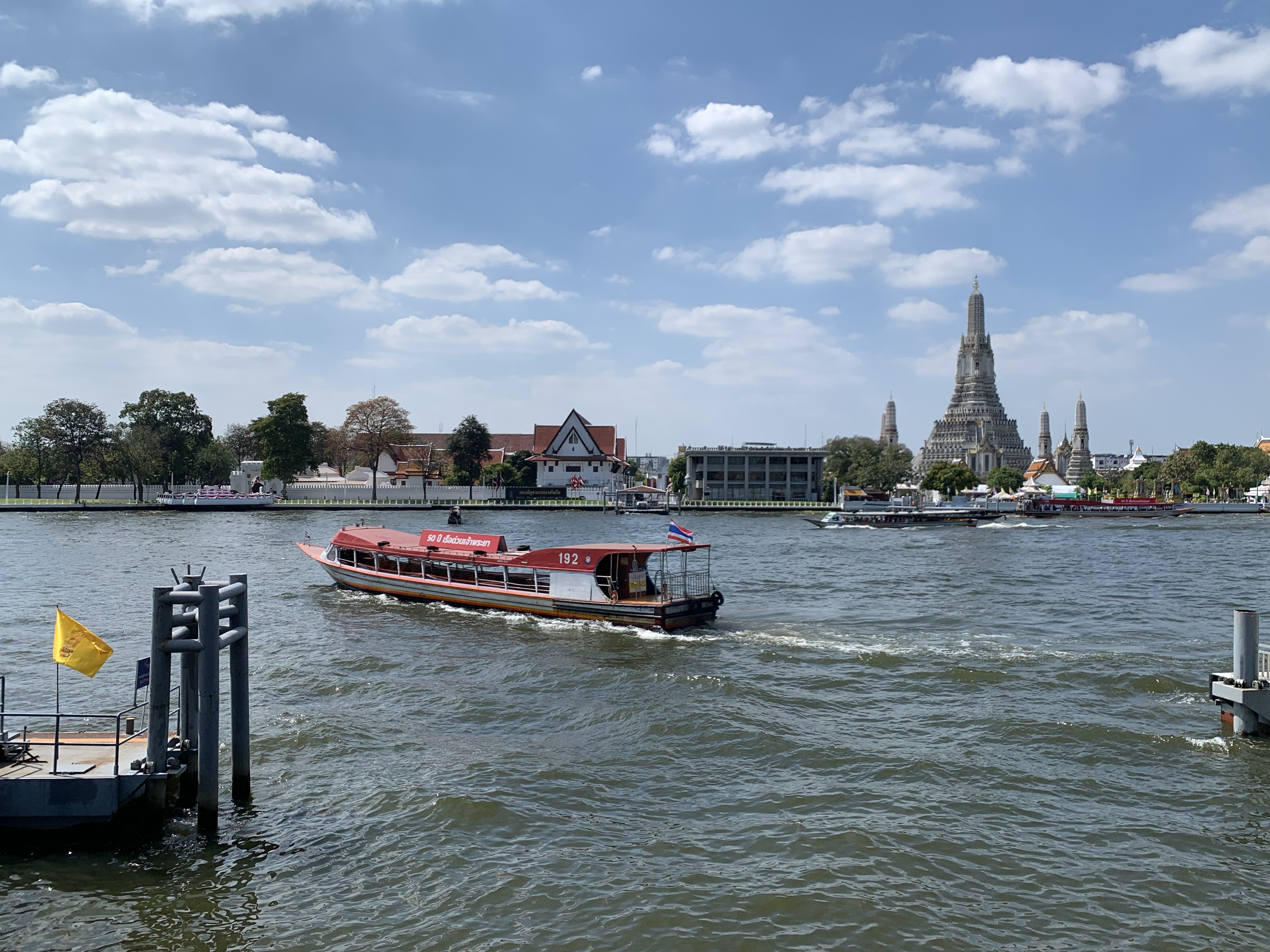
Chao Phraya Express Boat on the Chao Phraya. Wat Arun is visible in the background.

Major bridges cross the Chao Phraya in Bangkok include the Rama VI railroad bridge; Phra Pin-klao near the Grand Palace; Rama VIII, a single tower asymmetrical cable-stayed bridge; Rama IX, a semi-symmetric cable-stayed bridge; and Mega Bridge, on the Industrial Ring Road.

In Bangkok, the Chao Phraya is a major transportation artery for a network of river buses, cross-river ferries, and water taxis ("longtails"). More than 15 boat lines operate on the rivers and canals of the city, including commuter lines.

== Tributaries ==
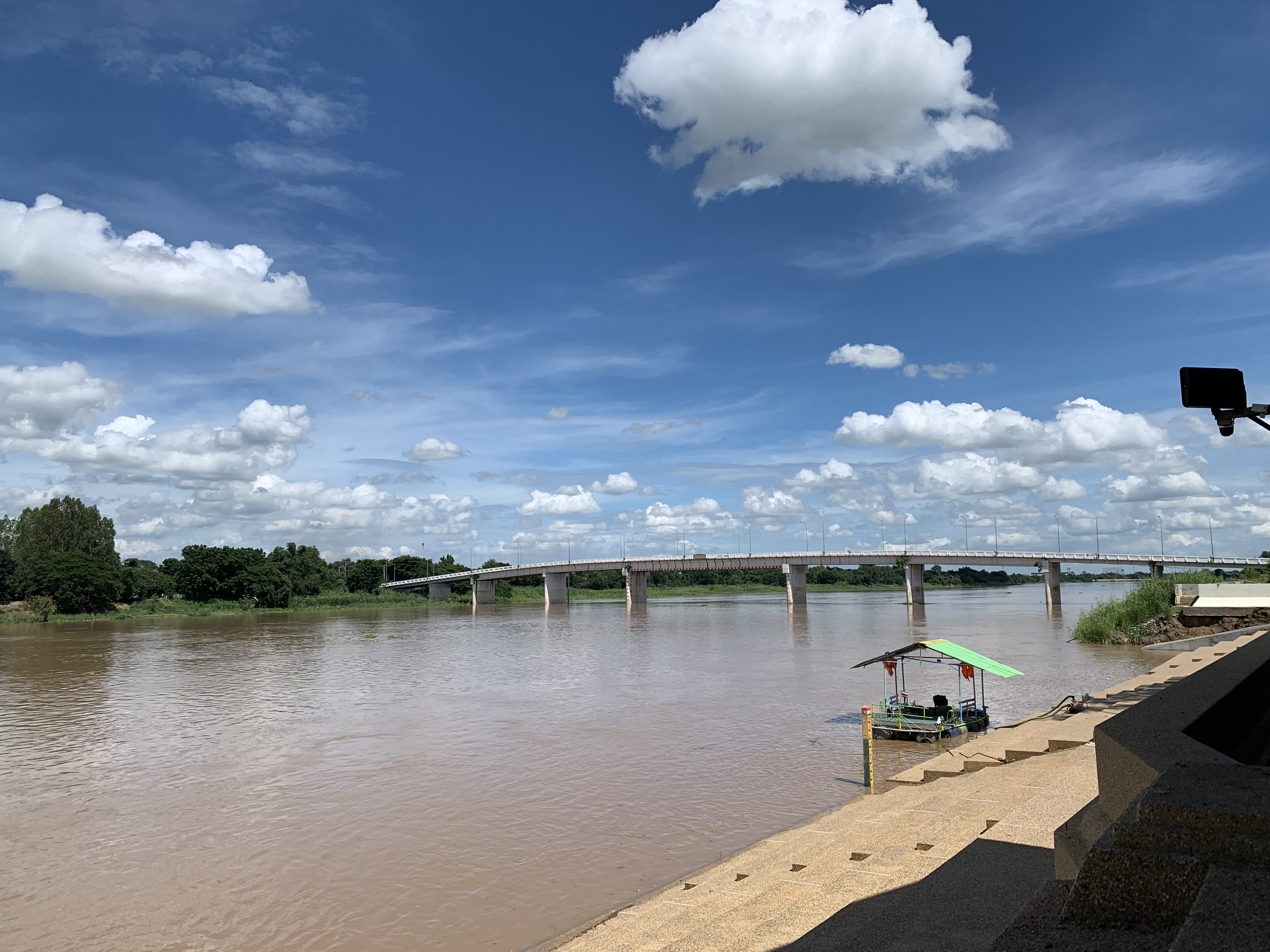
The Chao Phraya in Chaiyo District, Ang Thong Province

The principal tributaries of the Chao Phraya River are the Pa Sak River, the Sakae Krang River, the Nan River (along with its principal confluent the Yom River), the Ping River (with its principal confluent, the Wang River), and the Tha Chin River. Each of these tributaries (and the Chao Phraya itself) is augmented by minor tributaries referred to as khwae. All of the tributaries, including the lesser khwae, form an extensive tree-like pattern, with branches flowing through nearly every province in central and northern Thailand. None of the tributaries of the Chao Phraya extend beyond the nation's borders. The Nan and the Yom River flow nearly parallel from Phitsanulok to Chumsaeng in the north of Nakhon Sawan Province. The Wang River enters the Ping River near Sam Ngao district in Tak Province.

== Length ==
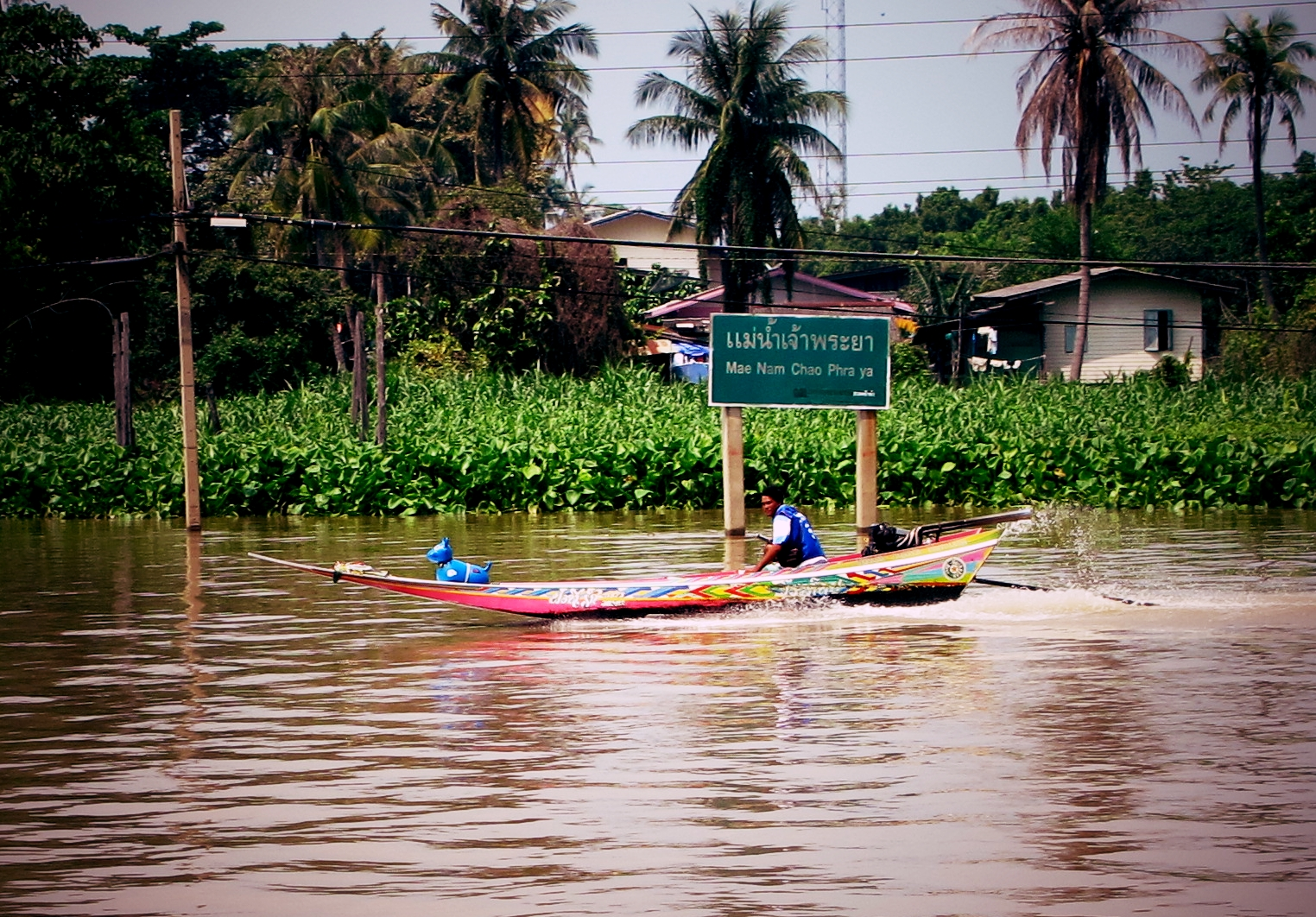
Boat on the Chao Phraya in Nonthaburi

When measured from the most commonly accepted source, which is the confluence of the Ping and Nan River in Nakhon Sawan, the river measures 372 km (231 mi). However, when measured from the longest source, which is the origin point of the Nan River in the Luang Prabang Range, the river measures 1,112 km (691 mi).

== Watershed ==
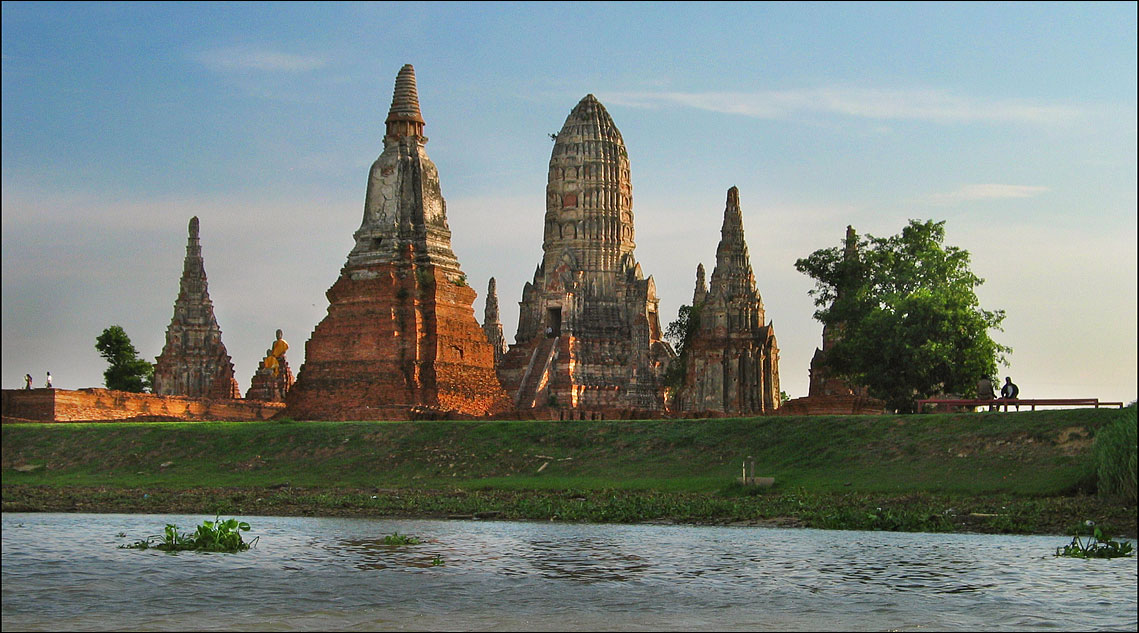
Ruins of Wat Chaiwatthanaram, built in Ayutthaya Kingdom, by the Chao Phraya

The expanse of the Chao Phraya River and its tributaries, i.e., the Chao Phraya river system, together with the land upon which falling rain drains into these bodies of water, form the Chao Phraya watershed.

The Chao Phraya watershed is the largest watershed in Thailand, covering approximately 35 percent of the nation's land, and draining an area of 157,924 square kilometres (60,975 sq mi).

The watershed is divided into the following basins:

- Pa Sak Basin
- Sakae Krang Basin
- Greater Nan Basin (composed of the Nan Basin and the Yom Basin, and usually divided as such in drainage analyses)
- Greater Ping Basin (composed of the Ping Basin and the Wang Basin, and usually divided as such in drainage analyses)
- Tha Chin Basin (the basin of the Chao Phraya's most significant distributaries)
- Finally the Chao Phraya Basin itself is defined as the portion of the Chao Phraya watershed drained by the Chao Phraya River itself, and not by its major tributaries or distributaries. As such, the Chao Phraya Basin drains 20,126 square kilometres (7,771 sq mi) of land.

To the west, the central plain of Thailand is drained by the Mae Klong and the east by the Bang Pakong River. They are not part of the Chao Praya system.

The landscape of the river basins is a very wide, flat, well-watered plain continuously refreshed with soil and sediment brought down by the rivers. The lower central plain from the delta north to Ang Thong Province is a flat, low area with an average of two metres above sea level. Further north and into the plains of the Ping and the Nan the elevation is over 20 m. Then the mountains that are the natural boundary of the Chao Praya watershed form a divide, which has, to some degree, historically isolated Thailand from other Southeast Asian civilisations. In northern Thailand, the divide roughly corresponds to a long section of the political border of the country today. Southern portions of the divide's boundary correspond less to the nation's political border because isolation in this area was prevented by the ease of transportation along the lowlands surrounding the Gulf of Thailand, allowing a unified Thai civilisation to extend beyond the watershed without issue. The slightly higher northern plains have been farmed for centuries and saw a major change from the 13th century during the Sukhothai Kingdom in the 13th and 14th centuries and the Ayutthaya Kingdom that succeeded it when rice growing intensified with the introduction of floating rice, a much faster-growing strain of rice from Bengal. The southern swamps meanwhile changed radically from the 18th century when King Buddha Yodfa Chulaloke moved the capital of Siam to Bangkok, and a process of canalisation and cultivation began, especially as Thailand began to export rice from 1855.

As noted by Chris Baker and Pasuk Phongpaichit, the Chaophraya Plain falls only about 80 metres over the 500 kilometres from the hills to the sea, so the rivers run sluggishly and craft could be poled or paddled northward for most of the year, which made water the most convenient medium of transport before the modern era. They give the catchment as 162,000 square kilometres and the rainfall on it as about 1,300 millimetres between May and October, and read the combination of hill boundaries and water communications as the reason the territory developed as a distinct cultural zone.

== Delta ==
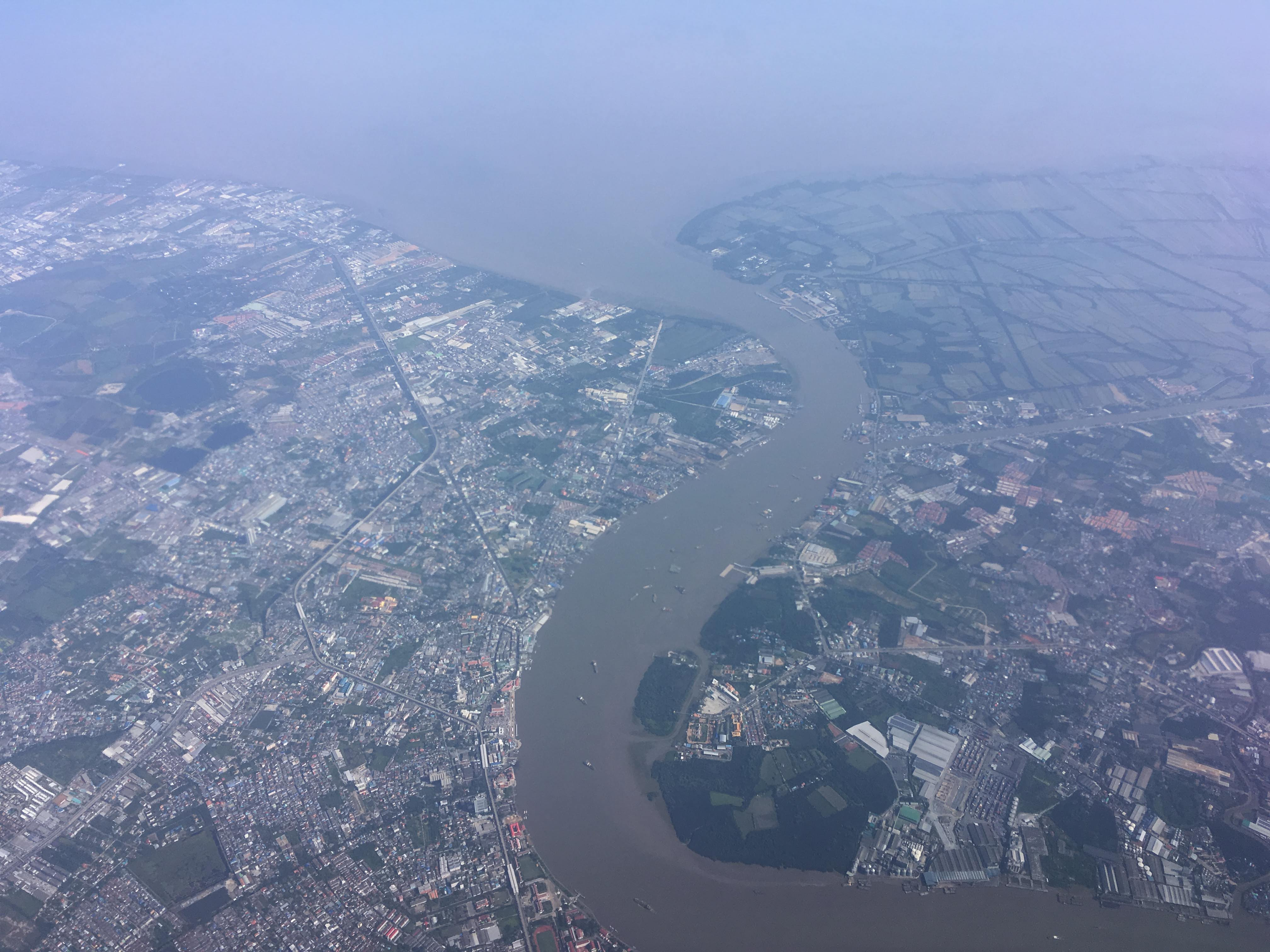
The mouth of Chao Phraya River

The Tha Chin River is the major distributary of the Chao Phraya River. The expanse of the Chao Phraya and Tha Chin Rivers and their distributaries, starting at the point at which the distributaries diverge, together with the land amid the triangle formed by the outermost and innermost distributary, form the Chao Phraya Delta. The many distributaries of the Chao Phraya delta are interconnected by canals that serve both for irrigation and transportation.

The delta took its present form late. Around 17,000 years ago the sea stood more than 100 metres below its present level; it rose to a maximum of about 4 metres above that level around 6550 BCE, submerging the lower plain, then fell, the coastline reaching the site of Bangkok between 3000 and 1000 BCE and settling near its present position by 500 CE. Baker and Pasuk report that recent research has the sea receding earlier than once thought, which revises the long-held view that the lower gulf lay under water through the first millennium and that many Dvaravati sites then stood on the coast.

== Ecology ==
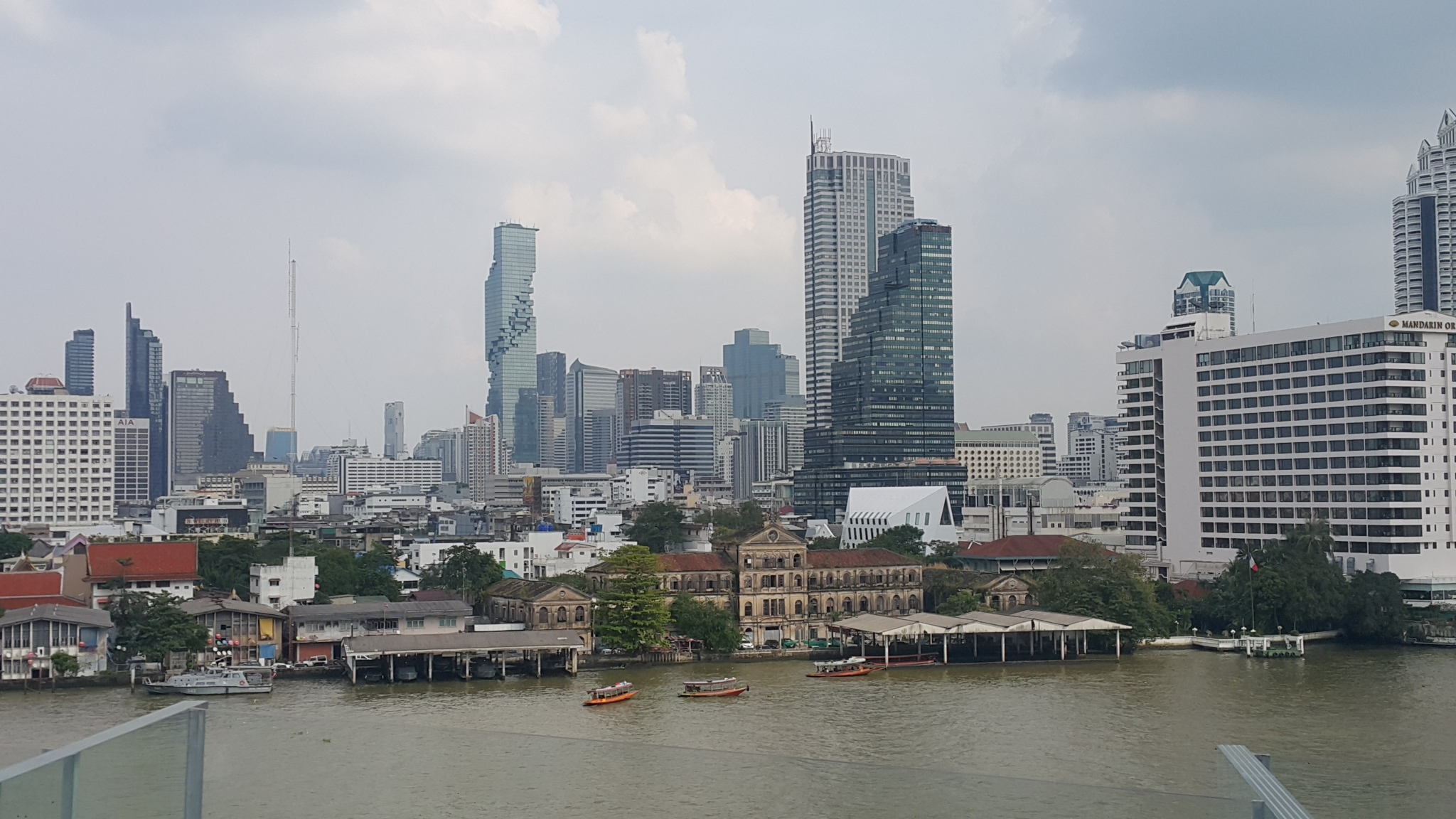
Human settlements along the Chao Phraya in Bang Rak, Bangkok

The lowland areas of the Chao Phraya watershed in central Thailand have been designated as the Chao Phraya freshwater swamp forests, a tropical and subtropical moist broadleaf forests ecoregion, an area about 400 km (249 mi) north to south and 180 km (112 mi) wide.

The original swamp forests have almost entirely been removed as the plain has been converted to rice paddies, other agriculture, and urban areas like Bangkok. Much of the wildlife that once inhabited these plains has disappeared, including a large number of fish in the river systems, birds such as vultures, the Oriental darter (Anhinga melanogaster), white-eyed river martin (Pseudochelidon sirintarae), the sarus crane (Grus antigone) and animals such as tigers, Asian elephants, Javan rhinoceroses, and the much-hunted Schomburgk's deer. Today we can only guess at the original habitat and wildlife by comparing it with neighbouring countries. It is believed that the area would have consisted of freshwater swamps inland and salty mangroves on the coast and river estuaries. The swamp would have been covered in Phragmites marsh grasses. Today there is a small area of this remaining in Khao Sam Roi Yot National Park, a relic of the original landscape.

As so much has been cleared or altered the potential for creating large protected areas to preserve original habitat no longer exists. However much wildlife does remain in the rice fields and steps may be taken to preserve these as urban and industrial development on the plains is ongoing and the Industrial Estate Authority of Thailand has very little control or planning over this. Particular threats come from the conversion of rice paddies to large-scale production of prawns by pumping in seawater, and the use of pesticides to eliminate the introduced snail,Pomacea canaliculata, which damages rice plants.

There are populations of threatened birds, including colonies of breeding water birds such as the world's largest populations of the near-threatened Asian openbill (Anastomus oscitans), and other birds such as the wintering black kite (Milvus migrans). Endemic mammals that remain are the limestone rat (Niviventer hinpoon), Neill's long-tailed giant rat (Leopoldamys neilli), and the near-endemic Thailand roundleaf bat (Hipposideros halophyllus).

The Chao Phraya basin is home to about half a dozen endemic dragonflies and damselflies. The conservation status of most of these is unclear (they are rated as data deficient by the IUCN), but Cryptophaea saukra is critically endangered and Caliphaea angka is endangered.

There are a few areas of wetland protected as national parks, but these are mostly very small.

=== Fish ===
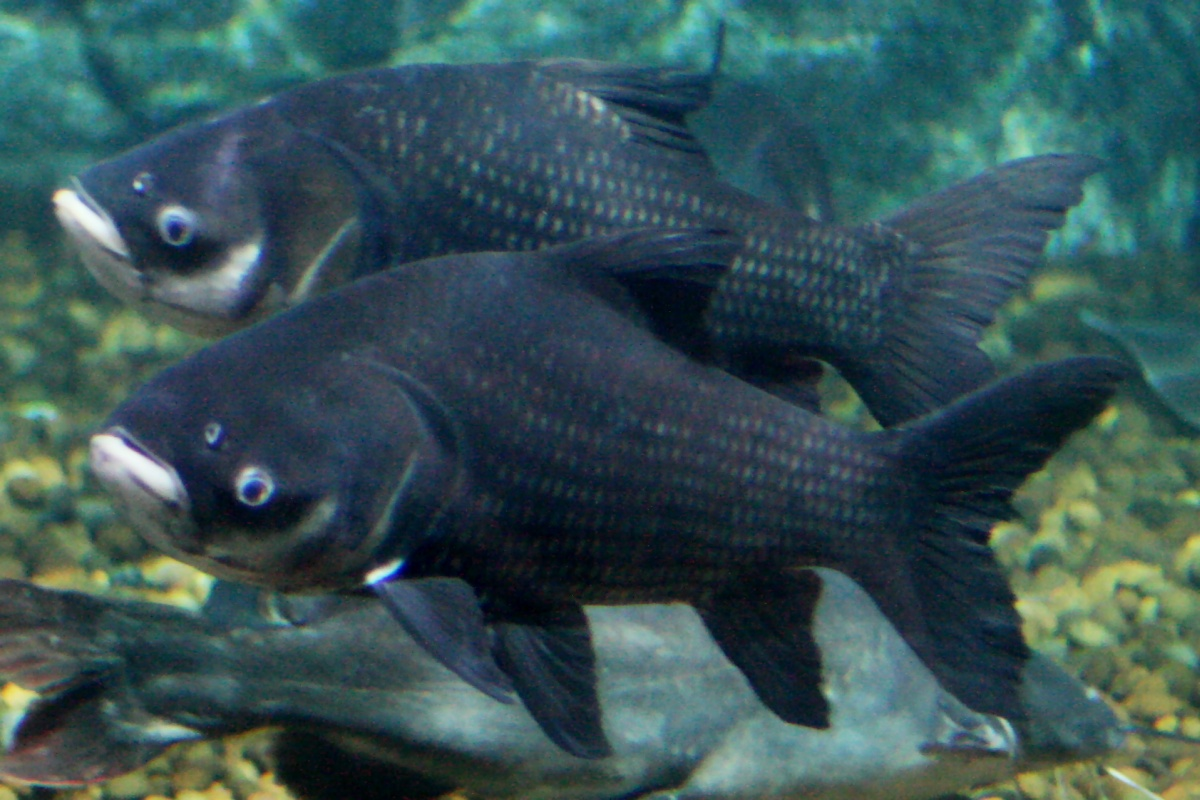
The giant barb is one of the world's largest freshwater fish weighing up to 300 kg (660 lb), but the natural population has been extirpated from Chao Phraya.

The Chao Phraya basin is home to around 280 species of fish, including about 30 endemics. By far the most diverse family is Cyprinidae with 108 species. The mainstream of the Chao Phraya River has about 190 native fish species. In general, the aquatic fauna of Chao Phraya and Mae Klong show clear similarities, and they are sometimes combined in a single ecoregion with 328 fish species. Despite their similarities, there are also differences between the aquatic fauna of Chao Phraya and Mae Klong; the latter (but not the former) is home to a few taxa otherwise only known in major Burmese rivers: the Irrawaddy, Salween, and Tenasserim. The aquatic fauna in Chao Phraya–Mae Klong also show clear similarities with that of the middle Mekong (the lower Mekong fauna more closely resembles that of the eastern Malay Peninsula). It is believed that the upper Mekong was connected to Chao Phraya (rather than the present-day lower Mekong) until the Quaternary, which explains the similarities in their river faunas. This included the Nan River basin, a tributary of the Chao Phraya, which is home to several taxa (for example, Ambastaia nigrolineata and Sectoria) otherwise only known from Mekong. Of the fish species known from the Chao Phraya–Mae Klong, only about 50 are absent from the Mekong.

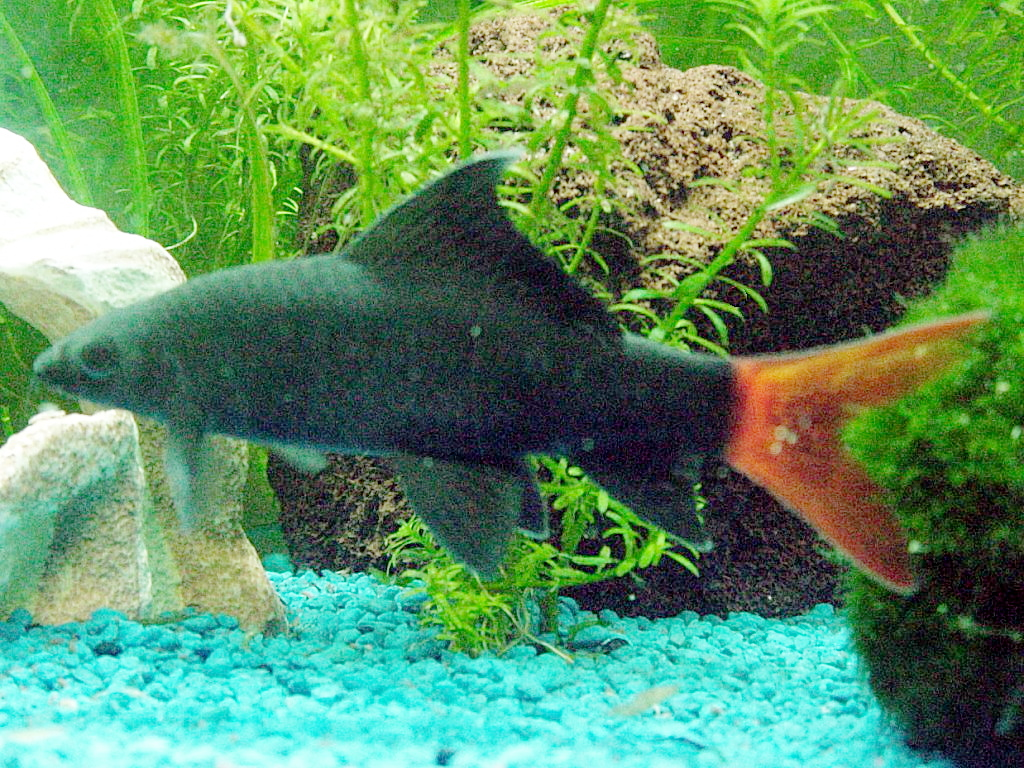
The only remaining wild population of the red-tailed black shark is restricted to an area of less than 10 km^{2} (4 mi^{2}).

There has been extensive habitat destruction (pollution, dams, and drainage for irrigation) in the Chao Phraya basin and overfishing also presents a problem. Within mainland Southeast Asia, the only freshwater region with similar high levels of threat is the lower Mekong. It has been estimated that only around 30 native fish species still can reproduce in the mainstream of the Chao Phraya River.

The catfish Platytropius siamensis is endemic to Chao Phraya and Bang Pakong, but has not been recorded since the 1970s and is considered extinct. Recent records of the near-endemic cyprinid Balantiocheilos ambusticauda are also lacking and it is possibly extinct. Three of the largest freshwater fish in the world are native to the river, but these are all seriously threatened: the critically endangered giant barb (wild populations have been extirpated from Chao Phraya, but remain elsewhere), critically endangered giant pangasius, and endangered giant freshwater stingray. The critically endangered red-tailed black shark, a small colourful cyprinid that is endemic to Chao Phraya, is commonly seen in the aquarium trade where it is bred in large numbers, but the only remaining wild population is at a single location that covers less than 10 km^{2} (4 mi^{2}). The endangered dwarf loach, another species bred in large numbers for the aquarium trade, has been extirpated from most of its range in Chao Phraya. The critically endangered Siamese tigerfish has been entirely extirpated from Chao Phraya and Mae Klong, but small populations remain in the Mekong basin.

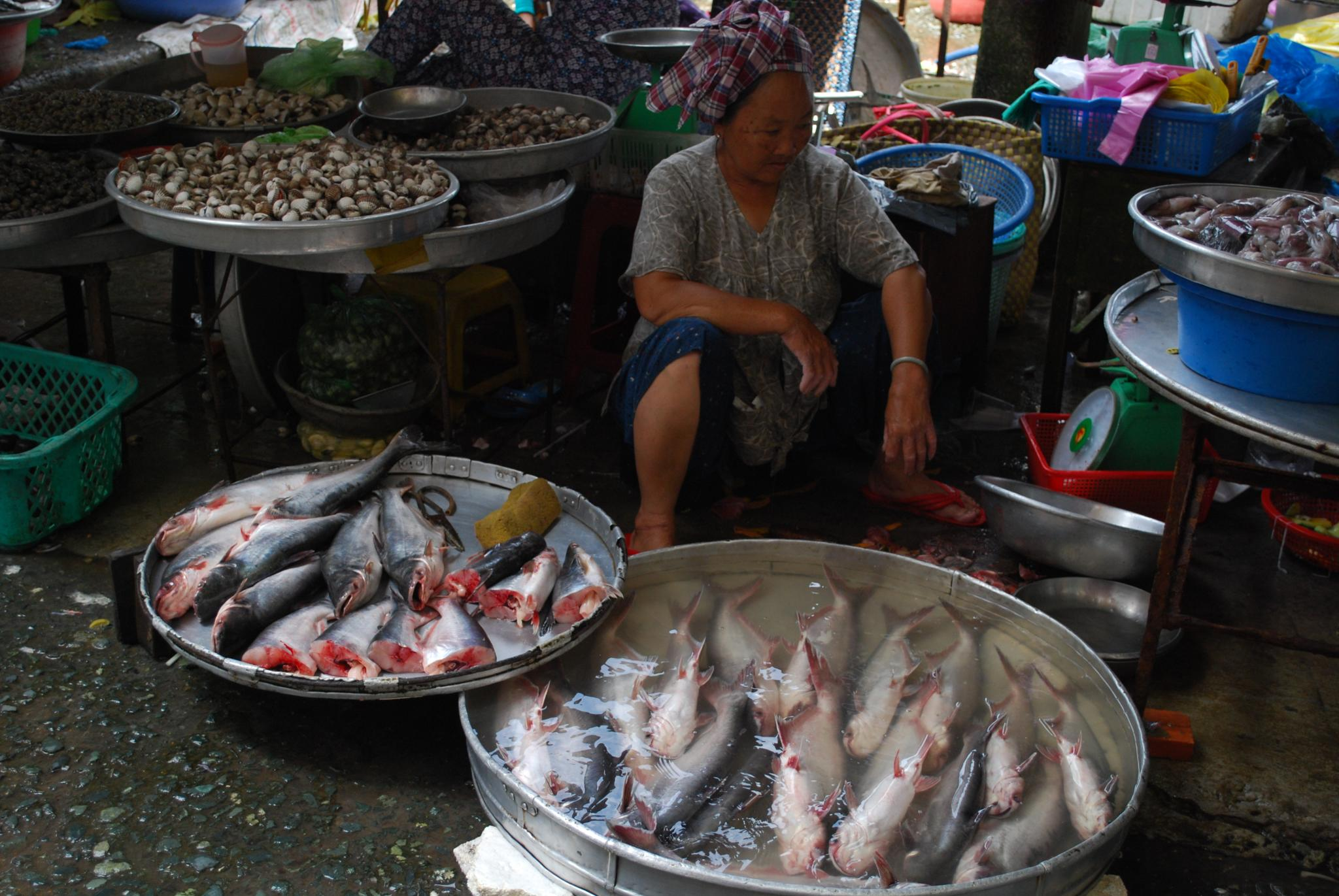
Basa fish from the Chao Phraya and Mekong is an important food fish, and it is also farmed.

Many other species that either are prominent in the aquarium trade or important food fish are native to the Chao Phraya basin, such as the climbing perch, blue panchax, Asian bumblebee catfish, giant snakehead, striped snakehead, walking catfish, banded loach, several Yasuhikotakia loaches, tinfoil barb, Siamese algae eater, silver barb, pearl danio, rainbow shark, Hampala barb, black sharkminnow, Leptobarbus rubripinna, long pectoral-fin minnow, bonylip barb, Jullien's golden carp, blackline rasbora, scissortail rasbora, Tor tambroides, finescale tigerfish, marble goby, Chinese algae eater, giant featherback, clown featherback, giant gourami, several Trichopodus gouramis, iridescent shark, several Pangasius, Belodontichthys truncatus, several Phalacronotus sheatfish, several Wallago catfish, largescale archerfish, small-scale archerfish, and wrestling halfbeak.

=== Pollution ===
The Thai Pollution Control Department (PCD) reports that the water quality of major rivers flowing into the upper Gulf of Thailand has seriously deteriorated, and the lower Chao Phraya contains bacteria and nutrient pollution from phosphates, phosphorus, and nitrogen. Nutrient pollution causes algae to grow faster than ecosystems can handle, harming water quality, food resources for aquatic animals, and marine habitats. It also decreases the oxygen that fish need to survive. PCD rated water quality at the mouth of Chao Phraya in Bangkok's Bang Khun Thian District as "very poor", worse than in 2014, and their findings indicated large amounts of wastewater were discharged into the river from households, industry, and agriculture. In addition, 4,000 metric tons of plastic flow down the river into the Gulf of Thailand every year. To counter this, Thailand's Department of Marine and Coastal Resources (DMCR) signed an agreement with The Ocean Cleanup organization to deploy an Interceptor Original, one of the organization's solar-powered, automated systems, in the river. Since 19 February 2024, an interceptor of the latest third generation has been deployed for testing purposes.

== See also ==
- River Systems of Thailand
- Kapuas River
