= Kuschakewitsch loach =

Conservation status
- Least Concern (IUCN 3.1); Iskandaria kuschakewitschi

Scientific classification
- Kingdom: Animalia
- Phylum: Chordata
- Class: Actinopterygii
- Order: Cypriniformes
- Family: Nemacheilidae
- Genus: Iskandaria
- Species: I. kuschakewitschi

Binomial name
- Iskandaria kuschakewitschi (Herzenstein, 1890)

Synonyms
- Nemacheilus kuschakewitschi Herzenstein, 1890; Noemacheilus kuschakewitschi (Herzenstein, 1890)

Species of fish

Iskandaria kuschakewitschi, the Kuschakewitsch loach, is a species of stone loach found in the Central Asian nations of Uzbekistan and Afghanistan.
