= Dalistura arenicola =

Conservation status
- Least Concern (IUCN 3.1)

Scientific classification
- Kingdom: Animalia
- Phylum: Chordata
- Class: Actinopterygii
- Division: Teleostei
- Order: Cypriniformes
- Family: Nemacheilidae
- Genus: Dalistura
- Species: D. arenicola

Binomial name
- Dalistura arenicola (Kottelat, 1998)

Synonyms
- Nemacheilus arenicolus Kottelat, 1998

Species of fish

Dalistura arenicola is a species of freshwater ray-finned fishes belonging to the family Nemacheilidae, the stone loaches. This species is found only in the Nam Theun and Nam Gnouang rivers in Laos .

== Footnotes ==
- Froese, Rainer; Pauly, Daniel (eds.). "Nemacheilus arenicolus". FishBase.
