= Rectoris longifinus =

Scientific classification
- Kingdom: Animalia
- Phylum: Chordata
- Class: Actinopterygii
- Order: Cypriniformes
- Family: Cyprinidae
- Genus: Rectoris
- Species: R. longifinus

Binomial name
- Rectoris longifinus W. X. Li, W. N. Mao & Zong-Min Lu, 2002

Species of fish

Rectoris longifinus is a species of freshwater ray-finned fish belonging to the family Cyprinidae, the family which includes the carps, barbs. minnows and related fishes. This species is endemic to Yunnan in China. This species was first formally described) in 2002 from Zhoxi in Shilin County and said to be similar to R. posehensis, however, other authors consider that this species is unlikely to be a member of the genus Rectoris and that it is generic placement awaits further study.
