= Styxichthys xichouensis =

Scientific classification
- Kingdom: Animalia
- Phylum: Chordata
- Class: Actinopterygii
- Division: Teleostei
- Order: Cypriniformes
- Family: Nemacheilidae
- Genus: Styxichthys
- Species: S. xichouensis

Binomial name
- Styxichthys xichouensis (Liu, Pan, Yang and Chen, 2017)

Synonyms
- Triplophysa xichouensis

Species of fish

Styxichthys xichouensis is a species of fish in the genus Styxichthys. It is endemic to a cave system, in the upper Red River drainage of Xichou County, Yunnan Province.
