= Smithstura greenei =

Scientific classification
- Kingdom: Animalia
- Phylum: Chordata
- Class: Actinopterygii
- Division: Teleostei
- Order: Cypriniformes
- Family: Nemacheilidae
- Genus: Smithstura
- Species: S. greenei

Binomial name
- Smithstura greenei Endruweit, 2017

Synonyms
- Schistura greenei Endruweit, 2017

Species of fish

Smithstura greenei is a species of freshwater ray-finned fish belonging to the family Nemacheilidae, the stone loaches. This fish is found in the upper Salween in Yunnan. It was described in 2017. This species reaches a standard length of 4.5 cm (1.8 in).
