= Pteronemacheilus lucidorsum =

Scientific classification
- Domain: Eukaryota
- Kingdom: Animalia
- Phylum: Chordata
- Class: Actinopterygii
- Order: Cypriniformes
- Family: Nemacheilidae
- Genus: Pteronemacheilus
- Species: P. lucidorsum

Binomial name
- Pteronemacheilus lucidorsum Bohlen & Šlechtová, 2011

Species of fish

Pteronemacheilus lucidorsum is a species of stone loach endemic to the Irrawaddy Basin, Myanmar.
