= Rhyacoschistura suber =

Conservation status
- Data Deficient (IUCN 3.1)

Scientific classification
- Domain: Eukaryota
- Kingdom: Animalia
- Phylum: Chordata
- Class: Actinopterygii
- Order: Cypriniformes
- Family: Nemacheilidae
- Genus: Rhyacoschistura
- Species: R. suber

Binomial name
- Rhyacoschistura suber (Kottelat, 2000)

Synonyms
- Schistura suber Kottelat, 2000

Species of fish

Rhyacoschistura suber is a species of ray-finned fish, a stone loach, in the genus Rhyacoschistura. This species was originally described from three specimens collected among leaf litter in very shallow water in a small forest creek in the Nam Leuk drainage basin in Laos in 1997. These specimens were revealed to be juveniles and the species was re-described in 2019 on the basis of adult specimens. Based on the re-description, the species was moved from Schistura to the newly described genus, Rhyacoschistura.
