= Vurxastroma laticeps =

Scientific classification
- Kingdom: Animalia
- Phylum: Chordata
- Class: Actinopterygii
- Division: Teleostei
- Order: Cypriniformes
- Family: Nemacheilidae
- Genus: Vurxastroma
- Species: V. laticeps

Binomial name
- Vurxastroma laticeps (W. Zhou & G. H. Cui, 1997)

Synonyms
- Triplophysa laticeps W. Zhou & G. H. Cui, 1997

Species of fish

Vurxastroma laticeps is a species of freshwater ray-finned fish belonging to the family Nemacheilidae, the stone loaches. This fish is endemic to Yunnan, China.

This species reaches a total length of 5.3 cm (2.1 in). The type locality is a small stream with a moderate to swift current and gravel substrate.
