= Vurxastroma grahami =

Conservation status
- Data Deficient (IUCN 3.1)

Scientific classification
- Kingdom: Animalia
- Phylum: Chordata
- Class: Actinopterygii
- Division: Teleostei
- Order: Cypriniformes
- Family: Nemacheilidae
- Genus: Vurxastroma
- Species: V. grahami

Binomial name
- Vurxastroma grahami (Regan, 1906)

Synonyms
- Nemachilus grahami Regan, 1906; Triplophysa grahami (Regan, 1906)

Species of fish

Vurxastroma grahami is a species of freshwater ray-finned fish belonging to the family Nemacheilidae, the stone loaches. This fish is endemic to the Jinsha River and Lishe River in Yunnan, although the population in the Lishe River may be a separate species. This species reaches a standard length of 9.1 cm (3.6 in).
