= Koima monilis =

Conservation status
- Least Concern (IUCN 3.1)

Scientific classification
- Kingdom: Animalia
- Phylum: Chordata
- Class: Actinopterygii
- Division: Teleostei
- Order: Cypriniformes
- Family: Nemacheilidae
- Genus: Koima
- Species: K. monilis

Binomial name
- Koima monilis (Hora, 1921)

Synonyms
- Nemacheilus monilis Hora, 1921

Species of fish

Koima monilis, the spotted loach, is a species of ray-finned fish in the family Nemacheilidae which is endemic to the southern Western Ghats in the Indian states of Kerala and Tamil Nadu. It occurs in fast flowing water, even in rapids, over substrates consisting of pebbles and cobbles. It occasionally is collected and exported for the aquarium trade.

The specific epithet monilis comes from the Latin monilis, meaning “necklace” or “collar,” referring to the string of black spots along the lateral line.
