= Traccatichthys zispi =

Scientific classification
- Kingdom: Animalia
- Phylum: Chordata
- Class: Actinopterygii
- Division: Teleostei
- Order: Cypriniformes
- Family: Nemacheilidae
- Genus: Traccatichthys
- Species: T. zispi

Binomial name
- Traccatichthys zispi (Prokofiev, 2004)

Synonyms
- Micronemacheilus zispi (Prokofiev, 2004)

Species of fish

Traccatichthys zispi is a species of stone loach. It is regarded by some authorities as being of doubtful validity and of being a synonym of Traccatichthys taeniatus.
