= Afronemacheilus abyssinicus =

Conservation status
- Data Deficient (IUCN 3.1)

Scientific classification
- Kingdom: Animalia
- Phylum: Chordata
- Class: Actinopterygii
- Order: Cypriniformes
- Family: Nemacheilidae
- Genus: Afronemacheilus
- Species: A. abyssinicus

Binomial name
- Afronemacheilus abyssinicus (Boulenger, 1902)

Synonyms
- Nemacheilus abyssinicus Boulenger, 1902

Species of fish

Afronemacheilus abyssinicus is a species of stone loach endemic to Ethiopia. As such, it is known as the ethiopian loach. It is known from the Blue Nile at its outlet from Tana Lake (the type locality), with records from the Baro River. Originally the only species in its genus, in 2013 A. kaffa was described based on the Omo population, formerly included in A. abyssinicus.

A. abyssinicus can reach a standard length of 5.1 cm (2.0 in). The specific epithet, abyssinicus, is derived from Latin and means "Abyssinian" or "Ethiopian".
