= Kapuasia maculiceps =

Conservation status
- Data Deficient (IUCN 3.1)

Scientific classification
- Kingdom: Animalia
- Phylum: Chordata
- Class: Actinopterygii
- Division: Teleostei
- Order: Cypriniformes
- Family: Nemacheilidae
- Genus: Kapuasia
- Species: K. maculiceps

Binomial name
- Kapuasia maculiceps (Roberts, 1989)

Synonyms
- Nemacheilus maculiceps T. R. Roberts, 1989; Schistura maculiceps (T. R. Roberts, 1989)

Species of fish

Kapuasia maculiceps is a species of freshwater ray-finned fish belonging to the family Nemacheilidae, the stone loaches. It is endemic to West Borneo.
