= Paranemachilus genilepis =

Conservation status
- Data Deficient (IUCN 3.1)

Scientific classification
- Kingdom: Animalia
- Phylum: Chordata
- Class: Actinopterygii
- Order: Cypriniformes
- Family: Nemacheilidae
- Genus: Paranemachilus
- Species: P. genilepis

Binomial name
- Paranemachilus genilepis S. Q. Zhu, 1983

Species of fish

Paranemachilus genilepis is a species of stone loach endemic to China. This species can reach a length of 7 centimetres (2.8 in) SL. It is also found in the aquarium trade.
