= Afronemacheilus kaffa =

Scientific classification
- Kingdom: Animalia
- Phylum: Chordata
- Class: Actinopterygii
- Order: Cypriniformes
- Family: Nemacheilidae
- Genus: Afronemacheilus
- Species: A. kaffa

Binomial name
- Afronemacheilus kaffa Prokofiev & Golubtsov, 2013

Species of fish

Afronemacheilus kaffa is a species of freshwater ray-finned fish belonging to the family Nemacheilidae, the stone loaches. This species is found in the Omo-Turkana Basin in Ethiopia. This species was separated from A. abyssinicus in 2013 by Artém M. Prokofiev and Alexander S. Golubtsov.
