= Styxichthys gejiuensis =

Gejiu blind loach

Conservation status
- Critically endangered, possibly extinct (IUCN 3.1)

Scientific classification
- Kingdom: Animalia
- Phylum: Chordata
- Class: Actinopterygii
- Division: Teleostei
- Order: Cypriniformes
- Family: Nemacheilidae
- Genus: Styxichthys
- Species: S. gejiuensis

Binomial name
- Styxichthys gejiuensis (X. L. Chu & Y. R. Chen, 1979)

Synonyms
- Nemacheilus gejiuensis Chu & Chen, 1979; Triplophysa gejiuensis (Chu & Chen, 1979)

Species of fish

Styxichthys gejiuensis, the Gejiu blind loach, is a species of stone loach endemic to China. It is a troglomorphic fish whose eyes have degenerated into shallow concave pits. It found in a subterranean river 400 m (1,300 ft) underground in Gejiu, Yunnan.

== Threats ==
The fish is believed to occupy an area of only 4 km^{2} (1.5 sq mi). This area is adjacent to active tin mine workings which have destroyed the quality of the habitat. As no specimens have been collected since its initial description in 1979, the IUCN consider that it maybe extinct.
