= Koima =

Scientific classification
- Kingdom: Animalia
- Phylum: Chordata
- Class: Actinopterygii
- Division: Teleostei
- Order: Cypriniformes
- Family: Nemacheilidae
- Genus: Koima; Anoop, Dahanukar & Raghavan, 2024

Type species
- Mesonoemacheilus remadevii Shaji, 2002

Genus of fishes

Koima is a small genus of freshwater ray-finned fishes belonging to the family Nemacheilidae, the stone loaches. The loaches in this genus are found in the Western Ghats of southern India. The genus was described in 2024 to accommodate two species formerly placed in Mesonoemacheilus (K. remadevii) and Nemacheilus (K. monilis).

== Etymology ==
The generic name Koima is derived from a Malayalam vernacular term for loaches used in Kerala, India, where both species occur.

== Diagnosis ==
Koima is distinguished from other nemacheilid loaches by a combination of colour, morphology, and fin characteristics. Members of the genus have a yellowish‑brown ground colour with a single row of black spots along the lateral line, hyaline fins, and no stripe pattern on the flanks.

Both included species share these diagnostic traits: a lower adipose crest, absence of banding on the dorsal and caudal fins, and overall reduced colouration compared with related genera. Koima monilis additionally exhibits a narrow, deeply incised upper lip.

== Taxonomy and systematics ==
A multi‑gene phylogenetic analysis based on concatenated mitochondrial and nuclear gene markers resolved Koima remadevii and K. monilis to be a monophyletic group, sister to Schistura denisoni, supporting the distinctiveness of the genus and contributing to clarification of relationships within the widely regarded polyphyletic Nemacheilidae.

=== Species ===
Koima contains the following valid species:

- Koima monilis (Hora, 1921)
- Koima remadevii (Shaji, 2002)
