= Kayahschistura =

Scientific classification
- Kingdom: Animalia
- Phylum: Chordata
- Class: Actinopterygii
- Order: Cypriniformes
- Family: Nemacheilidae
- Genus: Kayahschistura; Kottelat & Grego, 2020
- Species: K. lokalayensis

Binomial name
- Kayahschistura lokalayensis Kottelat & Grego, 2020

Genus of fishes

Kayahschistura is a monospecific genus of freshwater ray-finned fish belonging to the family Nemacheilidae, the stone loaches. The only species in the genus is Kayahschistura lokalayensis, a cave fish which is known from two caves in the Hpruso District of the Kayah State in Myanmar.
