= Pteronemacheilus =

Scientific classification
- Domain: Eukaryota
- Kingdom: Animalia
- Phylum: Chordata
- Class: Actinopterygii
- Order: Cypriniformes
- Family: Nemacheilidae
- Genus: Pteronemacheilus; Bohlen & Šlechtová, 2011

Type species
- Pteronemacheilus lucidorsum Bohlen & Ŝlechtová, 2011

Genus of fishes

Pteronemacheilus is a genus of loaches in the family Nemacheilidae.

== Species ==
There are currently two recognized species in this genus:

- Pteronemacheilus lucidorsum Bohlen & Šlechtová, 2011
- Pteronemacheilus meridionalis (S. Q. Zhu, 1982)
