= Afronemacheilus =

Scientific classification
- Kingdom: Animalia
- Phylum: Chordata
- Class: Actinopterygii
- Order: Cypriniformes
- Family: Nemacheilidae
- Genus: Afronemacheilus; Golubtsov & Prokofiev, 2009

Type species
- Nemacheilus abyssinicus Boulenger, 1902

Genus of fishes

Afronemacheilus is a genus of freshwater ray-finned fish of belonging to the family, Nemacheilidae, the stone loaches. The fishes in this genus are endemic to Ethiopia.

== Species ==
There are currently 2 recognized species in this genus:

- Afronemacheilus abyssinicus (Boulenger, 1902)
- Afronemacheilus kaffa Prokofiev & Golubtsov, 2013
