= Kapuasia =

Scientific classification
- Kingdom: Animalia
- Phylum: Chordata
- Class: Actinopterygii
- Division: Teleostei
- Order: Cypriniformes
- Family: Nemacheilidae
- Genus: Kapuasia; Kottelat & Tan, 2024

Type species
- Nemacheilus maculiceps Roberts, 1989

Genus of fish

Kapuasia is a small genus of freshwater ray-finned fish belonging to the family Nemacheilidae, the stone loaches. The species in the genus are:

- Kapuasia falaris Kottelat, Tan & Hasan, 2024, a species which is endemic to South Borneo
- Kapuasia maculiceps (Roberts, 1989), a species which is endemic to West Borneo
