= Protonemacheilus =

Scientific classification
- Kingdom: Animalia
- Phylum: Chordata
- Class: Actinopterygii
- Order: Cypriniformes
- Family: Nemacheilidae
- Genus: Protonemacheilus; J. X. Yang & X. L. Chu, 1990
- Species: P. longipectoralis

Binomial name
- Protonemacheilus longipectoralis J. X. Yang & X. L. Chu, 1990

Species of fish

Protonemacheilus longipectoralis is a species of hillstream loach that is endemic to China. It is the only species in its genus.
