= Traccatichthys =

Scientific classification
- Kingdom: Animalia
- Phylum: Chordata
- Class: Actinopterygii
- Division: Teleostei
- Order: Cypriniformes
- Family: Nemacheilidae
- Genus: Traccatichthys; Freyhof & Serov, 2001

Type species
- Nemacheilus taeniatus Pellegrin & Chevey, 1936

Genus of fishes

Traccatichthys is a genus of stone loaches from southern China and Vietnam.

== Species ==
These are the currently recognized species in this genus:

- Traccatichthys annularis Endruweit, 2025
- Traccatichthys bacmeensis (Nguyen & Vo, 2005)
- Traccatichthys pulcher (Nichols & C. H. Pope, 1927)
- Traccatichthys punctulatus Qin, Zhou, Du & Lin, 2025
- Traccatichthys taeniatus (Pellegrin & Chevey, 1936)
- Traccatichthys tuberculum C. X. Du, E. Zhang & B. P. L. Chan, 2012
- Traccatichthys zispi (Prokofiev, 2004)
