= Dalistura =

Scientific classification
- Kingdom: Animalia
- Phylum: Chordata
- Class: Actinopterygii
- Division: Teleostei
- Order: Cypriniformes
- Family: Nemacheilidae
- Genus: Dalistura; Endruweit, 2025

Type species
- Schistura notasileum Endruweit, Yang & Liu, 2016

Genus of fishes

Dalistura is a genus of freshwater stone loaches in the family Nemacheilidae. The species of the genus are found in eastern Asia.

== Species ==
Dalistura contains the following valid species:

- Dalistura arenicola (Kottelat, 1998)
- Dalistura argyrogaster (Kottelat, 2021)
- Dalistura notasileum (Endruweit, Yang & Liu, 2016)
