= Kermanshah loach =

Scientific classification
- Kingdom: Animalia
- Phylum: Chordata
- Class: Actinopterygii
- Order: Cypriniformes
- Family: Nemacheilidae
- Genus: Sasanidus; Freyhof, Geiger, Golzarianpour & Patimar, 2016
- Species: S. kermanshahensis

Binomial name
- Sasanidus kermanshahensis (Bănărescu & Nalbant, 1966)

Synonyms
- Noemacheilus kermanshahensis Bănărescu & Nalbant, 1966; Nemacheilus kermanshahensis Bănărescu & Nalbant, 1966; Orthrias kermanshahensis (Bănărescu & Nalbant 1966); Barbatula kermanshahensis (Bănărescu & Nalbant 1966); Oxynoemacheilus kermanshahensis (Bănărescu & Nalbant 1966)

Species of fish

The Kermanshah loach (Sasanidus kermanshahensis) is a species of loach in the family Nemacheilidae endemic to Karkheh and Karun drainages in Iran. This species is the only member of its genus.
