= Magnischistura =

Scientific classification
- Kingdom: Animalia
- Phylum: Chordata
- Class: Actinopterygii
- Division: Teleostei
- Order: Cypriniformes
- Family: Nemacheilidae
- Genus: Magnischistura; Page, Pawangkhant, Tangjitjaroen, Cagle, Williams & Z. S. Randall, 2026
- Species: M. khaokrajom

Binomial name
- Magnischistura khaokrajom Page, Pawangkhant, Tangjitjaroen, Cagle, Williams & Z. S. Randall, 2026

Monospecific genus of fishes

Magnischistura is a monospecific genus of freshwater ray-finned fish belonging to the family Nemacheilidae, the stone loaches. The only species in the genus is Magnischistura khaokrajom. This taxon was first formally described in 2026 with its type locality given as Huay Thong An, Mae Klong River basin, Suan Phueng District, Ratchaburi Province, Thailand at 13.54732N, 99.20394E from an elevation of 650 m (2,130 ft). This taxon is similar to some other stone loaches in that it has a round flap below the eye with tubercles at its tip and adult males have a highly modified pectoral fin, however molecular analysis did not show a close relationship to any related taxa. This may be distinguished from related taxa by having a suborbital flap in the females. It is thought that the males use their highly modified pectoral fins to manipulate the females when spawning.
