= Styxichthys =

Scientific classification
- Kingdom: Animalia
- Phylum: Chordata
- Class: Actinopterygii
- Division: Teleostei
- Order: Cypriniformes
- Family: Nemacheilidae
- Genus: Styxichthys; Endruweit, 2025

Type species
- Noemacheilus gejiuensis X. L. Chu & Y. R. Chen, 1979

Genus of fishes

Styxichthys is a genus of freshwater ray-finned fish belonging to the family Nemacheilidae, the stone loaches. The fishes in this genus are found in caves in Yunnan.

== Species ==
Styxichthys contains the following valid species:

- Styxichthys gejiuensis (X. L. Chu & Y. R. Chen, 1979)
- Styxichthys xichouensis (Liu, Pan, J. X. Yang & X. Y. Chen, 2017)
