= Absumbra =

Scientific classification
- Kingdom: Animalia
- Phylum: Chordata
- Class: Actinopterygii
- Division: Teleostei
- Order: Cypriniformes
- Family: Nemacheilidae
- Genus: Absumbra; Endruweit, 2025

Type species
- Physoschistura absumbra Endruweit, 2017

Genus of fishes

Absumbra is a genus of freshwater ray-finned fishes belonging to the family Nemacheilidae, the stone loaches. The loaches in this genus are found in eastern Asia.

== Species ==
Absumbra contains the following valid species:

- Absumbra absumbra (Endruweit, 2017)
- Absumbra kongi Endruweit, 2025
- Absumbra nigriventer Endruweit, 2025
