= Pogonoschistura =

Scientific classification
- Kingdom: Animalia
- Phylum: Chordata
- Class: Actinopterygii
- Division: Teleostei
- Order: Cypriniformes
- Family: Nemacheilidae
- Genus: Pogonoschistura; Bohlen, Dvořák & Šlechtová, 2026

Type species
- Pogonoschistura pawaiensis Bohlen, Dvořák & Šlechtová, 2026

Genus of fishes

Pogonoschistura is a genus of freshwater ray-finned fish belonging to the family Nemacheilidae, the stone loaches. The fishes in this genus are found in Thailand and Cambodia.

== Species ==
Pogonoschistura contains the following valid species:

- Pogonoschistura kohchangensis (Smith, 1933)
- Pogonoschistura pawaiensis Bohlen, Dvořák & Šlechtová, 2026
