= Rectoris =

Scientific classification
- Kingdom: Animalia
- Phylum: Chordata
- Class: Actinopterygii
- Order: Cypriniformes
- Family: Cyprinidae
- Subfamily: Labeoninae
- Genus: Rectoris; S. Y. Lin, 1935

Type species
- Rectoris posehensis Lin, 1935

Genus of fishes

Rectoris is a genus of cyprinid fish found in China and Vietnam.

== Species ==
There are currently five recognized species in this genus:

- Rectoris longibarbus D. G. Zhu, E. Zhang & J. H. Lan, 2012
- Rectoris longifinus W. X. Li, W. N. Mao & Zong-Min Lu, 2002
- Rectoris luxiensis H. W. Wu & Yao, 1977
- Rectoris mutabilis (S. Y. Lin, 1933)
- Rectoris posehensis S. Y. Lin, 1935
