= Claea =

Scientific classification
- Kingdom: Animalia
- Phylum: Chordata
- Class: Actinopterygii
- Division: Teleostei
- Order: Cypriniformes
- Family: Nemacheilidae
- Genus: Claea; Kottelat, 2011

Synonyms
- Oreias Sauvage, 1874

Genus of fish

Claea is a genus of stone loaches.

Before recent expansion, it was formerly a monotypic genus. Other former members; C. sonlaensis is now the only species in Haotula and C. trilineatus is now in Schistura as trilineata.

The genus name is an allusion to Claea, an Oread mountain nymph from Greek mythology. The name is a necessary replacement of Oreias which was preoccupied.

== Species ==
There are currently six valid species:

- Claea dabryi (Sauvage, 1874)
- Claea dafangensis Wang, Luo & Zhou, 2026 (Dafang mountain loach)
- Claea minibarba Zhang, Luo, Huang & Zhang, 2024
- Claea scet Lei, He, Huang, Zhou & He, 2025
- Claea tongziensis Zhao, Lv, Huang & Liu 2026
- Claea wulongensis (Chen, Sheraliev, Shu & Peng, 2021
