= Rectoris mutabilis =

Conservation status
- Least Concern (IUCN 3.1)

Scientific classification
- Kingdom: Animalia
- Phylum: Chordata
- Class: Actinopterygii
- Order: Cypriniformes
- Family: Cyprinidae
- Genus: Rectoris
- Species: R. mutabilis

Binomial name
- Rectoris mutabilis (S. Y. Lin, 1933)

Synonyms
- Epalzeorhynchus mutabilis S. Y. Lin, 1933; Crossocheilus mutabilis (S. Y. Lin, 1933)

Species of fish

Rectoris mutabilis is a species of freshwater ray-finned fish belonging to the family Cyprinidae, the family which includes the carps, barbs. minnows and related fishes. This species is endemic to Yunnan in China. This species is endemic to China in the drainage basin of the Yangtze in Guizhou, Hunan, Chongqing and Hubei. One study found that there were no discernible differences between the specimens of this species and R. luxiensis suggested that R. mutabilis is s senior synonym of R, luxiensis. Eschmeyer's Catalog of Fishes, however, recognises both these taxa as valid species.
