= Rectoris luxiensis =

Conservation status
- Data Deficient (IUCN 3.1)

Scientific classification
- Kingdom: Animalia
- Phylum: Chordata
- Class: Actinopterygii
- Order: Cypriniformes
- Family: Cyprinidae
- Genus: Rectoris
- Species: R. luxiensis

Binomial name
- Rectoris luxiensis H. W. Wu & Yao, 1977

Species of fish

Rectoris luxiensis is a species of freshwater ray-finned fish belonging to the family Cyprinidae, the family which includes the carps, barbs, minnows, and related fishes. This species is endemic to China, where it is found in the Yuan Jiang in Hunan, Qing Jiang in Hubei Province and the Daninghe River in Sichuan. One study found that there were no discernible differences between the specimens of this species and the types of R. mutabilis suggested that R. mutabilis is s senior synonym of R, luxiensis. Eschmeyer's Catalog of Fishes, however, recognises both these taxa as valid species.
