= Iskandaria =

Scientific classification
- Kingdom: Animalia
- Phylum: Chordata
- Class: Actinopterygii
- Order: Cypriniformes
- Family: Nemacheilidae
- Genus: Iskandaria; Prokofiev, 2017

Type species
- Nemacheilus kuschakewitschi Herzenstein, 1890

Genus of fishes

Iskandaria is a genus of freshwater ray-finned fishes belonging to the family Nemacheilidae, the stone loaches. The two species in this genus are found in northern Central Asia.

== Species ==
Iskandra contains the following two recognised species:

- Iskandaria kuschakewitschi (Herzenstein, 1890) (Kuschakewitsch loach)
- Iskandaria pardalis (Turdakov 1941)
