= Tuberoschistura =

Scientific classification
- Kingdom: Animalia
- Phylum: Chordata
- Class: Actinopterygii
- Order: Cypriniformes
- Family: Nemacheilidae
- Genus: Tuberoschistura; Kottelat, 1990

Type species
- Noemacheilus baenzingeri Kottelat, 1983

Genus of fishes

Tuberoschistura is a small genus of stone loaches found in Southeast Asia.

== Species ==
There are currently two recognized species in this genus:

- Tuberoschistura baenzigeri (Kottelat, 1983)
- Tuberoschistura cambodgiensis Kottelat, 1990
