= Rhyacoschistura =

Scientific classification
- Kingdom: Animalia
- Phylum: Chordata
- Class: Actinopterygii
- Division: Teleostei
- Order: Cypriniformes
- Family: Nemacheilidae
- Genus: Rhyacoschistura; Kottelat, 2019

Type species
- Rhyacoschistura larreci Kottelat, 2019

Species
- 7, see text

Genus of fishes

Rhyacoschistura is a genus of stone loaches from Laos, India and Thailand. It was described in 2019 to accommodate a new species, R. larreci. Additionally, Rhyacoschistura suber was redescribed with new adult specimens and was moved to Rhyacoschistura from Schistura.

== Species ==
There are currently seven described species in the genus:

- Rhyacoschistura ferruginea (Lokeshwor & Vishwanath, 2013)
- Rhyacoschistura larreci Kottelat, 2019
- Rhyacoschistura maculosa (Lalronunga, Lalnuntluanga & Lalramliana, 2013)
- Rhyacoschistura maejotigrina (Suvarnaraksha, 2012)
- Rhyacoschistura manipurensis (Chaudhuri, 1912)
- Rhyacoschistura porocephala (Lokeshwor & Vishwanath, 2013)
- Rhyacoschistura suber (Kottelat, 2000)
