= Paranemachilus =

Scientific classification
- Kingdom: Animalia
- Phylum: Chordata
- Class: Actinopterygii
- Division: Teleostei
- Order: Cypriniformes
- Family: Nemacheilidae
- Genus: Paranemachilus; S. Q. Zhu, 1983

Type species
- Paranemachilus genilepis S. Q. Zhu, 1983

Synonyms
- Heminoemacheilus S. Q. Zhu & W.-X. Cao, 1987

Genus of fishes

Paranemachilus is a genus of stone loaches endemic to China. They live in subterranean bodies of water such as rivers.

The genus was erected in 1983 with the description of P. genilepis. After the genus was established it was a monotypic genus for around three decades until 2013 with the description of P. pingguoensis.

== Species ==
There are currently seven recognized species belonging to this genus:

- Paranemachilus genilepis S. Q. Zhu, 1983
- Paranemachilus jinxiensis (Zhu, L.-N. Du & X.-Y. Chen, 2009)
- Paranemachilus liui H.-L. Mo, Yang, P. Li & L.-N. Du, 2024
- Paranemachilus luegvetensis Mo, Yang, Li & Du, 2024
- Paranemachilus nonggangensis Mo, Zhou, Deng, Wang, Du & Nong, 2026
- Paranemachilus pingguoensis X. Gan, 2013
- Paranemachilus zhengbaoshani (S. Q. Zhu & W.-X. Cao, 1987)
