= Pogonoschistura kohchangensis =

Conservation status
- Data Deficient (IUCN 3.1)

Scientific classification
- Kingdom: Animalia
- Phylum: Chordata
- Class: Actinopterygii
- Division: Teleostei
- Order: Cypriniformes
- Family: Nemacheilidae
- Genus: Pogonoschistura
- Species: P. kohchangensis

Binomial name
- Pogonoschistura kohchangensis (H. M. Smith, 1933)

Synonyms
- Nemacheilus kohchangensis H. M. Smith, 1933; Schistura kohchangensis (H. M. Smith, 1933); Nemacheilus deignani H. M. Smith, 1945; Schistura deignani (Smith 1945)

Species of fish

Pogonoschistura kohchangensis of freshwater ray-finned fish belonging to the family Nemacheilidae, the stone loaches. This fish is found in moderately to fast flowing streams with gravel to stone substrates in eastern Thailand and Cambodia. This species reaches a standard length of7.5 cm (3.0 in).
