= Paranemachilus jinxiensis =

Conservation status
- Least Concern (IUCN 3.1)

Scientific classification
- Kingdom: Animalia
- Phylum: Chordata
- Class: Actinopterygii
- Order: Cypriniformes
- Family: Nemacheilidae
- Genus: Paranemachilus
- Species: P. jinxiensis

Binomial name
- Paranemachilus jinxiensis (Y. Zhu, L. N. Du & X. Y. Chen, 2009)

Synonyms
- Yunnanilus jinxiensis Zhu, Du & Chen, 2009

Species of fish

Paranemachilus jinxiensis is a species of ray-finned fish, a stone loach in the genus Paranemachilus. It is found in the Pearl River drainage in Guangxi and its type locality is Ludon village in Jingxi County, its specific name refers to Jingxi County.
