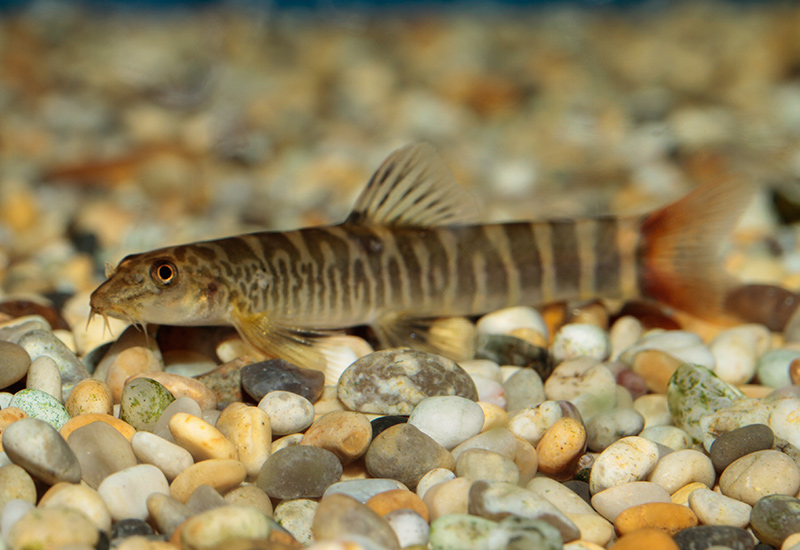
- Neonoemacheilus labeosus

Scientific classification
- Kingdom: Animalia
- Phylum: Chordata
- Class: Actinopterygii
- Order: Cypriniformes
- Family: Nemacheilidae
- Genus: Neonoemacheilus; S. Q. Zhu & Q. Z. Guo, 1985

Type species
- Noemacheilus labeosus Kottelat, 1982

Synonyms
- Infundibulatus Menon, 1987

= Neonoemacheilus =

Genus of fishes

Neonoemacheilus is a genus of Asian stone loaches.

== Species ==
There are currently four recognized species in this genus:

- Neonoemacheilus assamensis (Menon, 1987)
- Neonoemacheilus labeosus (Kottelat, 1982)
- Neonoemacheilus mengdingensis S. Q. Zhu & Q. Z. Guo, 1989
- Neonoemacheilus peguensis (Hora, 1929)
