= Vurxastroma =

Scientific classification
- Kingdom: Animalia
- Phylum: Chordata
- Class: Actinopterygii
- Division: Teleostei
- Order: Cypriniformes
- Family: Nemacheilidae
- Genus: Vurxastroma; Endruweit, 2025

Type species
- Nemachilus grahami Regan, 1906

Genus of fishes

Vurxastroma is a genus of freshwater ray-finned fish belonging to the family Nemacheilidae, the stone loaches. The fishes in this genus are found in the Red River system in China.

== Species ==
Vurxastroma contains the following valid species:

- Vurxastroma grahami (Regan, 1906)
- Vurxastroma laticeps (W. Zhou & Cui, 1997)
