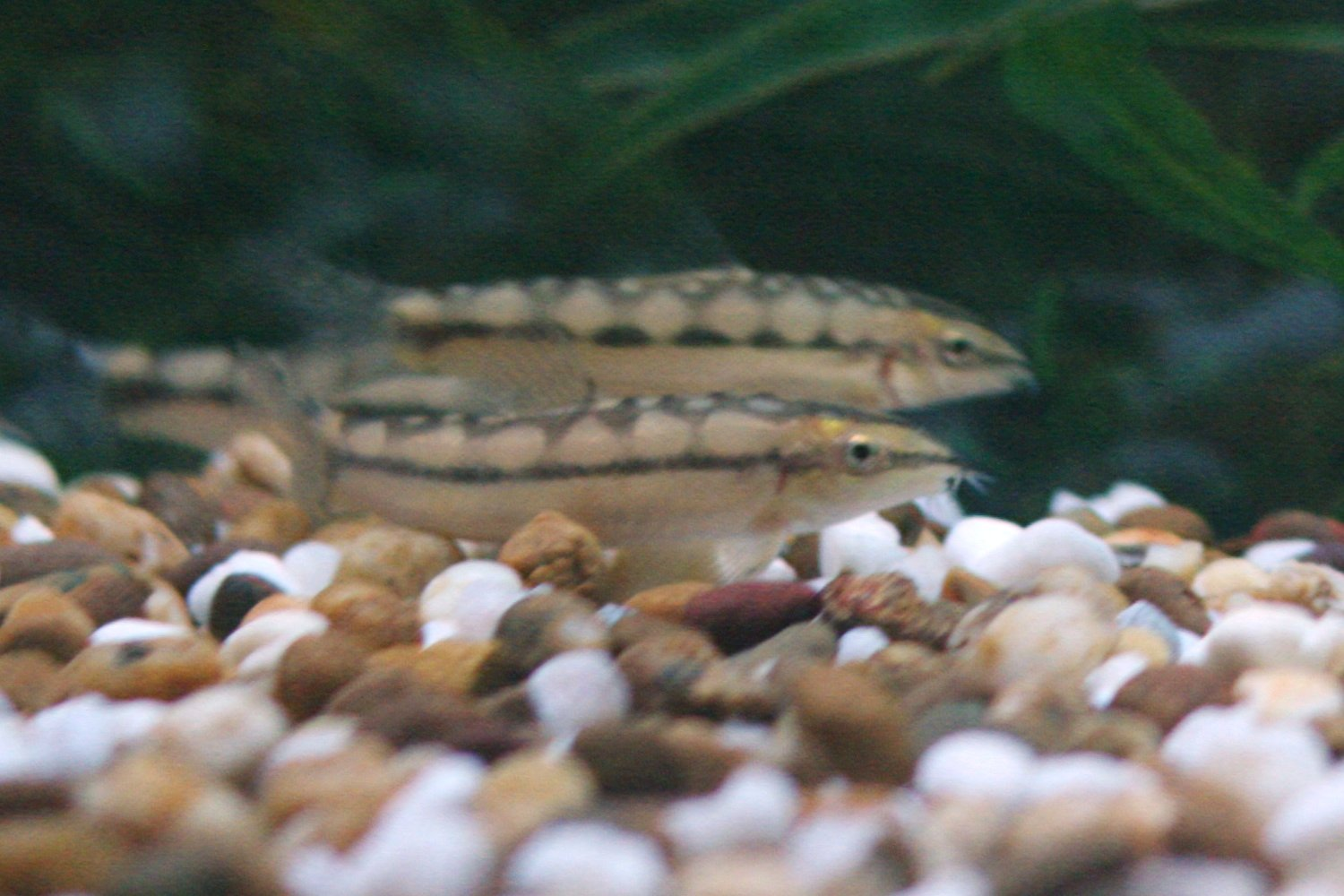
- Dwarf Botia (A. sidthimunki)

Scientific classification
- Domain: Eukaryota
- Kingdom: Animalia
- Phylum: Chordata
- Class: Actinopterygii
- Order: Cypriniformes
- Family: Botiidae
- Genus: Ambastaia; Kottelat, 2012

Type species
- Botia nigrolineata Kottelat & Chu 1987

= Ambastaia =

Genus of fishes

Ambastaia is a genus of botiid loaches native to Mainland Southeast Asia and China. The species in this genus were formerly included in Yasuhikotakia.

== Species ==
There are currently two recognized species in this genus:

- Ambastaia nigrolineata (Kottelat & X. L. Chu, 1987)
- Ambastaia sidthimunki (Klausewitz, 1959) (Dwarf botia)
