= Smithstura =

Scientific classification
- Kingdom: Animalia
- Phylum: Chordata
- Class: Actinopterygii
- Division: Teleostei
- Order: Cypriniformes
- Family: Nemacheilidae
- Genus: Smithstura; Endruweit, 2025

Type species
- Nemachilus longus S.-Q. Zhu, 1982

Genus of fishes

Smithstura is a genus of freshwater ray-finned fish belonging to the family Nemacheilidae, the stone loaches. The fishes in this genus are found in Southeast Asia and southern China.

== Species ==
Smithstura contains the following valid species:

- Smithstura greenei (Endruweit, 2017)
- Smithstura hoai (V. H. Nguyen, 2006)
- Smithstura longa (S.-Q.Zhu, 1982)
- Smithstura paucicincta (Kottelat, 1990)
- Smithstura poculi (H. M. Smith, 1945)
- Smithstura thavonei (Kottelat, 2017)
