= Sectoria =

Scientific classification
- Kingdom: Animalia
- Phylum: Chordata
- Class: Actinopterygii
- Order: Cypriniformes
- Family: Nemacheilidae
- Genus: Sectoria; Kottelat, 1990

Type species
- Noemacheilus atriceps H. M. Smith, 1945

Genus of fishes

Sectoria is a small genus of stone loaches native to eastern Asia.

== Species ==
There are currently two recognized species in this genus:

- Sectoria atriceps (H. M. Smith, 1945)
- Sectoria heterognathos (Y. F. Chen, 1999)
