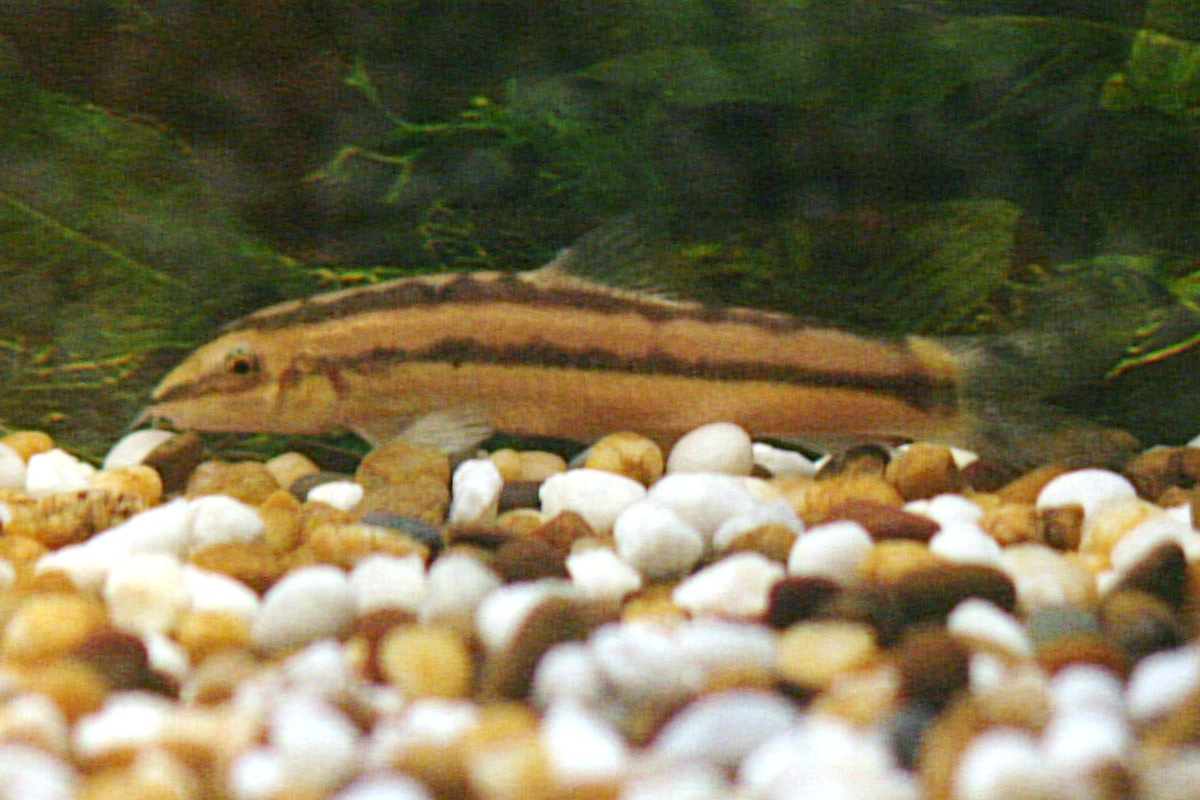

Conservation status
- Vulnerable (IUCN 3.1)

Scientific classification
- Kingdom: Animalia
- Phylum: Chordata
- Class: Actinopterygii
- Order: Cypriniformes
- Family: Botiidae
- Genus: Ambastaia
- Species: A. nigrolineata

Binomial name
- Ambastaia nigrolineata (Chu & Kottelat, 1987)

Synonyms
- Botia nigrolineata Kottelat & Chu, 1987; Yasuhikotakia nigrolineata (Kottelat & Chu, 1987)

= Ambastaia nigrolineata =

Species of loach fish

Ambastaia nigrolineata is a vulnerable species of loach found in the Mekong basin in Southeast Asia and China. It occurs in clear, fast-flowing riffles and hillstreams with moderate currents and substrates composed primarily of sand. It is known to feed on insect larvae and other benthic organisms.

Ambastaia nigrolineata reaches 8 cm (3.1 inches) in standard length. It is sometimes seen in the aquarium trade, but it has historically been confused with the only other species in the genus, the similar A. sidthimunki.
