= Haotula =

Scientific classification
- Kingdom: Animalia
- Phylum: Chordata
- Class: Actinopterygii
- Division: Teleostei
- Order: Cypriniformes
- Family: Nemacheilidae
- Genus: Haotula; Endruweit, 2025
- Species: H. sonlaensis

Binomial name
- Haotula sonlaensis (Nguyen, Nguyen & Hoang, 2010)

Synonyms
- Oreias sonlaensis Nguyen, Nguyen & Hoang, 2010; Claea sonlaensis (Nguyen, Nguyen & Hoang, 2010); Schistura sonlaensis (Nguyen, Nguyen & Hoang, 2010)

Monospecific genus of fishes

Haotula is a monospecific genus of freshwater ray-finned fish belonging to the family Nemacheilidae, the stone loaches. The only species in the genus is Haotula sonlaensis. This taxon is endemic to Vietnam where it was described in 2010 as Oreias sonlaensis from Lake Bom Hau, Chieng Xom Commune, Son La City, in the basin of the Da River, living in caves in the dry season and moving out into shallow surface waters in the floods. This species reaches a standard length of 6.4 cm (2.5 in).
