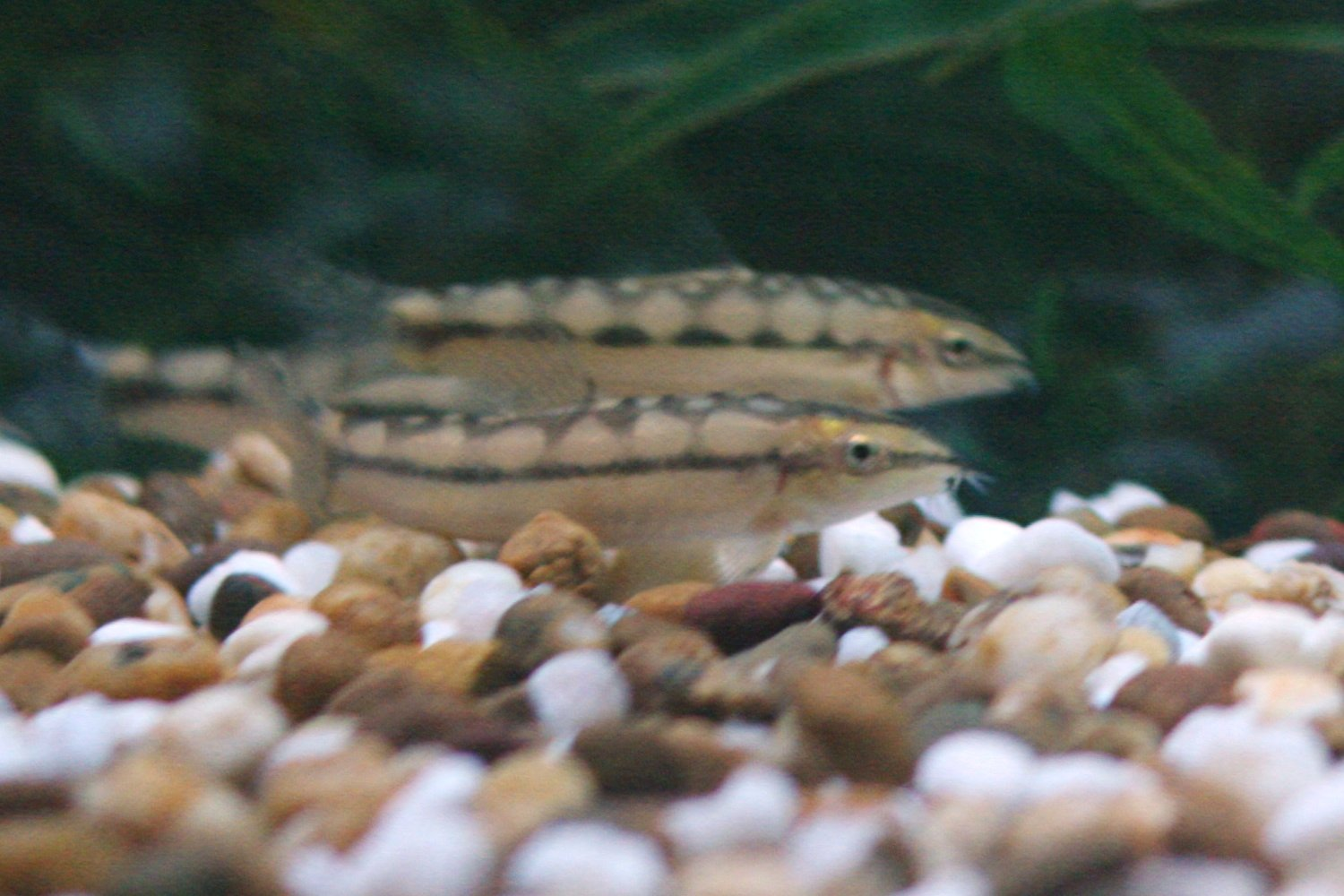

Conservation status
- Endangered (IUCN 3.1)

Scientific classification
- Kingdom: Animalia
- Phylum: Chordata
- Class: Actinopterygii
- Order: Cypriniformes
- Family: Botiidae
- Genus: Ambastaia
- Species: A. sidthimunki

Binomial name
- Ambastaia sidthimunki (Klausewitz, 1959)

Synonyms
- Botia sidthimunki Klausewitz, 1959; Yasuhikotakia sidthimunki (Klausewitz, 1959)

= Dwarf loach =

Species of fish

The dwarf loach, ladderback loach, pygmy loach, chain loach or chain botia (Ambastaia sidthimunki) is a freshwater fish belonging to the family Botiidae. Formerly included in the genus Yasuhikotakia, it is frequently seen in the aquarium trade, the product of captive breeding.

This endangered species is endemic to the Mae Klong basin (including Khwae Noi River) in Thailand, and the Ataran River on the Thai-Myanmar border. Records from the Mekong basin are misidentifications of the very similar and closely related A. nigrolineata.

== Size and habitat ==
The dwarf loach can grow up to 6 cm (2.4 in) in length. It prefers water with temperature 25–30 °C (77–86 °F), pH 6.5 to 6.9 dGH to 8.0. It is omnivorous, with a diet including live crustaceans, insects, snails, etc.

The dwarf loach is found in the Mae Klong River and the Khwae Noi River in western Thailand. This species is endangered and is a protected species in Thailand. It was thought to be extinct in the wild until recently rediscovered in Sangkhla Buri. While they disappeared from the wild, it remained in the aquarium trade because of artificial breeding by private fish farms for over three decades.

The fish was discovered by Somphong Lekaree (สมพงษ์ เล็กอารีย์) and Damri Sukaram (ดำริ สุขอร่าม) in 1959. Lekaree was an aquarium fish exporter while Sukaram was a fisherman for aquarium trade.

The specific epithet of this fish honors Aree Sidthimunk (Thai: อารีย์ สิทธิมังค์), a researcher at Department of Fisheries, Ministry of Agriculture.

== Related species ==
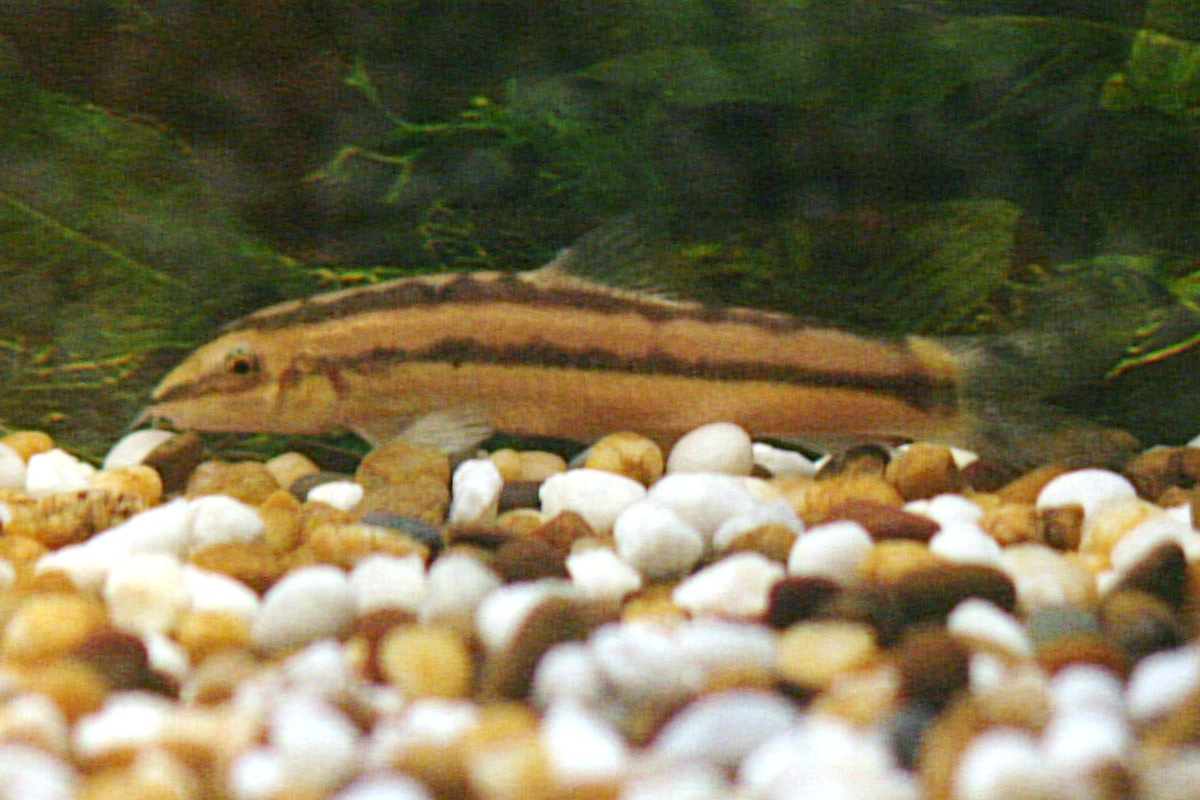
Ambastaia nigrolineata at about 7cm SL

The dwarf loach closely resembles Ambastaia nigrolineata, another Thai protected species, especially when the fish is fully grown. The difference is easily seen when the fish is still small. Juveniles of A. sidthimunki have dotted patterns while A. nigrolineata have horizontal lines on them. Furthermore, the chain pattern of A. sidthimunki develops in fish at a smaller size.

== See also ==
- List of freshwater aquarium fish species
