= Rectoris posehensis =

Scientific classification
- Kingdom: Animalia
- Phylum: Chordata
- Class: Actinopterygii
- Order: Cypriniformes
- Family: Cyprinidae
- Genus: Rectoris
- Species: R. posehensis

Binomial name
- Rectoris posehensis S. Y. Lin, 1935

Species of fish

Rectoris posehensis is a species of freshwater ray-finned fish belonging to the family Cyprinidae, the family which includes the carps, barbs. minnows and related fishes. This species is found in rivers where there is a swift current in China.
