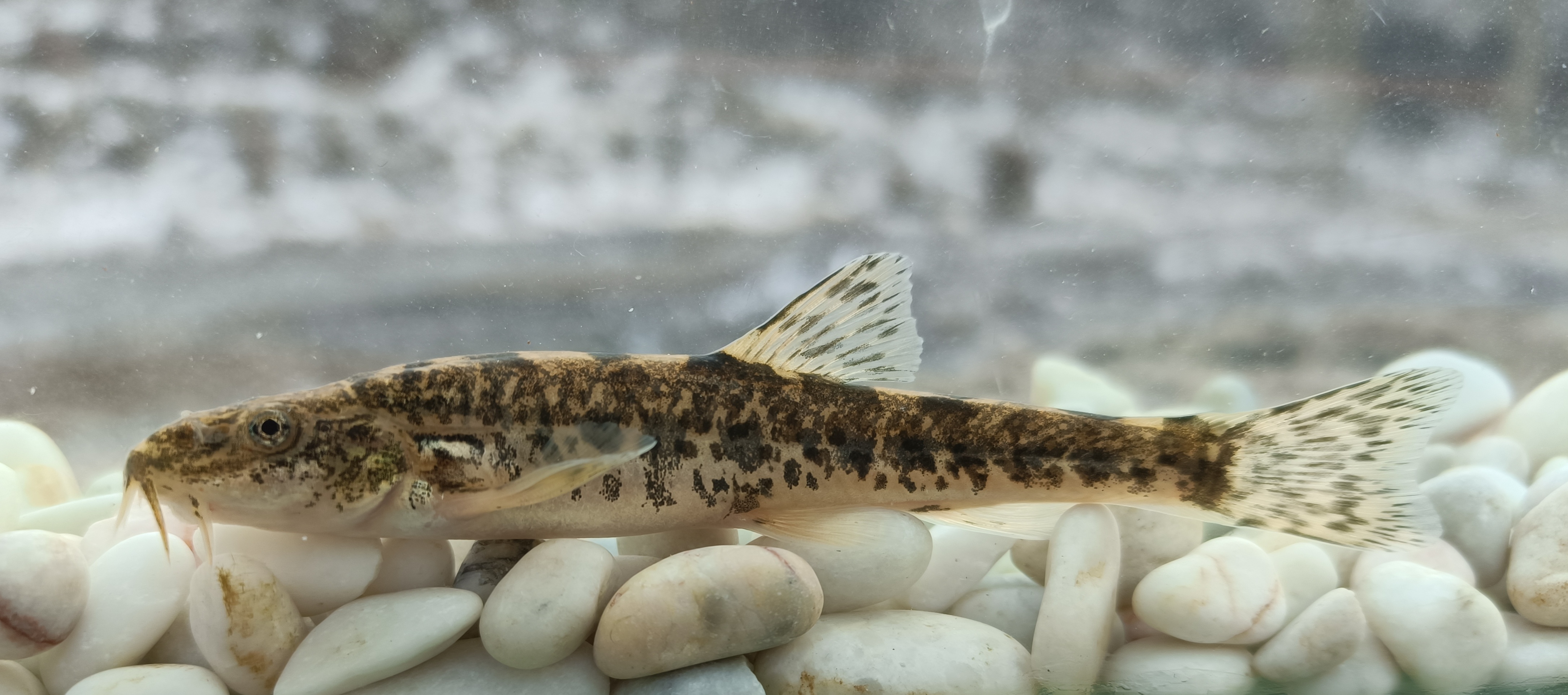
- Triplophysa ferganaensis

Scientific classification
- Kingdom: Animalia
- Phylum: Chordata
- Class: Actinopterygii
- Division: Teleostei
- Order: Cypriniformes
- Suborder: Cobitoidei
- Family: Nemacheilidae; Regan, 1911

Genera
- 63, see text

= Nemacheilidae =

Family of fishes

The Nemacheilidae, or stone loaches, are a family of cypriniform fishes that inhabit stream environments, mostly in Eurasia, with one genus, Afronemacheilus, found in Africa. The family includes 922 valid species.

== Genera ==
The following are the described genera of the family:

- Aborichthys B. L. Chaudhuri, 1913
- Absumbra Endruweit, 2025
- Acanthocobitis Peters, 1861
- Acoura Swainson, 1839
- Afronemacheilus Golubtsov & Prokofiev, 2009
- Barbatula Linck, 1790
- Claea Kottelat, 2011
- Dalistura Endruweit, 2025
- Draconectes Kottelat, 2012
- Dzihunia Prokofiev, 2001
- Eidinemacheilus Segherloo, Ghaedrahmati & Freyhof, 2016
- Eonemachilus Berg, 1938
- Haotula Endruweit, 2025
- Hedinichthys Rendahl, 1933
- Homatula Nichols, 1925
- Indoreonectes Rita & Nalbant, 1978
- Iskandaria Prokofiev, 2009
- Kapuasia Kottelat & H. H. Tan, 2024
- Karstsinnectes J. Zhou, Luo, Y.-L.Wang, J.-J. Zhou & Xiao, 2023
- Kayahschistura Kottelat & Grego, 2020
- Koima Anoop, Dahanukar & Raghavan, 2024
- Labiatophysa Prokofiev, 2010
- Lefua Herzenstein, 1888
- Magnischistura Page, Pawangkhant, Tangjitjaroen, Cagle, Williams & Z. S. Randall, 2026
- Malihkaia Kottelat, 2017
- Mesonoemacheilus Bănărescu & Nalbant, 1982
- Micronemacheilus Rendahl, 1944
- Mustura Kottelat, 2018
- Nemacheilus Bleeker, 1863
- Nemachilichthys Day, 1878
- Neonoemacheilus S. Q. Zhu & Q. Z. Guo, 1985
- Nun Bănărescu & Nalbant, 1982
- Oreonectes Günther, 1868
- Oxynoemacheilus Bănărescu & Nalbant, 1966
- Paracanthocobitis S. Grant, 2007
- Paracobitis Bleeker, 1863
- Paranemachilus S.-Q. Zhu, 1983
- Paraschistura Prokofiev, 2009
- Petruichthys Menon, 1987
- Physoschistura Bănărescu & Nalbant, 1982
- Pogonoschistura Bohlen, Dvořák & Šlechtová, 2026
- Protonemacheilus J. X. Yang & X. L. Chu, 1990
- Pteronemacheilus Bohlen & Šlechtová, 2011
- Rheostura Endruweit, 2025
- Rhyacoschistura Kottelat, 2019
- Sasanidus Freyhof, Geiger, Golzarianpour & Patimar, 2016
- Schistura McClelland, 1838
- Sectoria Kottelat, 1990
- Seminemacheilus Bănărescu & Nalbant, 1995
- Smithstura Endruweit, 2025
- Speonectes Kottelat, 2012
- Sphaerophysa W.-X. Cao & S.-Q. Zhu, 1988
- Styxichthys Endruweit, 2025
- Sundoreonectes Kottelat, 1990
- Traccatichthys Freyhof & Serov, 2001
- Triplophysa Rendahl, 1933
- Troglonectes C. G. Zhang, Y. H. Zhao & L. Tang, 2016
- Tuberoschistura Kottelat, 1990
- Turcinoemacheilus Bănărescu & Nalbant, 1964
- Vurxastroma Endruweit, 2025
- Yunnanilus Nichols, 1925
- Zhustura Endruweit, 2025
