= Neate =

Neate is a surname. Notable people with the surname include:

- Aiden Neate (born 2006), British racing driver
- Adam Neate (born 1977), British painter, conceptual artist, and street artist
- Andy Neate (born 1974), British racing driver
- Charles Neate (1806–1879), English politician and academic
- Charles Neate (musician) (1784–1877), British pianist and composer
- Clarry Neate (1904–1972), Australian racehorse trainer and caricaturist
- Derek Neate (1927–2014), British footballer
- Florence Pannell (née Neate; 1868–1980), British businesswoman and supercentenarian
- Gordon Neate (1941–2019), British footballer
- Harry Neate (1894–1956), Australian rules footballer
- Kenneth Neate (1914–1997), Australian operatic and concert tenor, opera producer and singing teacher
- Patrick Neate (born 1970), British novelist, journalist, playwright and podcaster
- Patrick Neate (cricketer) (born 1946), former English cricketer
- Polly Neate, Baroness Neate, British social commentator, social policy expert and philanthropist
- Stephen Neate Dark (1815–1972), Australian politician

== See also ==
- Neat (disambiguation)
- Neet (disambiguation)
- Ryan Neates (born 1991), Australian rules footballer
