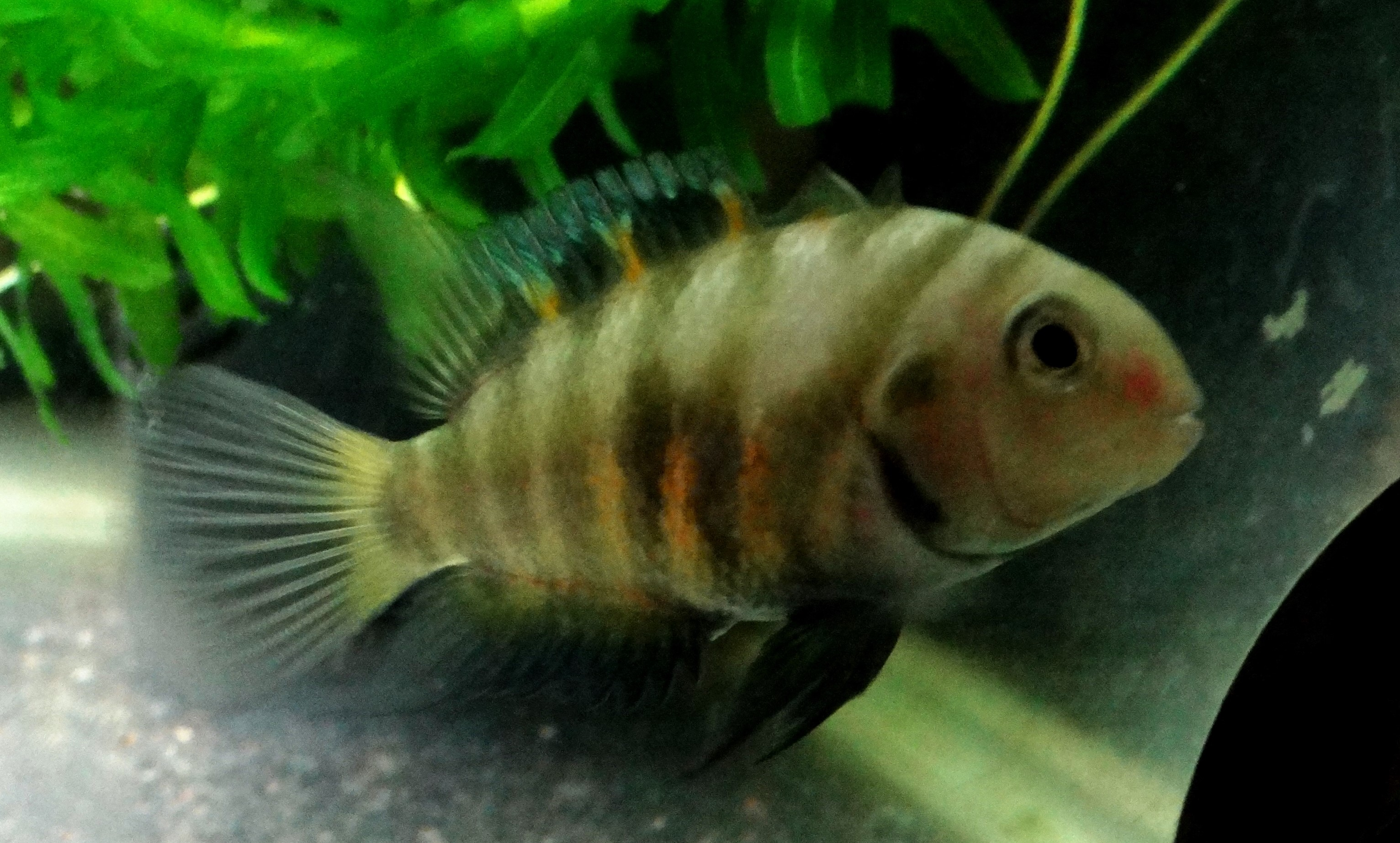

Conservation status
- Least Concern (IUCN 3.1)

Scientific classification
- Domain: Eukaryota
- Kingdom: Animalia
- Phylum: Chordata
- Class: Actinopterygii
- Order: Cichliformes
- Family: Cichlidae
- Genus: Amatitlania
- Species: A. septemfasciata

Binomial name
- Amatitlania septemfasciata (Regan, 1908)

Synonyms
- Archocentrus septemfasciatus (Regan, 1908); Cichlasoma septemfasciatum Regan, 1908; Cryptoheros septemfasciatus (Regan, 1908)

= Amatitlania septemfasciata =

Species of fish

Amatitlania septemfasciata (sometimes called the Seven-stripe Cichlid or Cutter's Cichlid) is a fish species in the cichlid family. It is found on the Atlantic slope of Costa Rica, between the San Juan River drainage and the Banano River. Several currently recognized cichlid species within the genus Amatitlania were formerly considered varieties of Amatitlania septumfasciata, including Amatitlania myrnae, the Topaz Cichlid, and Amatitlania cutteri (which also sometimes uses the common name "Cutter's Cichlid").

Prior to being placed in the genus Amatitlania, it had been considered a member of the genus Archocentrus. Within Amatitlania, Amatitlania septemfasciata is placed in the subgenus Bussingius, along with the T-bar Cichlid and several other species. However, a 2008 study led by Oldřich Říčan has suggested that all the related species A. septemfasciatus, should be moved into the genus Hypsophrys.

== Natural history ==
Amatitlania septemfasciata grows to between 4 and 5 inches (10 and 13 cm). Males are typically larger than females. Both sexes generally have six vertical bars along each side. Females have a black spot or ocellus on the dorsal fin, which is generally surrounded by metallic coloration.

It lives in rivers on the Atlantic slope of Costa Rica. It can be found in rivers of all velocities, including slow moving and fast moving rivers. The bottom of the rivers it lives in are generally covered by rocks and leaf litter. In its natural habitat, the pH is generally between 6.6 and 7.6 and the water temperature is between 21 and 27 degrees Celsius (70 to 81 degrees Fahrenheit). Its ability to protrude its jaw 3.5% standard length limits its diet to about 1% evasive prey.

Amatitlania septemfasciata is an egg layer and a cave spawner. In breeds in crevices in the rocks at the bottom of the river. Spawnings typically result in 200 to 250 fry.

The conservation status of Amatitlania septemfasciata has not been evaluated by the International Union for Conservation of Nature (IUCN).

== Aquarium keeping ==
Amatitlania septemfasciata is kept in home aquariums. It is territorial, and thus a fairly large tank that is at least 90 to 100 centimetres (35 to 39 in) long is generally recommended. It can be kept at a temperature of between 24 and 26 degrees Celsius (75 to 79 degrees Fahrenheit), and pH of about 7.0. In the home aquarium, it is willing to eat a wide variety of foods, including flake food, live foods, frozen foods, beef heart and shrimp.

Amatitlania septemfasciata can be bred in the home aquarium. It will either spawn in a cave or in the open. A temperature increase to 26 and 28 degrees Celsius (79 to 82 degrees Fahrenheit) helps induce spawning. The larvae hatch 72 to 80 hours after spawning, and are free swimming after 180 to 200 hours. The parents do not eat the fry, but rather both parents care for the fry intensively. The fry eat newly hatched brine shrimp.
