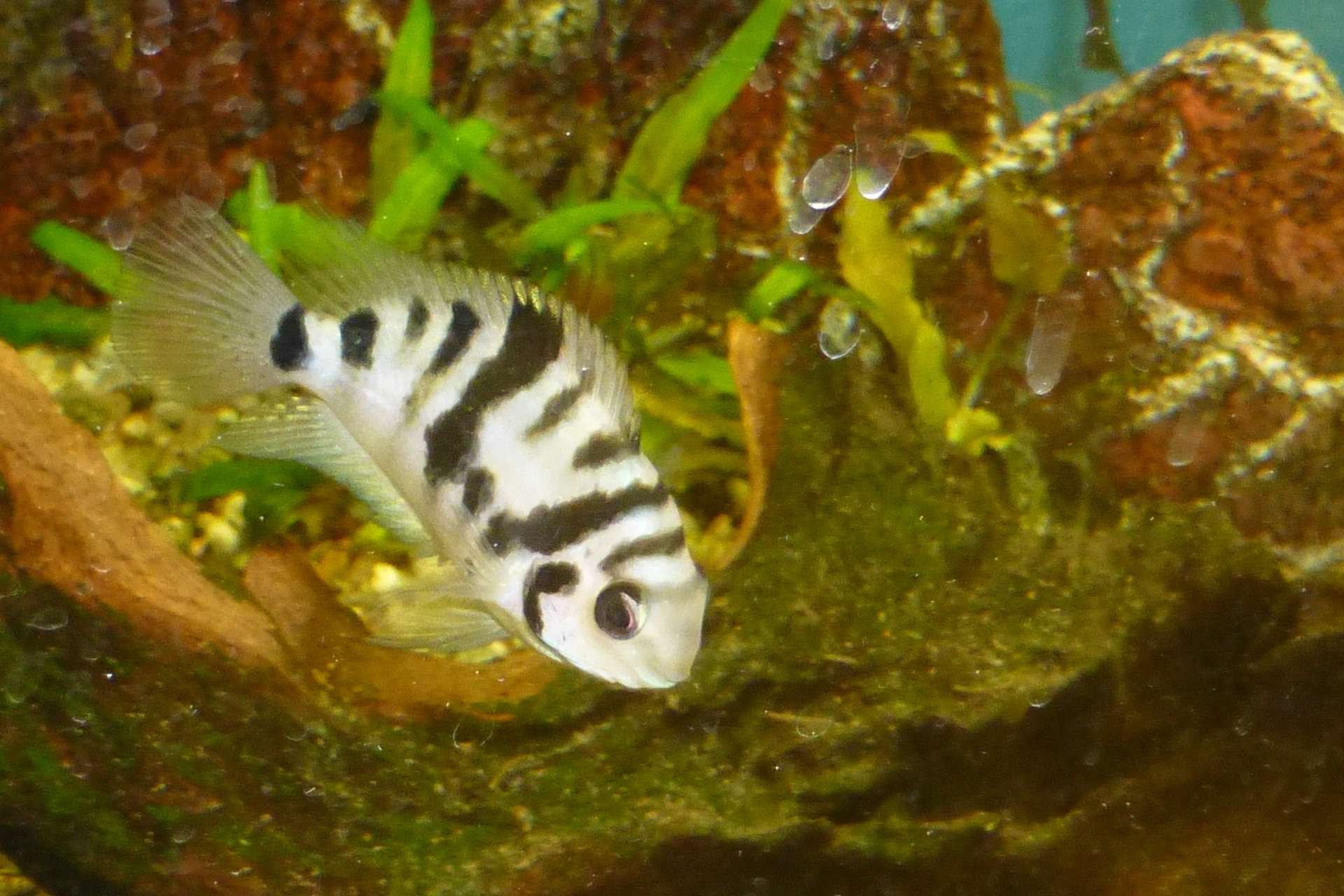

Conservation status
- Data Deficient (IUCN 3.1)

Scientific classification
- Kingdom: Animalia
- Phylum: Chordata
- Class: Actinopterygii
- Order: Cichliformes
- Family: Cichlidae
- Genus: Amatitlania
- Species: A. siquia

Binomial name
- Amatitlania siquia Schmitter-Soto, 2007

= Amatitlania siquia =

Species of fish

Amatitlania siquia is a species of cichlid native to Central America. These cichlid can be identified by black melanin-based stripes in males and an additional bright orange spot on the abdomen for females.

The size and pigmentation of the spots and stripes respectively correlate to proactivity within this cichlid. Darker stripes in males and smaller spots in females are characteristic of more proactive Amatitlania siquia.

Males of this species have been shown to exhibit alternative reproductive tactics (ARTs) by making their physical appearance similar to those of females. Additionally, males that use ARTs have been shown to have Gonadosomatic indices that are 16-fold larger than parental males and 3-fold higher than females.

In 2019, scientists have shown that members of this monogamous species of fish develop a pessimist attitude when their partner is absent.

== See also ==
- Amatitlania
- Cichlid
- Convict cichlid
- The Cichlid Room Companion
