= Ruth Barrett =

British film score composer

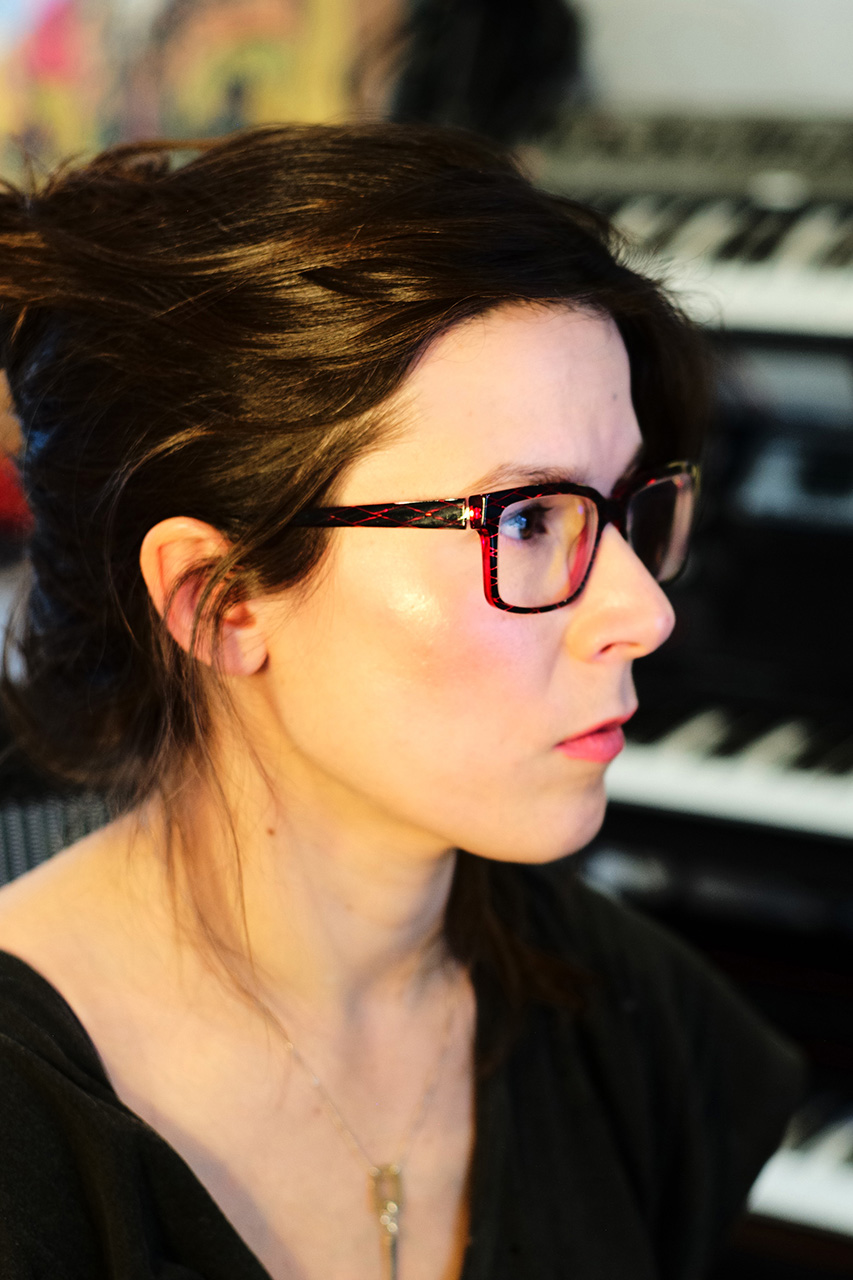
- Barrett at work in her studio (2017)

Background information
- Born: Ruth Barrett; 1976 (age 49–50); Roehampton, London, England
- Genres: Television score, Film score
- Occupation: Composer
- Instrument: Piano
- Years active: 2005–present
- Website: https://www.ruthbarrettmusic.com/

Ruth Barrett (born 1976) is a British film score composer. Her film score credits include Harry Brown, Twenty8k, and City of Tiny Lights. Her television score credits include The Sister, Bloodlands, Bodyguard, The Durrells, Collateral, Legacy, Law & Order: Organized Crime, and Victoria. For her work on Victoria, Barrett was nominated for a Primetime Emmy Award for Outstanding Music Composition for a Series.

== Early life and career ==
Barrett was born in Roehampton, London in 1976. She became interested in film and television music at a very young age while watching 1980s reruns of 1970s American television shows. She cites 1978s The Incredible Hulk, Queen's 1980 Flash Gordon Soundtrack, and a number of commercials broadcast throughout the 1980s as childhood inspirations that piqued her interest in music.

In her early teens she began improvising compositions around classical pieces with piano teacher and early mentor Nigel Crouch.

Ruth went on to study music at Cambridge University, and then music composition at the Royal Academy of Music in London.

She broke into the television industry composing for advertising pitches. Her first full time role was in post-production for ITV, which allowed her to build key relationships with producers and directors, while gaining practical experience composing for documentaries. Barrett also met her future husband, "sound engineer, electronic music aficionado, composer and synth super-geek", Ruskin Williamson while working there.

After leaving ITV, she freelanced at Strongroom Studios where she began working with her future mentor and collaborator Martin Phipps. This allowed her to further her industry experience, develop her contacts, and led directly a commission for her first drama score.

== Works ==
=== Film ===
Year	Film	Director(s)	Writer(s)	Producer(s)
2009	Harry Brown	Daniel Barber	Gary Young	Matthew Vaughn, Kris Thykier, Matthew Brown, Keith Bell
2010	Toast	SJ Clarkson	Lee Hall	Faye Ward
2012	Twenty8k	David Kew, Neil Thompson	Jimmy Dowdall, Paul Abbott	Martin Carr
2015	City of Tiny Lights	Pete Travis	Patrick Neate	Rebecca O'Brien, Ado Yoshizaki Cassuto
2025	The Old Guard 2	Victoria Mahoney	Greg Rucka	David Ellison, Dana Goldberg, Don Granger, Charlize Theron, Beth Kono, AJ Dix, Marc Evans, Gina Prince-Bythewood

=== Television ===
Year	Series	Director(s)	Writer(s)	Producer(s)
2007	True Dare Kiss	Declan O'Dwyer, Jeremy Webb	Debbie Horsefield	Marcus Wilson
2009	The Take	David Drury	Neil Biswas, based on Martina Cole's book	Willow Grylis
2009	Endgame	Pete Travis	Paula Milne	Hal Vogel
2009	Married Single Other	Charles Martin, Declan Lowney	Peter Souter	Radford Neville
2009	Wuthering Heights	Coky Giedroyc	Peter Bowker	Radford Neville
2009	Wallander: The Man Who Smiled	Andy Wilson	Simon Donald, Richard Cottan	Sanne Wohlenberg
2010	Bouquet of Barbed Wire	Ashley Pierce	Guy Andrews	Kate McKerrell
2012	Hunted	SJ Clarkson	Frank Spotnitz	Eliza Mellor
2013	Whitechapel (Series 1, 3 and 4)	SJ Clarkson, John Strickland, Daniel Nettheim, Jon East	Ben Court, Caroline Ip	Marcus Wilson, David Boulter, Patrick Schweitzer
2013	Legacy	Pete Travis	Paula Milne	Rob Bullock
2014	Remember Me	Ashley Pierce	Gwyneth Hughes	Chris Carey
2015	Critical	Jon East	Jed Mercurio	Christopher Hall
2016	Love, Nina	SJ Clarkson	Nick Hornby	Derrin Schlesinger
2017	Victoria (Series 1-3)	Sandra Goldbacher, Olly Blackburn, Lisa James Larsson, Geoff Sax, Daniel O'Hara, Jim Loach	Daisy Goodwin	Paul Frift
2017	Fearless	Pete Travis	Patrick Harbinson	Adrian Sturges
2017	The Durrells (Series 1-4)	Steve Barron, Roger Goldby, Edward Hall, Niall MacCormick	Simon Nye	Christopher Hall
2018	Bodyguard	Thomas Vincent, John Strickland	Jed Mercurio	Priscilla Parish
2018	Collateral	SJ Clarkson	David Hare	SJ Clarkson, Elizabeth Binns
2019	The Durrells	Steve Barron, Roger Goldby, Edward Hall, Niall MacCormick	Simon Nye	Christopher Hall
2019	Sanditon	Olly Blackburn, Lisa Clarke, Charles Sturridge	Georgina Lowe	Andrew Davies
2020	Bloodlands	Pete Travis	Chris Brandon	Christopher Hall
2020	The Sister	Niall MacCormick	Jonathan Curling	Neil Cross
2021	Law & Order: Organized Crime	Fred Berner	Dick Wolf, Ilene Chaiken & Matt Olmstead	Dick Wolf (executive)

== Awards and nominations ==
Primetime Emmy Award

Year	Award	Work	Episode	Nominee(s)	Result	Ref.
2017	Outstanding Music Composition for a Series	Victoria	"Doll 123"	Martin Phipps, Ruth Barrett, and Natalie Holt	Nominated	
