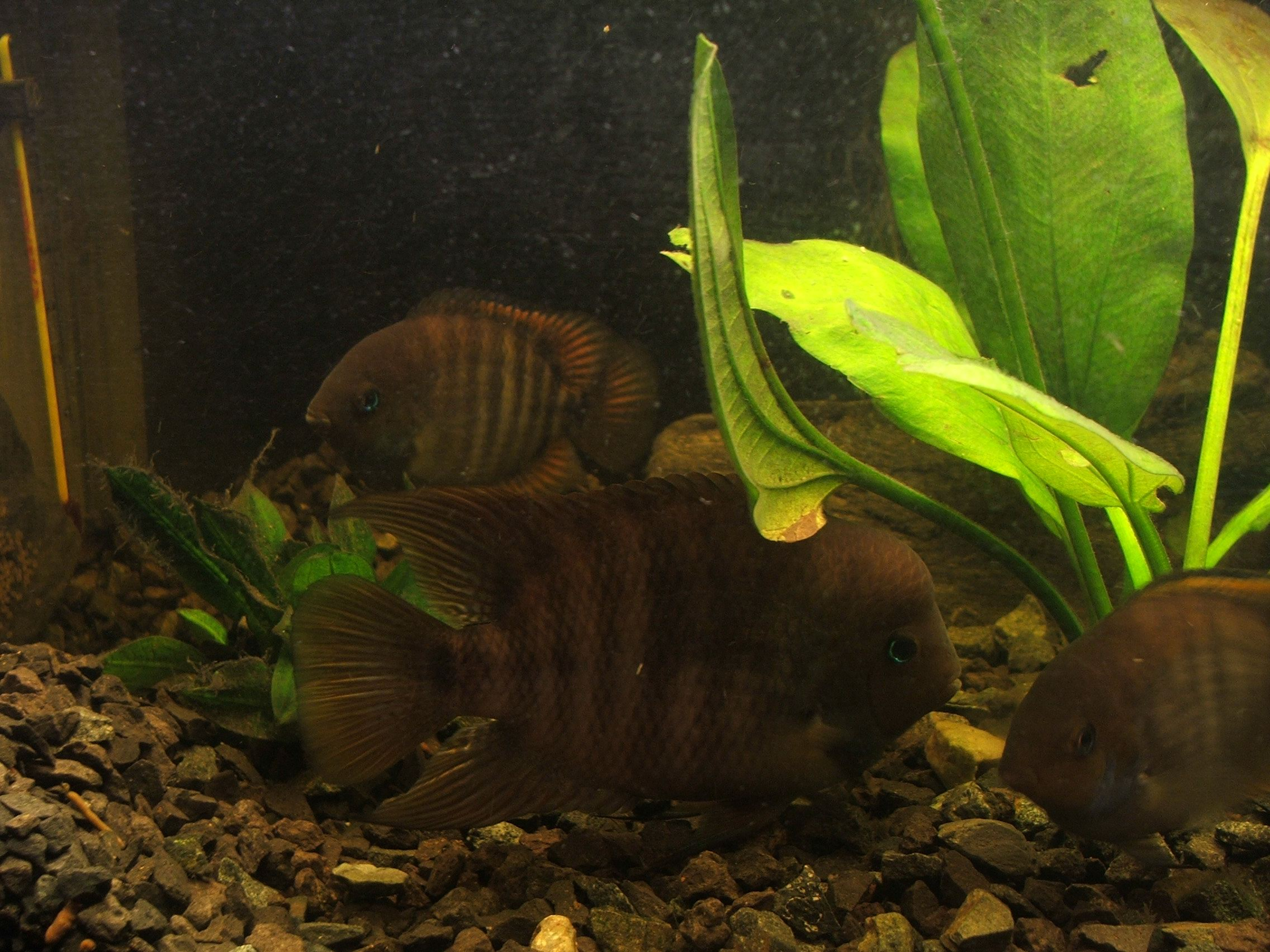
- Cryptoheros sajica

Scientific classification
- Kingdom: Animalia
- Phylum: Chordata
- Class: Actinopterygii
- Division: Teleostei
- Order: Cichliformes
- Family: Cichlidae
- Subfamily: Cichlinae
- Tribe: Heroini
- Genus: Cryptoheros; Allgayer, 2001

Type species
- Heros spilurus Günther, 1862

= Cryptoheros =

Genus of cichlid fishes

Cryptoheros is a genus of small cichlid fishes from Central America and southeast Mexico. They reach up to 13 cm (5.1 in) in length.

== Taxonomy and species ==
The genus formerly contained nine species that had been included within the genus Archocentrus. The convict cichlid has sometimes been placed within the genus Cryptoheros as well, but is now considered a member of the genus Amatitlania. Several other species such as Amatitlania septemfasciata and Amatitlania sajica had also once been included within Cryptoheros.

FishBase currently recognizes four species in this genus:

- Cryptoheros chetumalensis Schmitter-Soto, 2007 – Belize to the Yucatan Peninsula in Mexico
- Cryptoheros cutteri (Fowler, 1932) – Atlantic side of Honduras to Guatemala
- Cryptoheros panamensis (Meek & Hildebrand, 1913) – Atlantic side of Panama
- Cryptoheros spilurus (Günther, 1862) (Blue-eye cichlid) – Lake Izabal drainage in Guatemala

C. panamenis is placed in the subgenus Panamius within Cryptoheros. However, genetic analysis by Říčan, et al. revealed that C. panamensis is not closely related to the other species that are included in Cryptoheros. They recommended that Panamius should be elevated to a full genus, meaning that C. panamensis becomes Panamius panamensis.
