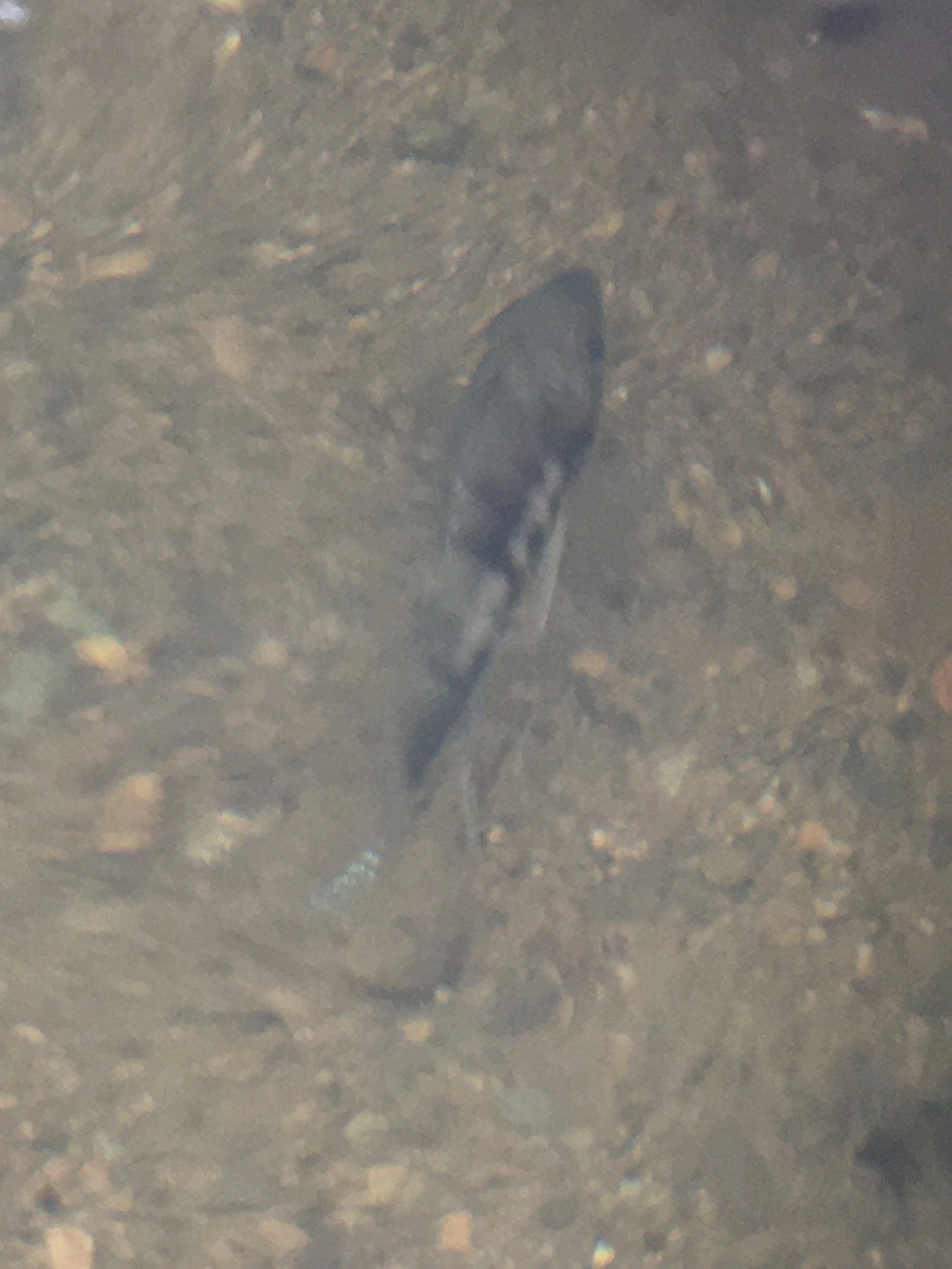

Conservation status
- Near Threatened (IUCN 3.1)

Scientific classification
- Kingdom: Animalia
- Phylum: Chordata
- Class: Actinopterygii
- Order: Cichliformes
- Family: Cichlidae
- Subfamily: Cichlinae
- Tribe: Heroini
- Genus: Panamius; Schmitter-Soto, 2007
- Species: P. panamensis

Binomial name
- Panamius panamensis (Meek & Hildebrand, 1913)

Synonyms
- Archocentrus panamensis; Cryptoheros panamensis; Neetroplus panamensis

= Panamius =

Panamius panamensis

Genus of fishes

Panamius is a genus of cichlid fishes found in moderately flowing rivers and streams in Panama. The only species within Panamius is Panamius panamensis. Panamius had been previously considered a subgenus within the genus Cryptoheros. Prior to being classified within Cryptoheros it was sometimes included within the genus Neetroplus. P. panamensis reaches up to 13 cm (5.1 in) in length and primarily feeds on aufwuchs.
