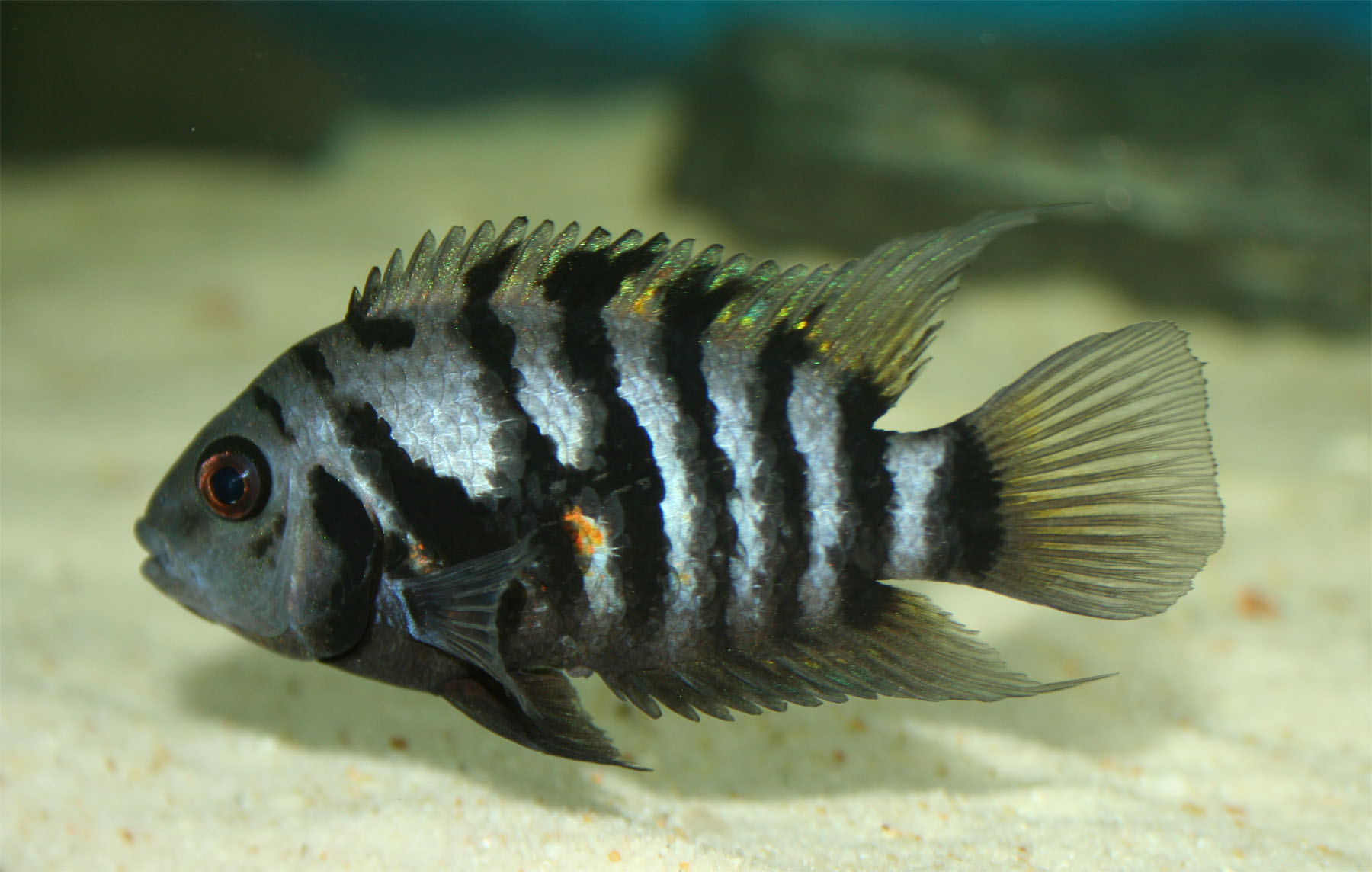
- Amatitlania nigrofasciata

Scientific classification
- Kingdom: Animalia
- Phylum: Chordata
- Class: Actinopterygii
- Division: Teleostei
- Order: Cichliformes
- Family: Cichlidae
- Subfamily: Cichlinae
- Tribe: Heroini
- Genus: Amatitlania; Schmitter-Soto, 2007

Type species
- Amatitlania nigrofasciata Günther, 1867

Synonyms
- Bussingius Schmitter-Soto, 2007

= Amatitlania =

Genus of fishes

Amatitlania is a genus of cichlid fishes native to freshwater habitats in Central America from El Salvador and Guatemala to Panama. They are fairly small cichlids, typically reaching up to 6.4–10 cm (2.5–4 in) in standard length depending on exact species, although captives may grow larger.

Several Amatitlania species are regularly kept in aquariums, especially the convict cichlids, which are aggressively territorial, but some others in the genus are less pugnacious. Some Amatitlania species have small ranges and are considered threatened, primarily due to habitat loss and pollution. Six are regarded as priority species in the CARES program, which aims to ensure their survival through captive breeding.

== Taxonomy and species ==
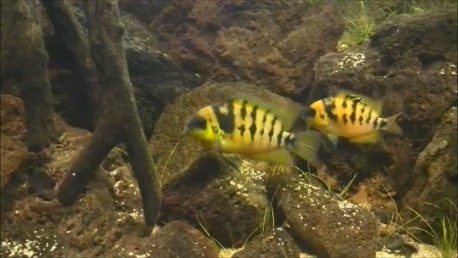
Amatitlania nanolutea, one of the smallest Central American cichlids

Amatitlania is closely related to Archocentrus and Cryptoheros, and among others contains the convict cichlids that were previously placed in those genera. The genus was erected by Juan Schmitter-Soto in 2007 based on a study of the Archocentrus complex. A 2008 study led by Oldřich Říčan has suggested that all the species in Cryptoheros and Amatitlania should be moved into the genus Hypsophrys.

There are currently 9 recognized species in Amatitlania:

- Amatitlania altoflava (Allgayer 2001)
- Amatitlania coatepeque Schmitter-Soto, 2007
- Amatitlania kanna Schmitter-Soto, 2007
- Amatitlania myrnae (Loiselle, 1997)
- Amatitlania nanolutea (Allgayer, 1994)
- Amatitlania nigrofasciata (Günther, 1867) (Convict cichlid)
- Amatitlania septemfasciata (Regan, 1908)
- Amatitlania sajica (Bussing, 1974)
- Amatitlania siquia Schmitter-Soto, 2007 (Honduran red point cichlid)

Amatitlania can be subdivided into a few different groups, each containing very closely related species. The convict cichlid group includes the main species itself, A. nigrofasciata, as well as A. coatepeque, A. kanna and A. siquia. A taxonomic review found that A. coatepeque is indistinguishable from A. nigrofasciata (whose distribution entirely surrounds Lake Coatepeque, the locality of A. coatepeque), leading to the recommendation of regarding the former as a junior synonym of the latter. Whether the two others in this group, A. kanna and A. siquia, are sufficiently distinct to be regarded as separate species from A. nigrofasciata remains unclear. A similar issue exists for the separation of A. altoflava from A. nanoluteus.
