= NEAT =

NEAT may refer to:

== Science and technology ==
- Near-Earth Asteroid Tracking, a program run by NASA and the JPL to discover near-Earth objects
- Neuroevolution of augmenting topologies, a genetic algorithm for the generation of evolving artificial neural networks
- NEAT chipset, a three-chip chipset for IBM PC compatible computers. The acronym stands for "New Enhanced Advanced Technology."
- Non-exercise activity thermogenesis, a way of heat production in organisms
- National Electronic Autocoding Technique, a language for NCR 315 computers

== Other uses ==
- NRLA (German abbreviation NEAT), the New Railway Link through the Alps
- North European Aerospace Test range, an organisation operating rocket test ranges in Sweden
- Northeast Asia Trade Tower, an office building in South Korea
- New England Air Transport, an airline operating in Maine from 2008 to 2009
- National Exchange for Automated Trading, the trading system of the National Stock Exchange of India
- National English Ability Test, a Korean standardized test of ability in English

== See also ==
- Neat (disambiguation)
- Neet (disambiguation)
