= Amatitlania coatepeque =

Scientific classification
- Kingdom: Animalia
- Phylum: Chordata
- Class: Actinopterygii
- Order: Cichliformes
- Family: Cichlidae
- Genus: Amatitlania
- Species: A. coatepeque

Binomial name
- Amatitlania coatepeque Schmitter-Soto, 2007

Freshwater fish species

Amatitlania coatepeque, the Lago Coatepeque convict cichlid, is a species of freshwater ray-finned fish belonging to the family Cichlidae, the cichlids. This fish is endemic to El Salvador.

== Taxonomy ==
Amatitlania coatepeque was first formally described in 2007 by the Mexican ichthyologist Juan Jacobo Schmitter-Soto with its type locality given as off the north shore of the island in Lake Coatepeque, El Salvador. In 2014 it was suggested that this taxon was a junior synonym of the type species of the genus Amatitlania, A. nigrofasciata. However, the consensus still treats this as a valid species. The genus Amatitlania is classified in the tribe Heroini within the subfamily Cichlinae, the American cichlids, in the family Cichildaeof the family Cichlidae, within the order Cichliformes.

== Etymology ==
Amatitlania coatepeque is classified within the genus Amatitlania, this name means "of Amatitlan", i.e. Lake Amatitlán, a caldera lake in Guatemala which is the type locality of A. nigrofasciatia. The specific name, coatepeque, is the name of the only known location for this species, the caldera lake of Lake Coatepeque in EL Salvador. The name of this lake is thought to be Nahuatl, combining, coátl, meaning "snake", and tepétl, which means "mountain", giving a toponym that translates as "mountain of the snake".

== Description ==
Amatitlania coatepeque has a short, deep body with a maximum standard length of 9.1 cm (3.6 in). There are 17 to 19 spines and 7 to 9 soft rays in the dorsal fin, while the anal fin contains 8 to 10 spines and 6 or 7 soft rays. The body has vertical bars along the flanks and, in this species, the fourth bar is in a Y-shape, as the 4th and 5th bars merge on the lower side. Most species in the genus Amatitlania have 5 or fewer scales in the lateral line, this species has at least 5.

== Distribution and habitat ==
Amatitlania coatepeque is restricted to Lake Coatepeque in El Salavdor where it lives among rocks in clear water.
