= Chris Brandon (writer) =

British writer behind TV series Bloodlands

Chris Brandon is a British television screenwriter, producer and actor. He is best known as the creator and writer of the BBC series Bloodlands.

== Early life and education ==
Brandon was born in Salisbury, Wiltshire, to a Northern Irish father and an English mother. He was educated at Rockport School in Northern Ireland before returning to England at 13. He studied English at Trinity College Dublin and acting at the London Academy of Music and Dramatic Art.

== Career ==
After graduating as an actor in 2006, Brandon worked predominantly in theatre with roles at the Royal Exchange, Manchester, Sheffield Crucible, Shakespeare's Globe, Royal Lyceum Theatre, Bush Theatre, Theatre503, Finborough Theatre, Wilton's Music Hall and the Soho Theatre. His acting work on screen includes playing Alexander Reece in Endeavour. Brandon's last acting job was playing the music impresario Larry Page, manager of the Kinks, in Joe Penhall's Sunny Afternoon, at the Harold Pinter Theatre, in London's West End.

In 2015, Brandon started writing on Red Rock.

In 2017, Brandon's speculative pilot script for Bloodlands was picked up by Jed Mercurio and became the first show to be produced by Hat Trick Mercurio Television. The show is a police thriller set in Northern Ireland. Series 1 first aired in 2021, to an average of 8.2 million viewers. Series 2 aired in 2022. Brandon wrote all 10 episodes of the two seasons.

In 2024 it was announced that he would take over as the lead writer on the third season of Trigger Point, starring Vicky McClure, and on the fourth season, confirmed in 2025.

Other works by Brandon include the 2021 Audible Originals thriller, Zoetrope, starring Daisy Ridley, and the 2025 political thriller Discretion, which he co-wrote with Davy Banks, as part of the BBC's Limelight series.

== Personal life ==
Brandon lives in north London.
