= Neet =

Neet or NEET may refer to:

- National Eligibility cum Entrance Test (Undergraduate) (NEET-UG), a medical entrance exam in India
- National Eligibility cum Entrance Test (Postgraduate) (NEET–PG), a medical entrance exam in India
- NEET, an acronym for "not in education, employment, or training"
- Neet (fish), also known as poor man's tropheus
- N.E.E.T. Recordings, a record label
- Neet, a former name of the depilatory product Veet
- River Neet, a tributary in Cornwall, England
- Neet Mohan (born 1985), an English actor
- Daniel Neet, American singer

== See also ==
- Neet Covered Bridge
- Neat (disambiguation)
- NEAT (disambiguation)
