= Twelve Bar Blues (novel) =

2001 novel by Patrick Neate

- First edition
- Author: Patrick Neate
- Language: English
- Genre: Historical novel
- Publisher: Viking Press
- Publication date: 2001
- Publication place: United Kingdom
- Media type: Print (Hardback & Paperback)
- Pages: 416
- ISBN: 0-670-88791-9
- OCLC: 49394577

Twelve Bar Blues is a 2001 novel by Patrick Neate, and the winner of that year's Whitbread novel award.

The story is essentially about two people who share a common history - Fortis 'Lick' Holden, a cornet player in early 20th Century New Orleans, and Sylvia Di Napoli, a retired prostitute living in modern-day London, who is searching for her ancestry. Louis Armstrong is also featured in the novel.
