= Omagh (film) =

- Written by: Paul Greengrass; Guy Hibbert
- Directed by: Pete Travis
- Starring: Gerard McSorley; Michele Forbes; Brenda Fricker; Stuart Graham
- Country of origin: Ireland
- Original language: English

Production
- Producers: Paul Greengrass; Ed Guiney
- Cinematography: Donal Gilligan
- Editor: Clive Barrett
- Running time: 106 minutes
- Production companies: Tiger Aspect Productions; Hell's Kitchen International

Original release
- Network: RTÉ
- Release: 22 May 2004
- Network: Channel 4
- Release: 27 May 2004

Omagh is a 2004 Irish film dramatising the events surrounding the Omagh bombing and its aftermath, co-produced by Irish state broadcaster RTÉ and UK network Channel 4, and directed by Pete Travis. It was first shown on television in both countries in May 2004.

Michael Gallagher, whose son Aiden (Paul Kelly) was killed in the bombing, is played by Gerard McSorley, originally from Omagh. Out of respect for the residents of the town, it was filmed on location in Navan, County Meath, Republic of Ireland. The film ends with the Julie Miller song Broken Things, which was performed by local singer Juliet Turner at the memorial for the victims of the Omagh bombing.

== Reception ==
Rotten Tomatoes reported that 88% of critics gave the film positive reviews, with an average score of 7.2/10, however this is based upon a sample of only 8 reviews.

Critics particularly noted the gritty realism and powerful acting in the film. In his review, Scott Foundas of Variety said that it "serves as a companion piece to writer producer Paul Greengrass' superb 2001 pic Bloody Sunday, but emerges as a startlingly powerful achievement in its own right".

== Awards ==
The film won a number of awards. Most notably, it won the 2005 BAFTA TV Award for Best Single Drama. It also won a 'Discovery Award' at the 2004 Toronto International Film Festival. At the Irish Film and Television Awards, the film won the awards for 'Best Irish Film' and 'Best Actor (Gerard McSorley)', and was nominated for a further five awards, including 'Best Film Director', 'Best Script' and 'Best Actress' for Michele Forbes.
