= City of Tiny Lights =

2016 British crime thriller film

- UK theatrical release poster
- Directed by: Pete Travis
- Written by: Patrick Neate
- Based on: City of Tiny Lights by Patrick Neate
- Produced by: Ado Yoshizaki Cassuto; Rebecca O'Brien
- Starring: Riz Ahmed; Cush Jumbo; James Floyd; Billie Piper; Roshan Seth
- Cinematography: Felix Wiedemann
- Edited by: David Charap
- Music by: Ruth Barrett
- Production companies: Icon Productions; BBC Films; NDF International; Sixteen Films; BFI; Lipsync Productions; Fel-UK; Fernden Productions; Ingenious Media; Protagonist Pictures
- Distributed by: Icon Film Distribution
- Release dates: 12 September 2016 (TIFF); 7 April 2017 (United Kingdom)
- Running time: 110 minutes
- Country: United Kingdom
- Language: English

City of Tiny Lights is a 2016 British crime thriller film directed by Pete Travis and written by Patrick Neate, based on his own 2005 novel of the same name. It stars Riz Ahmed, Cush Jumbo, James Floyd, Billie Piper and Roshan Seth. Set in London, it tells the story of a private detective who investigates the disappearance of a Russian prostitute. The film had its world premiere in the Special Presentations section at the 2016 Toronto International Film Festival on 12 September 2016. It was released in the United Kingdom on 7 April 2017.

== Plot ==
Tommy Akhtar, the son of Ugandan immigrants, works as a snoop in London. Melody Chase visits him to ask him to look for her missing roommate Natasha, a Russian prostitute. Tommy steals a keycard from the cleaning staff and sneaks into the hotel room where she met her last client but only finds the dead body of Usman Rana, a British Pakistani businessman. Tommy takes the dead man's mobile phone as evidence, calls the police with an anonymous tip about the murder from a payphone at a bar, and has the phone's PIN cracked by Avid, a young weed dealer whose mother wants Tommy to help him get out of trouble. Two of the last calls made from the phone were to Hafiz "Lovely" Ansari, a childhood friend of Tommy's, to discuss an investment. Tommy visits him at his home and Lovely asks him to investigate the matter because the murder is scaring away other investors.

Tommy learns from a police contact that by the time the police arrived the room had been cleaned and the hotel was crawling with SO15. The SIM card in the phone is decrypted and found to contain a spreadsheet documenting large donations to the Islamic Youth League. Tommy visits the organisation and is photographed doing so by the SO15. The leader of the organisation indicates that Usman's death was the will of Allah as punishment for the false idols and lustful desires of Western society. After leaving, Tommy is approached by an American federal agent in a bar who tells him that he knows that Tommy was at the hotel and that he called in the anonymous tip and warns Tommy to stay away from the investigation. Tommy speaks with Tunde, one of the men working at Natasha's club the night she was last seen, and learns that Melody was with one of her regular clients there the night of the murder. As he leaves he is assaulted by two strangers who scream that the case is closed before fleeing.

Tommy begins sending Avid to the Islamic Youth League to gather information. Tommy is abducted in a black van and taken to speak with the federal agent, who shows him a video of Usman calling for jihad and takes him to a crime scene to show him the freshly discovered body of Natasha. Tommy returns to Melody and confronts her. She says that she is being followed and confesses that the customer with her the night of the murder was Hafiz. As they are leaving, a stranger shoots at them from the elevator. They escape to Tommy's father's house, where Tommy looks at the spreadsheet and discovers large profits being made from property acquisitions at low prices. The next day Mullah Al-Dabaran, the leader of the Islamic Youth League, is arrested. His followers protest in demonstrations demanding his release, where Hafiz attempts to calm them. Tommy warns Hafiz that the people from the night of the murder are being killed. When Avid is attacked by American federal agents and put into a coma, Avid's mother blames Tommy for getting him involved.

Tommy returns home, where he finds Hafiz and another man holding Melody prisoner at gunpoint. Hafiz confesses to using drug dealers to bring property prices down then allowing the Islamic Youth League to run off the drug dealers to enable him to buy the properties at a low price. Tommy's father returns and shoots the gunman, but Tommy is able manage to help convinces him to not also shoot Hafiz. Hafiz is then arrested.

In the closing scene, Tommy returns home to eat with his father, Melody, Avid, Shelley and Emma.

== Cast ==
- Riz Ahmed as Tommy Akhtar
  - Reiss Kershi-Hussain as Young Tommy Akhtar
- Roshan Seth as Farzad Akhtar
- Ram John Holder as Trinidad Pete
- Cush Jumbo as Melody Chase
- Miriam Acharki as Mrs Elbaz
- Mohammad Ali Amiri as Avid Elbaz
- Pablo Raybould as Brian
- Branko Tomovic as Big John
- Billie Piper as Shelley
  - Hannah Rae as Young Shelley / Emma
- George Sargeant as Stuart Southern
- Charlotte Blake as Jones
- James Floyd as Hafiz "Lovely" Ansari
  - Antonio Aakeel as Young Lovely
- Torin Pocock as Barman
- Danny Webb as DS Cal Donnelly
- Damson Idris as Hakim
- Alexander Siddig as Al-Dabaran
- Benjamin Leefar as Spook
- Vincent Regan as Tall Man / Agent Schaeffer
- Barry Aird as Jerry Quinn
- Jake Fairbrother as Tunde
- Grace Calder as Girl at club
- Elroy Anthony as Cafe proprietor
- Dean Phillips as Rana
- Aouxe as Natasha
- Harry Lawtey as Charlie Benson
- Adam Gibbs as News reporter
- Sofia Ben Achour as Doctor
- Ann Gabrielle as The queen
- Deepak Verma as Asif Ansari

== Production ==
On 21 April 2015, it was announced that Pete Travis would be directing a London-set crime film City of Tiny Lights based on the 2005 novel of same name by Patrick Neate, who also adapted the novel into the film. Riz Ahmed was attached to play the lead role of a British detective Tommy Akhtar, and Billie Piper to play Akhtar's long-lost love, Shelley, while the other cast would include James Floyd, Cush Jumbo and Roshan Seth. BBC Films and BFI developed the script and would finance the film in association with Lip Sync Productions, Fel UK and Ingenious Media. Ado Yoshizaki Cassuto and Rebecca O'Brien would be producing the film for NDF International and Sixteen Films. Protagonist Pictures would handle the international rights while Icon Film Distribution would release the film in the UK and Ireland.

Principal photography on the film began on 27 April 2015 in London and lasted for six weeks.

== Release ==
The film had its world premiere in the Special Presentations section at the 2016 Toronto International Film Festival on 12 September 2016. It was released in the United Kingdom on 7 April 2017.

== Reception ==
On Rotten Tomatoes, the film holds an approval rating of 59% based on 41 reviews, with an average rating of 5.53/10. Metacritic assigned the film a weighted average score of 55 out of 100, based on 12 critics, indicating "mixed or average reviews".

Catherine Bray of Variety wrote, "Though pleasant enough to watch, there's something not fully realized about the final product here." David Rooney of The Hollywood Reporter commented that "City of Tiny Lights exerts tension throughout and remains intriguing in its use of terrorism anxiety and anti-Muslim prejudice as fodder for hasty conclusions." Radheyan Simonpillai of Now praised Riz Ahmed's performance, writing, "Ahmed gives a stellar, attentive performance, his eyes darting about to catch the details in every scene."
