= Neat =

Neat may refer to:

- Neat (bartending), a single, unmixed liquor served in a rocks glass
- Neat, an old term for horned oxen
  - Neatsfoot oil, a yellow oil rendered and purified from the shin bones and feet of cattle, derived from the foregoing
- Neat Records, a British record label
- Neuroevolution of augmenting topologies (NEAT), a genetic algorithm (GA) for the generation of evolving artificial neural networks
- Non-exercise activity thermogenesis, a concept in human energy expenditure

== See also ==
- Neet (disambiguation)
- NEAT (disambiguation)
- "Neat Neat Neat"
- Neate, a surname
