= Francis Neate =

English cricketer and lawyer

Personal information
- Full name: Francis Webb Neate
- Born: 13 May 1940 (age 86); Newbury, Berkshire, England
- Batting: Right-handed
- Role: Berkshire president
- Relatives: Patrick Neate (brother)

Domestic team information
- Years: Team
- 1960–1962: Oxford University
- 1958–1979: Berkshire

Career statistics
Competition	FC	List A
Matches	17	4
Runs scored	914	57
Batting average	38.08	14.25
100s/50s	1/6	0/0
Top score	112	38
Catches/stumpings	7/–	2/–
- Source: Cricinfo, 20 September 2010

Francis Webb Neate (born 13 May 1940) is a former English cricketer and a lawyer who served as president of the International Bar Association in 2005 and 2006.

== Cricket career ==
Neate was born at Newbury, Berkshire. He attended St Paul's School, London, where he captained the First XI in 1958, before going up to Brasenose College, Oxford.

A right-handed batsman, Neate made his first-class debut for Oxford University against the Free Foresters in 1960. From 1960 to 1962, he represented the University in 17 first-class matches, and won a Blue by playing in the University Match against Cambridge University in both 1961 and 1962. A successful batsman for the University, Neate scored 914 runs at a batting average of 38.08, with six half centuries and a single century of 112 against Hampshire in 1961. In 11 matches for Oxford in 1961 he scored 712 runs at an average of 54.76.

Neate made his Minor Counties Championship debut for Berkshire in 1958 against Cornwall. From 1958 to 1979, he represented the county in 135 Minor Counties Championship matches, the last of which came in the 1979 Championship when Berkshire played Devon. Neate was the Berkshire captain from 1971 to 1975. He played for the Minor Counties in a two-day match against the Australians in 1961, scoring 72 in the second innings.

He also played four List-A matches for Berkshire. His List-A debut came against Somerset in the 1965 Gillette Cup, and his final List-A match was in the 1979 Gillette Cup when Berkshire played Durham at Green Lane Cricket Ground in Durham. In 1962, he played for Surrey Second XI in the Second XI Championship.

Neate is the President of Berkshire County Cricket Club.

== Law career ==
After graduating from Oxford with a BA in Jurisprudence, Neate studied at the University of Chicago Law School, gaining a JD. He joined the London law firm Slaughter and May in 1964 and worked there until 1997. He worked for Schroders as Group Legal Adviser from 1997 to 2004 and as Counsel for Kirkland & Ellis from 2004 to 2009.

He was president of the International Bar Association in 2005 and 2006. During his term he launched a global campaign to garner support for the adherence to, and advancement of, the rule of law, noting that the rule of law "is now under threat – even in those countries where previously respect for the Rule of Law seems to have been well established". He received the 2011 City of London Law Society Lifetime Achievement Award "in recognition of his long and distinguished legal career".

Neate was, from 1986 to 1997, the principal legal adviser to the Test and County Cricket Board, the predecessor of the England and Wales Cricket Board, which he helped to establish in 1996. He conducted almost all the Board's legal work for eleven years.

Neate's publications include the book The Rule of Law: Perspectives from Around the Globe (LexisNexis, 2009), of which he is general editor.

== Family ==
Neate married Patricia Mulligan in 1962. They have two daughters and two sons, including social policy expert Polly Neate and novelist Patrick Neate.

His younger brother Patrick played a single first-class match for Oxford University in 1966, as well as Minor Counties cricket for Berkshire from 1964 to 1979. Their father, also called Francis Webb Neate, played Minor Counties cricket for Berkshire in 1932 and 1933.
