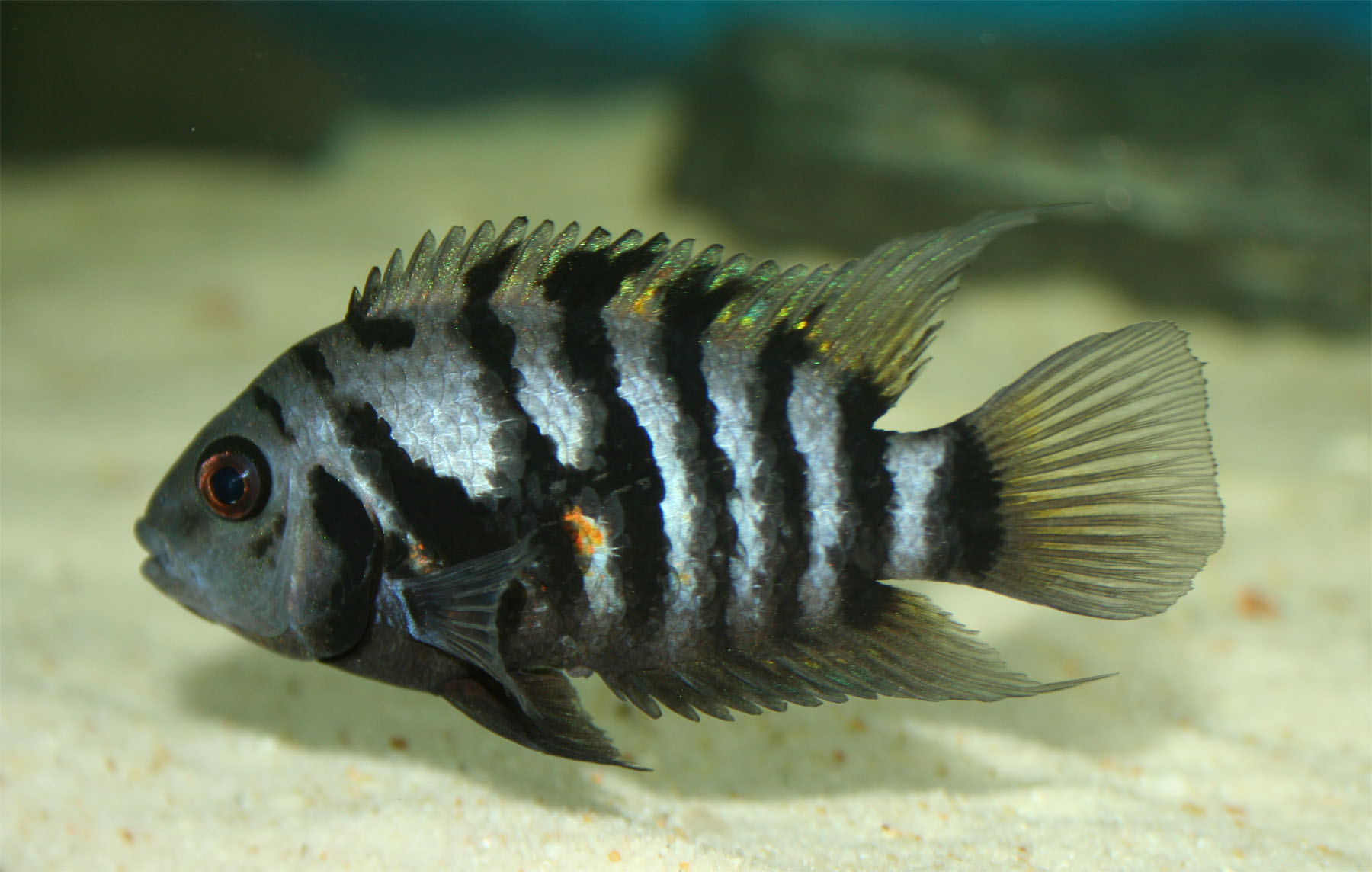

Conservation status
- Data Deficient (IUCN 3.1)

- Secure (NatureServe)

Scientific classification
- Kingdom: Animalia
- Phylum: Chordata
- Class: Actinopterygii
- Order: Cichliformes
- Family: Cichlidae
- Genus: Amatitlania
- Species: A. nigrofasciata

Binomial name
- Amatitlania nigrofasciata (Günther, 1867)

Synonyms
- List: Heros nigrofasciatus Günther, 1867; Archocentrus nigrofasciatus (Günther, 1867); Cichlasoma nigrofasciatum (Günther, 1867); Cryptoheros nigrofasciatus (Günther, 1867)

= Convict cichlid =

Species of fish

The convict cichlid (Amatitlania nigrofasciata) is a fish species from the family Cichlidae, native to Central America, also known as the zebra cichlid. Convict cichlids are popular aquarium fish and have also been the subject of numerous studies on fish behaviour.

== Taxonomy ==
Albert Günther originally described the species in 1867 after Frederick DuCane Godman and Osbert Salvin collected specimens in Central America. In 2007, the species was moved from the genus Archocentrus to a new genus, Amatitlania, based on Juan Schmitter-Soto's study of Archocentus species. However, a 2008 study led by Oldřich Říčan proposed moving the species in Cryptoheros and Amatitlania, including Amatitlania nigrofasciata into the genus Hypsophrys.

The convict cichlid, as traditionally defined, displays significant color variations across its range. Some of these regional variants are now considered different species. One of these is A. siquia, the Honduran red point cichlid or Honduran red point convict, which ranges from the Atlantic slope of Honduras south to Costa Rica. Two other species formerly included in A. nigrofasciata are A. kanna from Panama's Atlantic slope, and A. coatepeque from Lake Coatepeque in El Salvador; however, the latter is indistinguishable from A. nigrofasciata, leading to the recommendation of regarding it as a junior synonym.

The type species, A. nigrofasciata, which used to cover all these species, is restricted to the northern population ranging from El Salvador to Guatemala on the Pacific slope and from Honduras to Guatemala on the Atlantic slope.

A number of synonyms exist for this species including: Archocentrus nigrofasciatus, Cichlasoma nigrofasciatum, Cryptoheros nigrofasciatus and Heros nigrofasciatus.

=== Etymology ===
The common name convict cichlid is, like the species name, derived from the vertical black stripes on the body which are reminiscent of the striped prison uniforms of British convicts. Similarly, the species epithet nigrofasciatus literally means "black-striped".

== Description ==
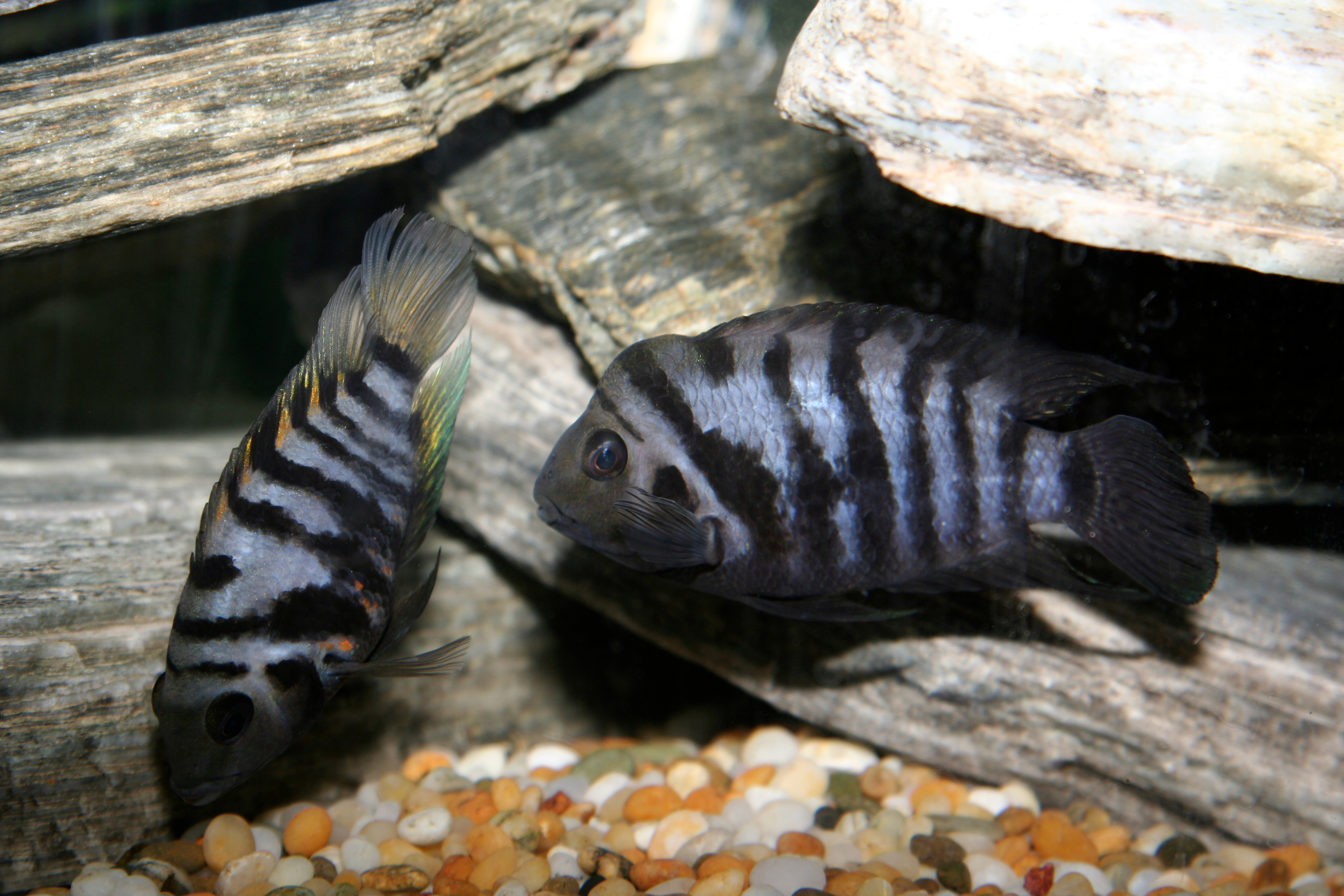
Male (right) and female (left)

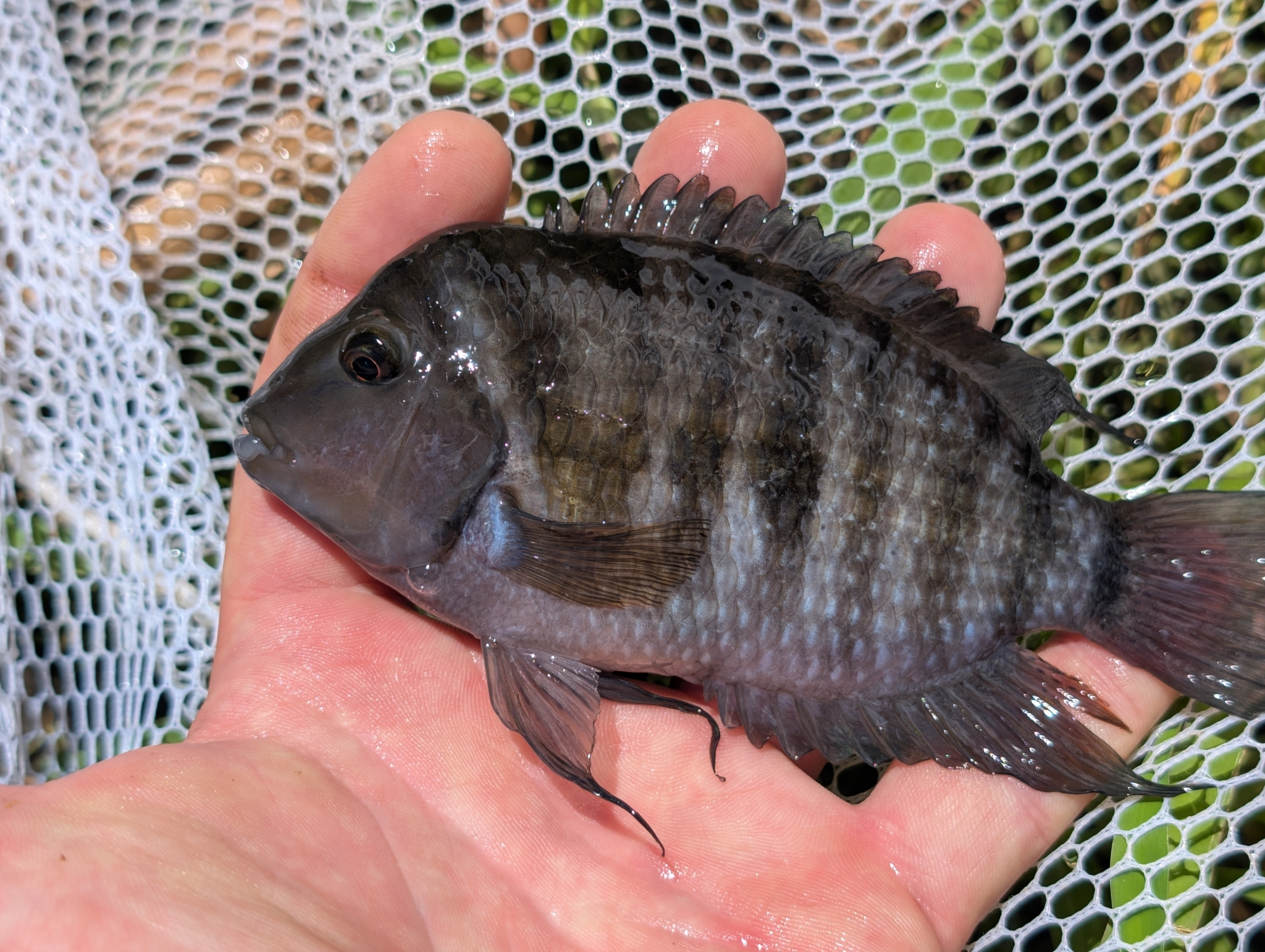
Male in O'ahu, showing a nuchal hump

The wild-type of the species has 8 or 9 black vertical bars on a blue-grey body, along with a dark blotch on the operculum. Juvenile convict cichlids are monomorphic until they reach sexual maturity. The male is mostly gray with light black stripes along the body. Males are larger than females, and they have more pointed ventral, dorsal and anal fins which often extend into filaments. In addition, older males frequently develop vestigial fatty lumps on their foreheads. Unusually for fish, the female is more highly coloured. She has more intense black bands across the body, and pink to orange colouration in the ventral region and on the dorsal fin. The maximum standard length has been reported to be 10 centimeters, with total length near 12 centimeters (4.7 in). The body weight of the fish is about 34–36 grams (1.2–1.3 oz). Selective breeding has resulted in a leucistic strain, which lacks the dark barring of the wild type. These are known commonly as white convicts, pink convicts, gold convicts, and A. nigrofasciata "Kongo". The leucistic colouration is caused by a mutation in an autosomal gene and is recessively inherited.

== Range and habitat ==
Convict cichlids are native to the lakes and streams of Central America. In particular, the species occurs along the eastern coast of Central America from Guatemala to Costa Rica, and on the western coast from Honduras to Panama. Convict cichlids prefer moving water, and are most frequently found in habitats with cover in the form of rocks or sunken branches. At four natural habitats of the convict cichlid in Costa Rica, the pH was found to range from 6.6–7.8, while carbonate hardness (KH) ranged from 63 to 77 ppm CaCO_{3}. The daily water temperature ranged from 26–29 °C (79–84 °F). Convict cichlids can be relatively tolerant of cool water, allowing them to colonise volcanic lakes at elevations of 1,500 meters (4,900 ft).

=== Feral populations ===
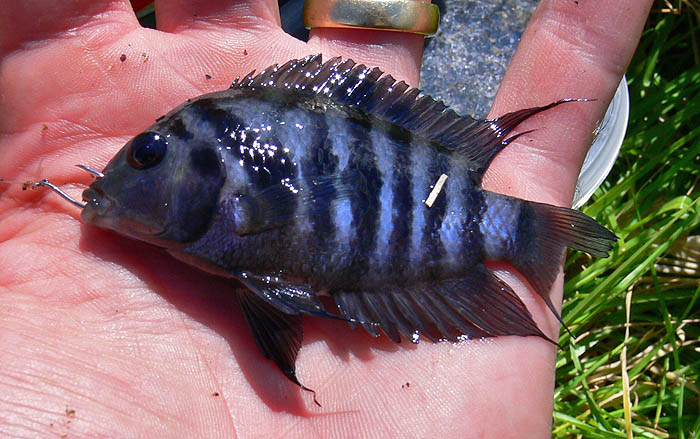
Male caught on a hook and line, in the heated outflow of a coal powerplant in Victoria, Australia.

The species also occurs outside its natural range, even being found in Australia, where it can be found in the warm effluent of power stations in Victoria, and in tropical Queensland. It has also been captured in Perth, Western Australia, although this initial capture also resulted in its eradication. In addition to Australia, the species has been introduced to Réunion, Japan, Mexico, Colombia, Taiwan, and the USA.

== Feeding ==
In natural habitats, the species has an omnivorous diet composed of plants, algae and various prey including small fish, crustaceans, insects and worms. The fish can protrude its jaw 4.2% of its standard length, allowing it to have a varied diet. Inferior social status and associated stress can affect digestive function in convict cichlids.

== Reproduction ==
=== Life cycle ===
The convict cichlid can reach sexual maturity as young as 16 weeks, though sexual maturity more commonly occurs at 6 months. Sexually mature convicts form monogamous pairs and spawn in small caves or crevices. In the wild, the fish excavate caves by moving earth from underneath large stones. Females adhere eggs to the walls of the cave.

Like most cichlids, such as Oreochromis mossambicus, convicts brood (exhibit parental care of) both eggs and free-swimming fry. The eggs hatch approximately 72 hours after fertilization. Until that time the parents expel intruders and potential egg predators from around the nest. They also fan the eggs, moving water with their fins over the clutch to provide oxygenation. They fan the eggs both day and night; at night they use their sense of smell to recognize the presence of the eggs in the dark, and they keep their pelvic fins in contact with the eggs to remain at the right distance for fanning. In darkness the pair recognizes each other and detect predators using their sense of smell.

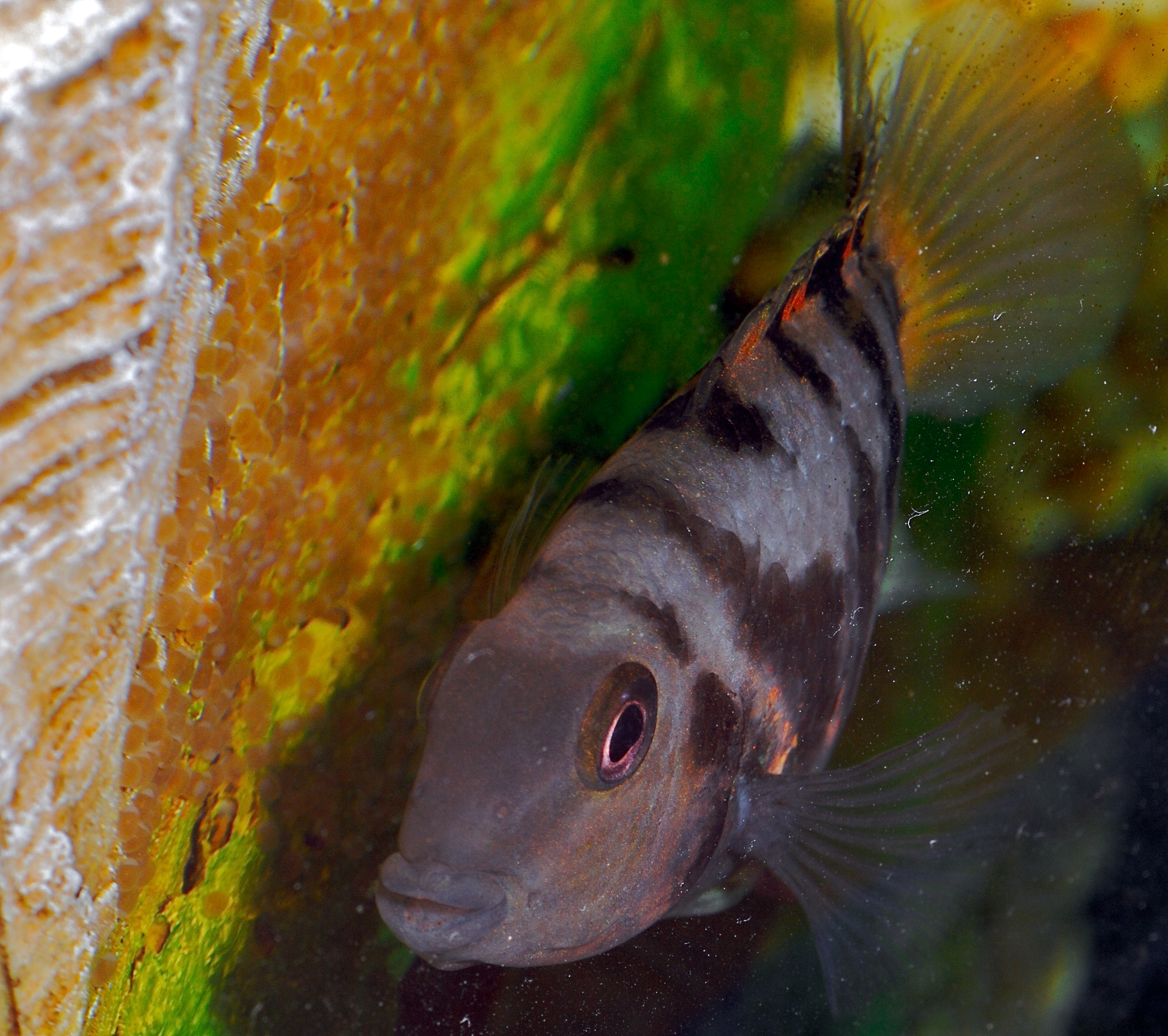
Female with eggs

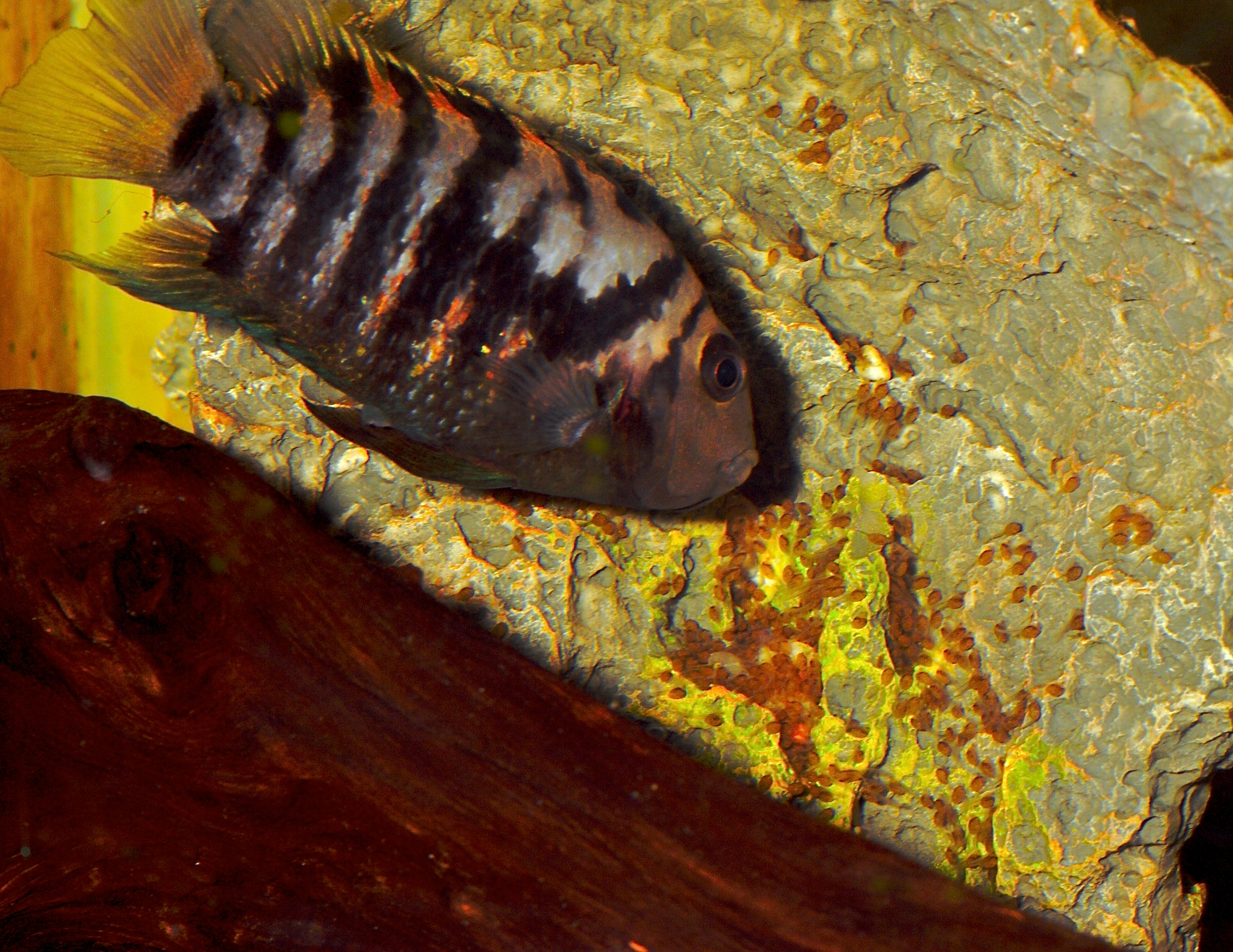
1 day old larvae

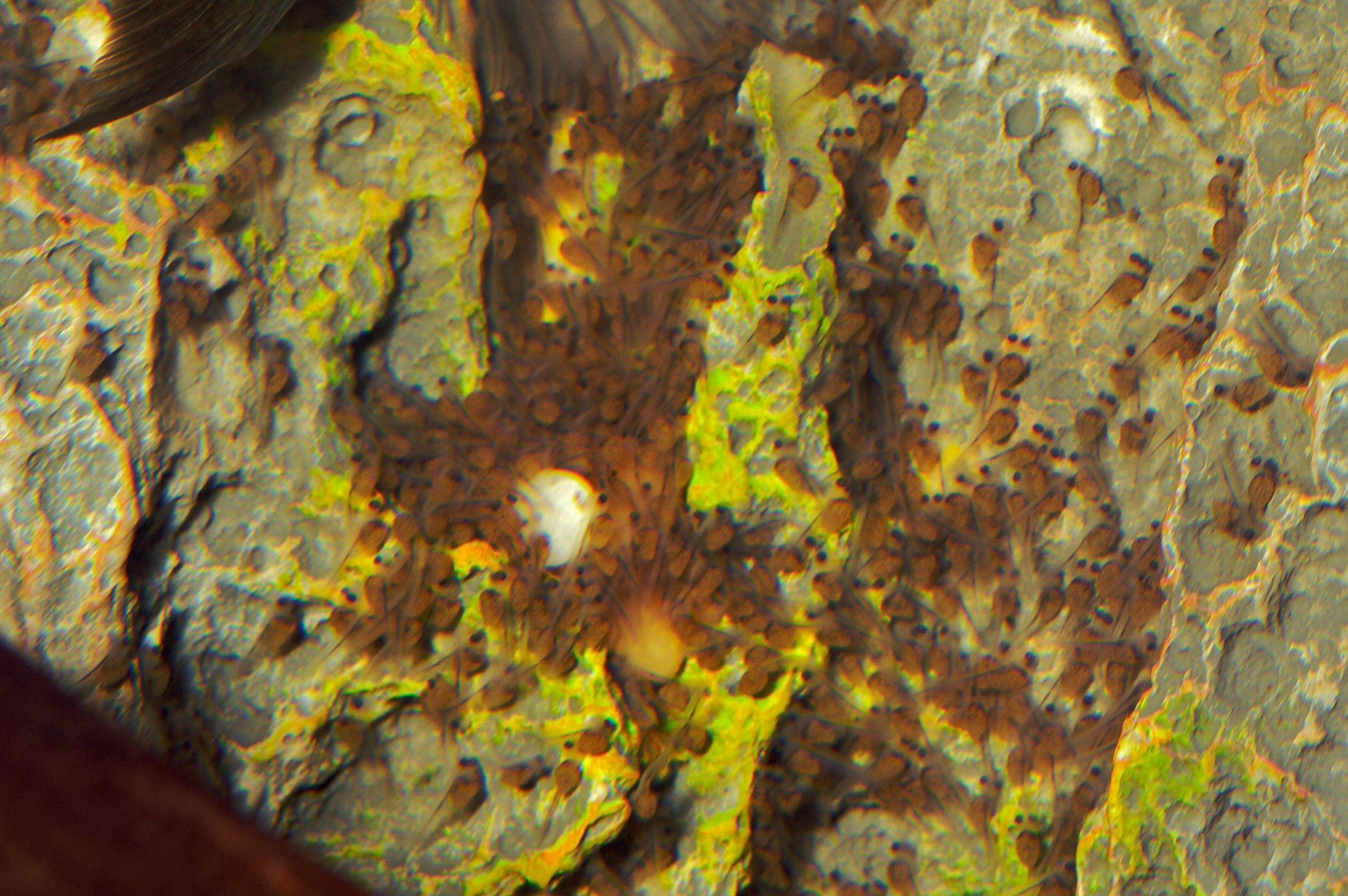
3 day old larvae

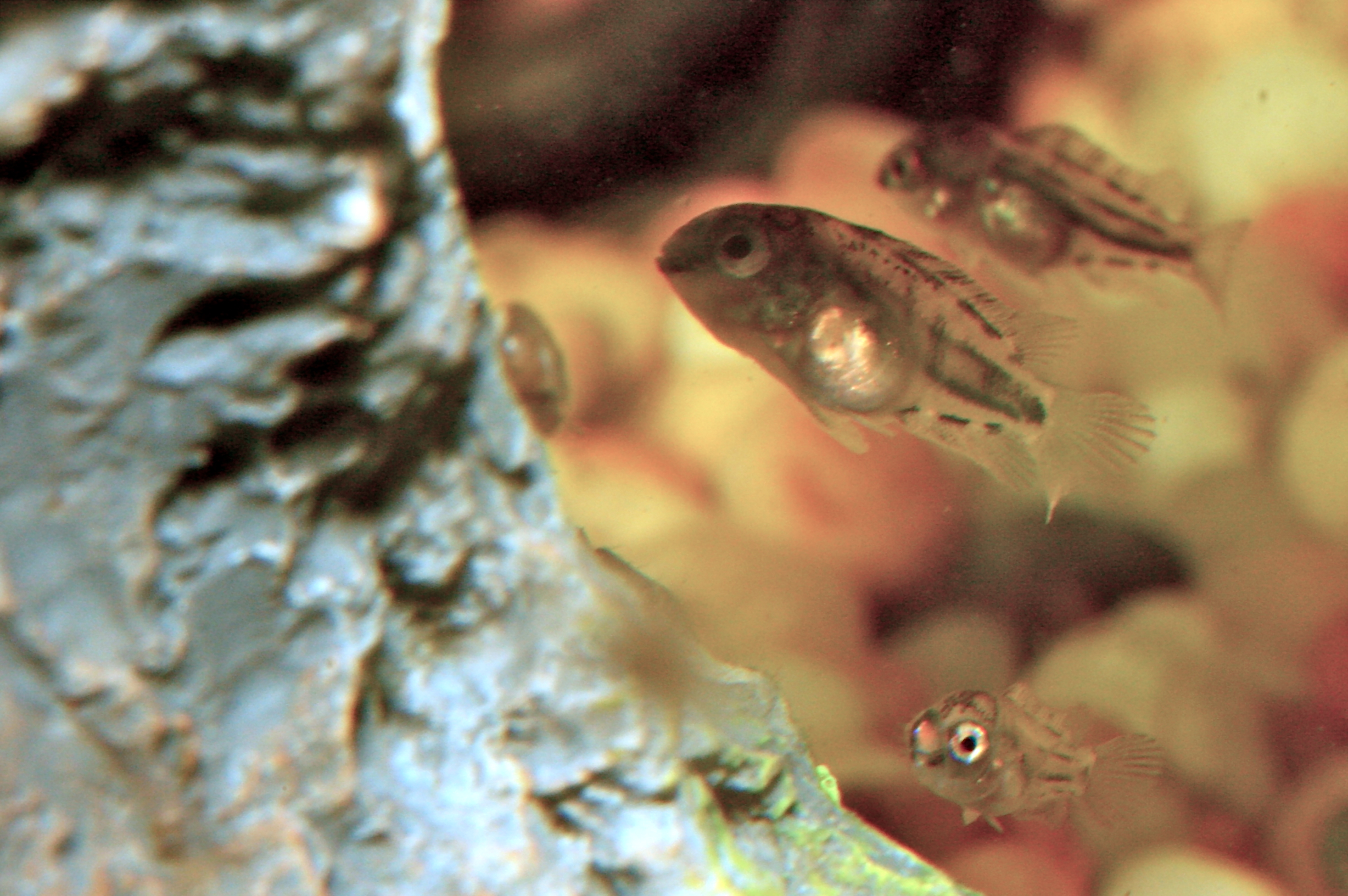
5 week old fry

After hatching, the larvae spend another 72 hours absorb their yolk sacs and developing their fins before they become free-swimming fry. The fry forage during daylight in a dense school and return to the cave or crevice for the night. Like other cichlids, the parents retrieve their young just before dark, sucking up three or four at a time and delivering them into the nest. The parents anticipate night, using a sense of time; in laboratory experiments convict cichlids continued to retrieve young as night approached even in the absence of any signal, such as dimming light. During the night, the fry bunch up at the bottom of the cave or nest, where the parents fan them.

Both parents remain involved in guarding the fry from brood predators and engage in behaviors to assist feeding such as moving leaves or fin digging (digging up the substrate with their fins). Brood care of eggs, larvae and free-swimming juveniles in the wild can last 4 to 6 weeks, and occurs only once per season for the majority of females. In contrast, females in aquaria are known to breed many times per year with short intervals of 12 or 13 days between broods, as long as suitable rocks or similar surfaces are available for them to lay their eggs on.

=== Mating system ===
Convict cichlids are serially monogamous, so pair bonds may form first before they establish a territory together, or the male and female may each obtain a territory before pairing with each other. Because the convict cichlids are also substrate-brooding, this territory will include a breeding site for the deposition of eggs.

=== Sexual selection ===
The effect of population density on sexual selection for convict cichlids has been studied. When nest density was greater, the females tended to be larger, which is more accurately explained by density-dependent mate preference and mating competition, as opposed to predation and resource competition. Moreover, as the two nest density regimes were compared, with one high and one low, there was no significant difference in brood survival between the two; however, the convict cichlids did prefer to breed farther away from each other, not in close proximity. This indicates that there are some other costs with breeding in an environment with high population density, an example being energy loss because of the resulting increased aggression when guarding territory.

The female's preference for the male mate has also been examined, in accordance to the male's size and fighting ability. The female cichlid always chooses the larger of the two males if the smaller male is next to the larger male, and if the larger male defeats the smaller male in a fight. If the males are not viewed together at the same time for a comparison to be drawn by the female, the female has no particular preference. Females do benefit by mating with a larger male, as it has been shown that larger males can raise more offspring to independence, are better at chasing predators that might attack offspring, and are better at competing for breeding sites. Male size may act as a more effective indicator of aggression, which may thus repel intruders before they can come closer to the offspring. It has been shown that individuals of significantly greater size relative to their opponent often win fights without much physical contact.

=== Parental roles ===
Female with juveniles

Convict cichlids are a biparental species, so the parents will usually cooperate by carrying out tasks specific to their individual parental roles when raising their offspring. This is common in cichlid fish, and studies have shown coordination between the female and male. The female tends to remain with the brood and perform activities involving the brood fanning the eggs, whereas the male tends to patrol the area to chase intruders and defend from predators. Both parents are able to carry out all of the parental care tasks to a certain extent. However, because they are biparentally custodial, each sex will still focus on a specific set of behaviors in particular, which is susceptible to change during the brood cycle. In fact, it is observed that when one of the mates is removed, either parent is still able to raise the offspring independently by having the capacity for all the parental behaviors. As the young offspring grow and become free-swimming fry, the parental activities are distributed more equally between the parents, which appears to be typical behavior in other types of cichlids as well.

The different ways in which this biparental sex role specialization can be influenced was studied by manipulating the presence and absence of the mate as well as the presence and absence of an intruder. The former variable was considered because the specialization of parental roles only occurs when both parents are present, while the latter variable was considered because it is thought that biparental care in these cichlids was an evolutionary consequence of the protection of offspring from intruders. When both mates are present with no intruder, both parents may stay with the offspring by resembling single parents because each parent is addressing only the offspring and not its mate, or one parent may be concentrated on activities associated with the offspring while the other parent concentrates on patrolling and defending the area. Under these isolated conditions, a more equal sharing of parental behaviors tends to occur. However, when both mates are present and an intruder is introduced, the male spends more time chasing intruders while the female remains with the offspring more. When the intruder is present but a parent is by itself, the widowed male tends to leave the offspring unattended and instead attacks the intruder or predator. Therefore, the conclusive finding is that the male rarely remains with the offspring when the female is absent, and the female rarely confronts the intruder when the male is absent.

=== Brood adoption ===
Convict cichlids may show extended biparental care and adopt unrelated young of the same species of similar or smaller body size compared to their own biological offspring. The parents may benefit by adopting smaller young by taking advantage of the dilution effect, which is when the risk of predation for an individual is reduced because the group size is larger. Another reason that has been considered is that foreign young that are larger than the biological offspring may be a direct predatory threat to them. However, it has been shown that as the biological offspring develop and become stronger swimmers, the parents are less active about rejecting larger foreign young, but when they do reject, often foreign young are rejected before they are large enough to be perceived as a direct threat to the biological offspring. Thus, it can be concluded that the brood adoption and rejection rely more heavily on the protection of the biological offspring from differential predator instead of from larger adopted cichlids.

== Aggressive behavior ==
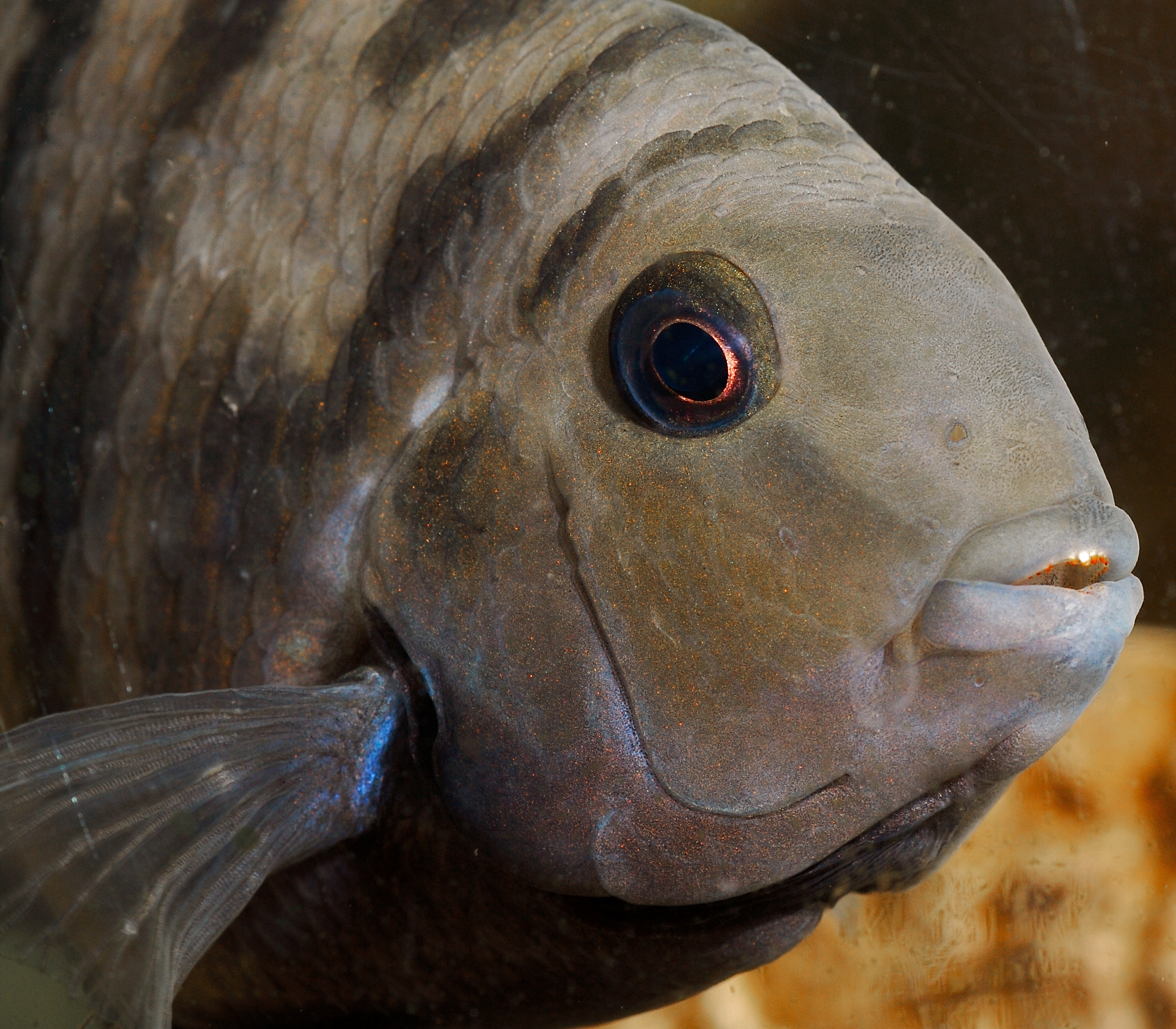
Close up of a male, with teeth visible

Convict cichlids are known to be highly aggressive and territorial when breeding, possessing a variety of complex behaviors and adaptations, which have been suggested to be a result of environmental conditions, individual development, and trait variation. Due to their aggressive nature, cichlids are popularly studied to investigate the factors that may potentially cause their behavior. Convict cichlids usually demonstrate their aggressive behavior by biting and chasing, which entails bursts of high speed targeted at the intruder, and also show their aggression via their body size.

It has been shown that environmental parameters like changes in temperature and prior residence may affect the cichlid's territorial aggression. The convict cichlids are more aggressive at 30 °C as opposed to 26 °C, which may be explained by the fact that convict cichlids tend to set up their breeding sites and spawn at 30 °C.

== Aquarium care ==
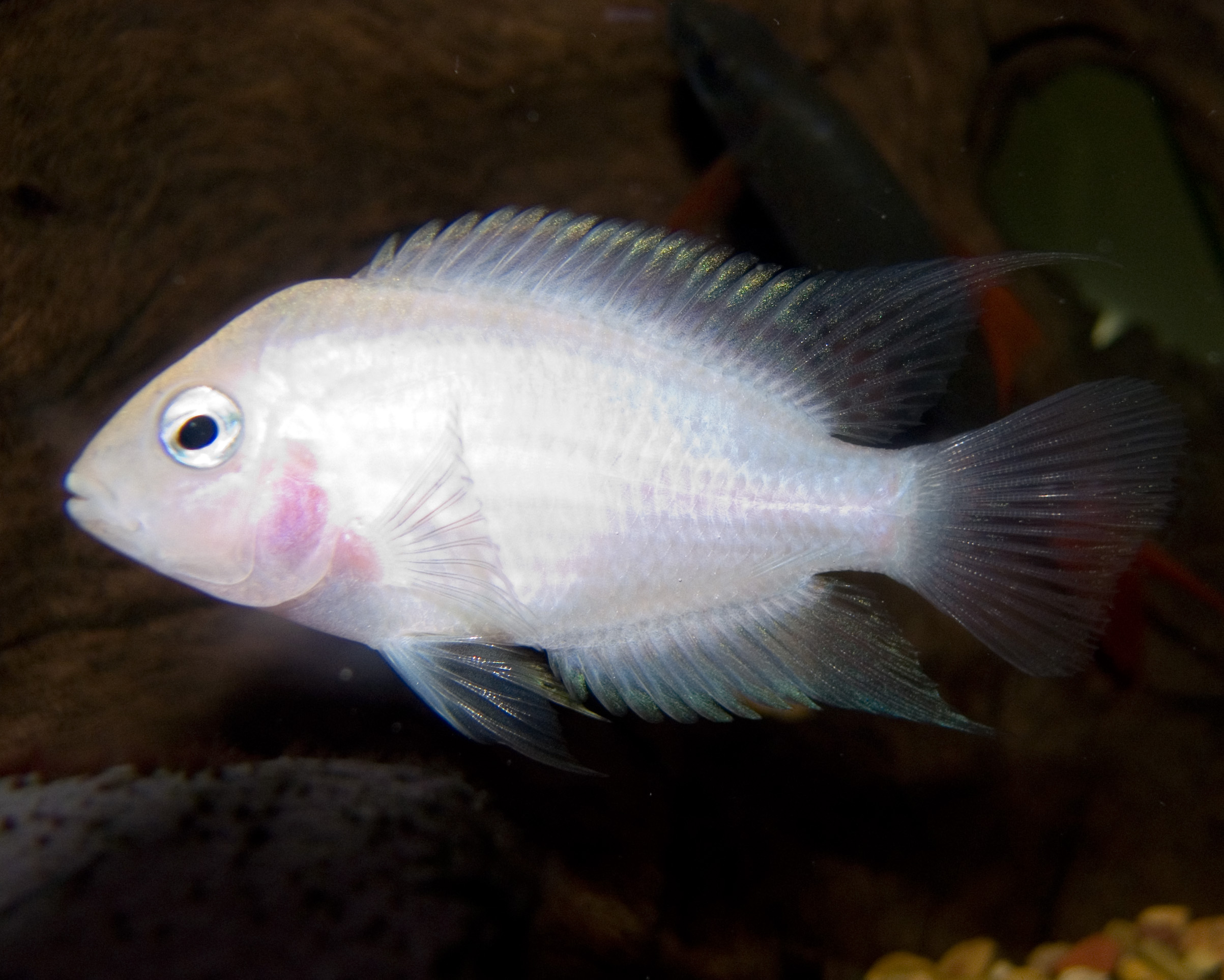
A young leucistic male convict cichlid

The aquarium should be decorated to mimic the natural environment and include rocks and artificial caves for breeding. Most experts agree that a pair of convicts should be kept in a 20-gallon aquarium or larger. The species is an unfussy omnivore and most types of prepared fish foods are readily accepted. The species also consumes aquatic plants so plastic plants or robust plants such as java fern or water sprite are recommended. Convict cichlids are aggressively territorial during breeding and pairs are best kept alone. Brood care is reduced in aquarium strains. Due to the species' tendency to dig, external filtration is superior to undergravel filter systems. Its relatively small size, along with ease of keeping and breeding, make the convict an ideal cichlid for beginners and advanced aquarists alike interested in observing pair bonds and brood care.

=== Breeding ===
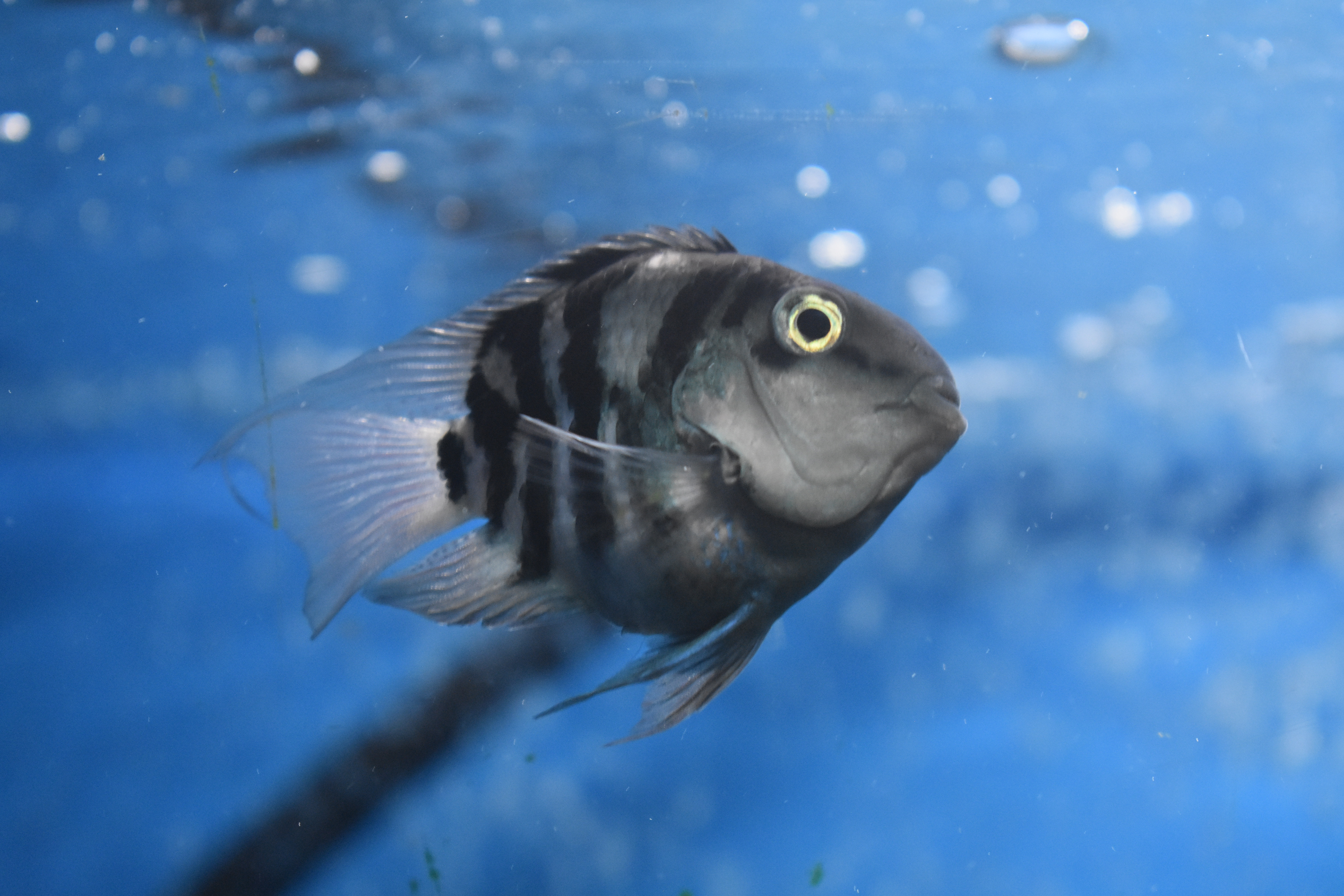
Hybrid between a convict and a blood parrot cichlid

Breeding convicts is as simple as having a male and a female in the same tank with adequate water quality and feeding. There is no special conditioning required. Due to their prolific breeding in captivity, there is a very low demand for Convict fry, and one may easily find their aquarium overstocked with an inbreeding population of Convicts without any avenues for adoption.

== See also ==
- Cichlid
- Amatitlania
- Archocentrus
- List of freshwater aquarium fish species
