= Blue-eye cichlid =

Scientific classification
- Domain: Eukaryota
- Kingdom: Animalia
- Phylum: Chordata
- Class: Actinopterygii
- Order: Cichliformes
- Family: Cichlidae
- Genus: Cryptoheros
- Species: C. spilurus

Binomial name
- Cryptoheros spilurus (Günther, 1862)

Species of fish

The blue-eye cichlid (Cryptoheros spilurus) is a small species of fish in the family Cichlidae. It is native to Central America. It can reach a length of 12 centimeters (4.7 in). The average life span is 5 years. It has a predominantly blue body with black vertical stripes, and short fins along the belly and spine.
