= Bloodlands (TV series) =

Crime drama series set in Northern Ireland

- Series 1 DVD cover
- Genre: Crime drama
- Created by: Chris Brandon
- Written by: Chris Brandon
- Directed by: Pete Travis; Jon East; Audrey Cook
- Starring: James Nesbitt; Lorcan Cranitch; Lisa Dwan; Ian McElhinney; Charlene McKenna; Lola Petticrew; Michael Smiley; Chris Walley
- Music by: Ruth Barrett
- Country of origin: United Kingdom
- Original language: English
- No. of series: 2
- No. of episodes: 10

Production
- Executive producers: Jed Mercurio; Jimmy Mulville; Mark Redhead; Tommy Bulfin; Tom Lazenby
- Producer: Christopher Hall
- Production location: Northern Ireland
- Running time: 57 minutes
- Production company: HTM Television

Original release
- Network: BBC One
- Release: 21 February 2021 – 23 October 2022

Bloodlands is a police procedural television series set in Northern Ireland that premiered on BBC One on 21 February 2021. It was created by Chris Brandon and developed by HTM Television, a joint venture between Hat Trick Productions and the producer Jed Mercurio. The show was renewed for a second series on 14 March 2021, with filming commencing in February 2022.

Bloodlands was filmed mainly in the rural area around Strangford Lough in the east of Northern Ireland.

== Cast and characters ==
=== Main ===
- James Nesbitt as DCI Tom Brannick
- Lorcan Cranitch as DCS Jackie Twomey
- Charlene McKenna as DS Niamh McGovern
- Chris Walley as DC Billy “Birdy” Bird
- Lola Petticrew as Izzy Brannick

=== Series 1 ===
- Michael Smiley as Justin “Dinger” Bell
- Susan Lynch as DCI Heather Pentland
- Ian McElhinney as Adam Corry
- Lisa Dwan as Tori Matthews
- Peter Ballance as Patrick Keenan
- Kathy Kiera Clarke as Claire Keenan
- Cara Kelly as Siobhan Harkin
- Caolan Byrne as Ben McFarland
- Valerie Lilley as Linda Corry

=== Series 2 ===
- Victoria Smurfit as Olivia Foyle
- Diarmaid Murtagh as Robert Dardis
- Jonjo O'Neill as Ryan Savage

== Episodes ==
=== Series overview ===
Series	Episodes	Originally released		Average viewership (in millions)
Series	Episodes	First released	Last released	Average viewership (in millions)
1	4	21 February 2021	14 March 2021	9.24
2	6	18 September 2022	23 October 2022	TBA

=== Series 1 (2021) ===
No.	Title	Original release date	U.K. viewers (millions)
1	"Episode One"	21 February 2021	10.32
2	"Episode Two"	28 February 2021	9.22
3	"Episode Three"	7 March 2021	9.28
4	"Episode Four"	14 March 2021	8.15

=== Series 2 (2022) ===
No.	Title	Original release date	U.K. viewers (millions)
1	"Episode One"	18 September 2022	3.87
2	"Episode Two"	25 September 2022	3.33
3	"Episode Three"	2 October 2022	3.33
4	"Episode Four"	9 October 2022	3.72
5	"Episode Five"	16 October 2022	3.65
6	"Episode Six"	23 October 2022	3.84

== Broadcast ==
Series 1 was streamed on Acorn TV in the United States and Canada in 2021. Series 2 was streamed on Acorn TV in February 2023.

== Reception ==
=== Critical reception ===
The review aggregator Rotten Tomatoes gave the series an 83% approval rating, with an average rating of 6.9/10, based on 24 reviews. The critical consensus reads, "Bloodlands at times threatens to buckle under the weight of its heavy load, but thrilling twists and incredible performances hold steady to create an engaging, challenging viewing experience.” On Metacritic, the series has a weighted average score of 76 out of 100 based on 9 reviews, indicating "generally favourable reviews”.

Abby Robinson, reviewing for Digital Spy, described the opening episode of the drama as "heavily plot-driven, which comes at the expense of character developments" and gave it three out of five. Lucy Mangan of The Guardian, described the drama as "enjoyably dense with enough black humour to let it breathe" and gave it four out of five. Ed Power said the first episode of the series was "So grim – and a seriously bad advertisement for a weekend break in Belfast" when reviewing on behalf of The Irish Times, and Lauren Morris, reviewing on behalf of the Radio Times called it "An unpredictable thriller with all the hallmarks of a Jed Mercurio drama".

=== Awards and nominations ===
Year	Category	Award	Nominee	Result
2021	Best Actor in a Lead Role - Drama	Irish Film and Television Awards	James Nesbitt	Nominated
2022	Best Actor in a Series, Drama/Genre	Satellite Awards	James Nesbitt	Nominated
