= The Cichlid Room Companion =

The Cichlid Room Companion (CRC) is a membership-based webpage dedicated to the fishes of the Cichlid family (Cichlidae). The site was launched in May 1996 and offers arguably the most comprehensive authoritative catalogue of cichlids on the web, which is illustrated with more than 25,000 photographs of fishes and 2,000 of habitats, as well as over 300 videos of cichlids and their habitats. It also “offers access to ample information about 253 genera and 2371 species”, a discussion forum as well as many articles about taxonomy, natural history, fish-keeping, field accounts, conservation, and other cichlid related topics; mostly written by citizen scientists and people who specialize in cichlids. The species summaries provided in the form of profiles include taxonomic, distribution and habitat, distribution maps, conservation, natural history, captive maintenance, images, videos, collection records, and an extensive bibliography of the species included and have been prepared by world-class specialists. A document establishes the standards followed in the preparation and maintenance of the cichlid catalogue. The site is administered by its creator and editor, Juan Miguel Artigas-Azas, a naturalist, who is also an aquarist and a nature photographer. In 2008, the American Cichlid Association (ACA) awarded Artigas-Azas the Guy Jordan Retrospective Award, which is the maximum honor that association gives to people who have done extensive contribution to the international cichlid hobby.

== Contributions to public understanding of science ==
In the past decade, the Internet has fundamentally transformed the relationships between the scientific community and society as a whole, as the boundaries between public and private, professionals and hobbyists fade away; allowing for a wider range of participants to engage with science in unprecedented ways. The educational and citizens science task of the CRC has been acknowledged in the formal scientific literature, both as a source of data, information, and awareness among fish hobbyists about topics like the threat of releases of invasive species from domestic aquaria, as well as promoting ethical behavior in the fish hobby. Furthermore, while for the most part, the CRC is a popular resource, a number of articles in it have some academic value, and have been cited as primary sources in the scholarly literature.

== Criticism ==
Biological systematics is a scientific discipline, which requires scientific training. It is often professed in the scientific community that reliable contention of scientific papers is restricted to scientific publications, that are backed up with scientific facts. "Hobby publications are non-scientific literature", and the scholarly use or discussion of names and other nomenclatural acts "dropped in the hobby is entirely questionable". Hobby articles, both printed and electronic, are usually published on the approval of the editors, whereas in a scientific journal, by contrast, all articles are peer reviewed. Moreover, in the case of the CRC, the site is not edited by a person educated in systematics or with an advanced degree in ichthyology or a related field. As of January, 2015, the catalogue section in the CRC displayed a disclaimer stating that they are "not to be considered as published in the sense of the Code, and statements made therein are not made available for nomenclatural purposes". Even so, the site has been criticized for censoring taxonomic information based on its editor's arbitrary, personal, subjective views (e.g. the synonymy of Paraneetroplus and Vieja sensu McMahan et al. 2010 (prior to 2015); the validity of Maylandia Meyer & Foerster 1984 vs its junior synonym Metriaclima Stauffer, J. R., Jr. and K. A. Kellogg 2002; the split of genus Nosferatu De la Maza-Benignos, et al. 2014 from Herichthys,; or the recent review of the taxonomy and systematics of the herichthyns;), on the basis of an anticonventional argument that official, in the sense of the Code, nomenclatural acts are not “mandatory” (see editor's comments). Some of the views have been corroborated by the scientific community, as has been the case of the genus Nosferatu that that is considered a junior synonym of Herichthys, while the synonymy of Vieja and Paraneetroplus was not initially accepted in 2015 in the CRC although, in 2016, it was proven that the genera are not synonymous.
