= Pete Travis =

British film director

- Born: Salford, Greater Manchester, England
- Occupations: Television, film director
- Years active: 1996–present

Pete Travis is a British television and film director. His work includes Cold Feet (1999), The Jury (2002) and Omagh (2004) for television and Vantage Point (2008), Endgame (2009), Dredd (2012) and City of Tiny Lights (2016) for cinema.

== Career ==
Before becoming a director, Pete Travis was a social worker. After taking a post-graduate course in film-making he bought the film rights to Nick Hornby's Faith for £12,000. A producer invested the same amount in the film and Faith premiered at the London Film Festival on 11 November 1997. Comparing Faith to other unsuccessful football films, Travis told The Guardian, "I think the secret of making a good football film is not to have any football in it [...] Football is so much about the passion of its supporters, and you cannot portray that by showing 11 guys running around. Faith is more about the spirit of football than the sport.

Travis became interested in film-making late in life, inspired by Alan Clarke, Costa Gavras and Frank Capra. His second short, an adaptation of Anne Fine's Bill's New Frock (1998), won the ScreenScene Award for Best Short Film or Video at the 1998 Atlantic Film Festival. Faith lead to direction work on the ITV series The Bill, Cold Feet and The Jury.

In 2003, Paul Greengrass sent Travis the script to Omagh—a dramatisation of the Omagh bombing that he co-wrote with Guy Hibbert—after seeing his work on The Jury and Henry VIII. The Channel 4/RTÉ television film premiered at the Toronto International Film Festival in 2004, where it won the Discovery Award. The next year it won the British Academy Television Award for Best Single Drama, which Travis shared with the producers. He was also nominated for the Irish Film and Television Award for Best Film Director.

His first studio film, Vantage Point, opened in the United States in February 2008 to the number one box office spot. Another film, Endgame, about the end of apartheid in South Africa, had its world premiere at the 2009 Sundance Film Festival. In June 2009, he signed on to direct Come Like Shadows, a reworking of Shakespeare's Macbeth. The following year he signed on to direct Dredd, a film adaptation of the Judge Dredd comics character. Travis never completed the film. Lead Karl Urban has said writer Alex Garland was the film's actual director.

== Filmography ==
Short film

- Faith (1998)
- Bill's New Frock (1998)

=== Film ===
Director

- Vantage Point (2008)
- Dredd (2012)
- City of Tiny Lights (2016)

Writer

- The Gunman (2015)

=== Television ===
Year	Title	Notes
1997	The Bill	Episode "Rift"
1999	Cold Feet	2 episodes
2000	Other People's Children	4 episodes
2002	The Jury	6 episodes
2003	Henry VIII	Miniseries
2017	Fearless	6 episodes
2019–2020	Project Blue Book	4 episodes
2021	Bloodlands	4 episodes
2022	Marie Antoinette	4 episodes

TV movies

Year	Title	Notes
2004	Omagh	
2009	Endgame	With limited theatrical release
2013	Legacy	
2015	The Go-Between	

== Awards ==
Year	Award	Category	Title	Result
2004	Toronto International Film Festival	Discovery Award	Omagh	Won
2005	British Academy Television Award	Best Single Drama	Omagh	Won
2005	Irish Film and Television Award	Best Film Director	Omagh	Nominated
2005	Director's Guild of Great Britain Awards	Outstanding Directorial Achievement in Television Movie/Miniseries	Omagh	Nominated
