= Polly Neate, Baroness Neate =

British charity executive, social policy expert and member of the House of Lords

The Right Honourable The Baroness Neate CBE
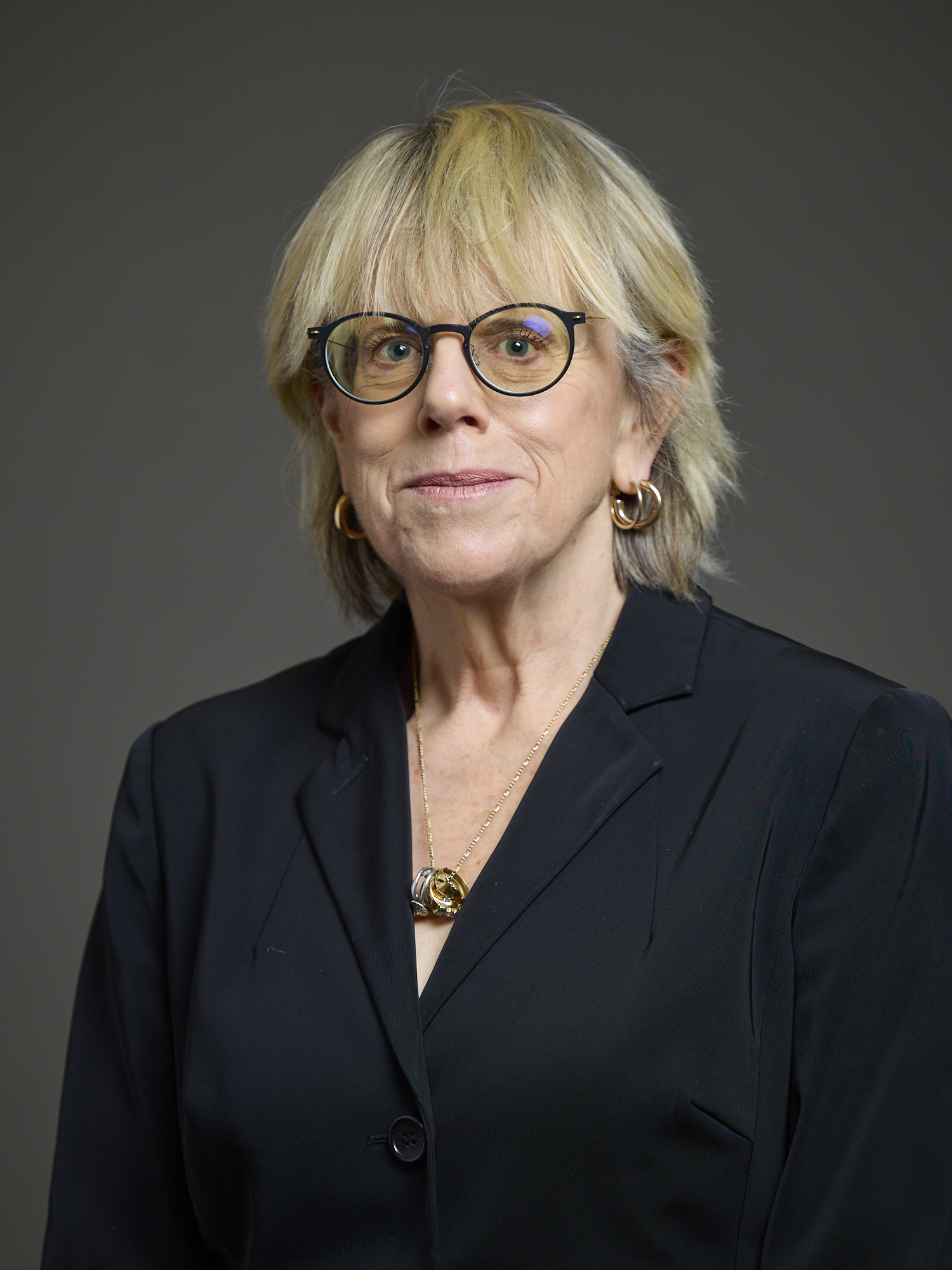
- Official portrait, 2026

Member of the House of Lords
- Lord Temporal
- Life peerage 26 November 2025

Personal details
- Born: 1965 or 1966 (age 60–61)
- Party: None (Crossbench)
- Parent: Francis Neate (father)
- Education: University of Bristol

Mary Jane Fiona "Polly" Neate, Baroness Neate, CBE (born 1966), is a British social commentator, campaigner and social policy expert whose work has changed laws, and who has been CEO of both Shelter and Women's Aid, and executive director of Action for Children. She was made a CBE in the 2020 New Year Honours list and was made Honorary Doctor of Laws by the University of Bristol in October 2022. In 2025, she was made a life peer.

== Early life and education ==
Neate was born in 1966. Her mother, Patricia Mulligan, is a psychotherapist and her father, Francis Neate, is a lawyer and former president of the International Bar Association. One of her brothers is novelist Patrick Neate.

She attended Gumley House Convent School, Isleworth and St Paul's Girls' School, London, before graduating in English from the University of Bristol. She then took a postgraduate diploma in journalism at City, University of London.

After her diploma she was a freelancer whose work was published in The Guardian and the New Statesman before she became the editor of Community Care.

== Career in the charity sector ==
Neate moved into charity work in 2005 when she became Executive Director of External Relations at Action for Children until 2013. She sat as an independent member of the Labour working group on children's policy in 2008–09 and sat on the Conservative Party Commission on the Future of Social work in 2009.

She became chief executive of Women's Aid in 2013 where she helped secure legislation to criminalise coercive and controlling behaviour. In this role, she also sat as an independent member of the Labour working group on domestic violence policy, and as an independent member of the Conservative government's National Oversight Group on Domestic Violence. She campaigned for improved treatment of domestic abuse survivors and their children in the family courts, and as a result was targeted by men’s rights activists. She also successfully campaigned for investment in women's refuges.Domestic abuse victims praise The Sun on Sunday's Save Our Shelters campaign with Women's Aid as Government guarantees vital funding for women's refuges

Neate became CEO of Shelter in 2017. In that role she introduced community organisers in local service hubs, and campaigned successfully for greater rights for renters and for investment in social housing. Under her leadership, Shelter secured the Social Housing (Regulation) Act 2023, in partnership with survivors of the Grenfell Tower fire, and also demonstrated through strategic litigation that refusal to let property to a tenant on grounds that they receive benefits is indirect discrimination under the Equality Act 2010.

She is a trustee of Women in Sport, and a non-executive director of Wessex Local Medical Committees and Abri. She is a previous trustee of the Young Women's Trust.

She is co-host of the Better Way podcast and of a podcast series on privilege for the Association of Chief Executives of Voluntary Organisations.

Her public speaking ranges from the Oxford Union to the first Women's March on London. She writes opinion pieces on social policy, housing, women's rights, leadership, and wider social justice issues.

She won Best Charity CEO on Twitter in 2019's Social CEOs awards.

Polly is Convenor of the Social Insights Panel hosted by the Future Governance Forum,

== Appointment to the House of Lords ==
In October 2025, Neate was nominated for a life peerage by the House of Lords Appointments Commission to sit as a crossbench peer in the House of Lords. She was created as Baroness Neate, of Hammersmith in the London Borough of Hammersmith and Fulham on 26 November 2025.

== Personal life ==
She is married to Hugh Thornbery CBE and has two grown-up daughters. Neate was permanently disabled in a rock climbing accident in January 2022, but remains a committed rock climber who speaks on the importance of more equitable access to climbing and the outdoors more widely.
