= National English Ability Test =

National English Ability Test (NEAT) is a test of ability to understand and use English. The test was developed in South Korea by the Korea Institute for Curriculum and Evaluation (KICE). It provides for testing in speaking, listening, writing, and reading. The test was developed as an attempt to lessen Korea's dependence on foreign language tests. According to the National Institute for International Education, the total time that the test lasts is 155 minutes. The same organization says the test is to be available in the public sector in 2014, but it is already available for individual taking in 2013. The NEAT organization provides a conversion sheet comparing NEAT scores to TOEIC and TOEFL scores. The test is aimed primarily at evaluating academic preparation (such as for entrance to universities). Even though one of NEAT's aims is to get away from "teaching to the test," there are already a number of study books written specifically as NEAT preparation material.

In 2012, the exam was given to Korean English teachers. As a result of errors uncovered in the test as well as difficulties that teachers had, the original implementation date of using NEAT to test for English skills as an official part of college application was delayed from 2015 to 2019.
