= Banano River =

River in Costa Rica

Coordinates: 9.9204°N 83.0001°W

Banano River is a river of Costa Rica.
