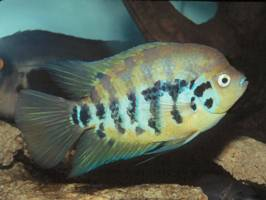

Conservation status
- Least Concern (IUCN 3.1)

Scientific classification
- Kingdom: Animalia
- Phylum: Chordata
- Class: Actinopterygii
- Order: Cichliformes
- Family: Cichlidae
- Genus: Archocentrus; T. N. Gill, 1877
- Species: A. centrarchus

Binomial name
- Archocentrus centrarchus (T. N. Gill, 1877)

= Archocentrus =

Genus of fishes

Archocentrus is a genus of cichlid fish from Central America. It currently contains a single species, the flier cichlid (Archocentrus centrarchus), which is found in stagnant and slow-moving freshwater habitats such as lakes, ponds, ditches, swamps and rivers in Honduras, Nicaragua and Costa Rica. It is up to 11 cm (4.3 in) long and feeds on invertebrates and detritus.

Archocentrus formerly included some of the species now included in the genera Cryptoheros and Amatitlania, such as the convict cichlid. The rainbow cichlid was temporarily included in the genus Archocentrus but is now back in its original genus Herotilapia.
