= Patrick Neate =

British novelist, journalist, poet, screenwriter, and podcaster

- Born: 1970 (age 55–56)
- Education: Cambridge University
- Occupations: Novelist, journalist, poet, screenwriter and podcaster
- Awards: Betty Trask Award (for Musungu Jim); Whitbread Award (for Twelve Bar Blues); NBCC Award for Criticism (for Where You're At)

Patrick Neate (born 1970) is a British novelist, journalist, poet, screenwriter and podcaster.

== Early life ==
Born and raised as a Roman Catholic in South London, Neate was educated at St. Paul's School and Cambridge University. He spent a gap year in Zimbabwe and has since returned to Africa on many occasions. He drew on the gap year experience in Musungu Jim and the Great Chief Tuloko. He is the son of cricketer and lawyer Francis Neate, the nephew of cricketer Patrick Whistler Neate, and the younger brother of social policy expert Polly Neate.

== Career ==
=== Novels ===
His books to date, in order of publication, include Musungu Jim, Twelve Bar Blues, London Pigeon Wars, Where You're At, City of Tiny Lights, Culture is Our Weapon, and Jerusalem.

Musungu Jim, Twelve Bar Blues and Jerusalem are a trilogy in that the characters of Jim and Musa Musa are found in all three novels. However, each stands alone.

In each, he takes a foreign culture and explores the nature of story and the power of stories to create identities. At its best, his writing is lyrical about the nature of humanity, and yet still sufficiently entertaining to count as an "easy read". Musungu Jim envisages a coup triggered off by a hapless gap year student in an African dictatorship not unlike Mugabe's Zimbabwe. Twelve Bar Blues interweaves various characters but focusses chiefly on Lick Holden, a semi-mythical horn player, not unlike the legendary Buddy Bolden.

In The London Pigeon Wars, he attempted to talk about his own milieu, London, but the twist comes through the fact that part of the narrative is focalised through the pigeons who are at war in the area. Thematically, it tackles the dangers of consumerism.

City of Tiny Lights is a further change of genre, entering the mystery thriller. This time, the publication uncannily coincided with the 7 July 2005 London bombings as his cricket-loving detective, Tommy Akhtar, uncovers crime that leads into terrorist cells.

Where You're At draws on Neate's first love, hip-hop. A work of non-fiction, it shows the author crossing the planet to uncover the meanings hip-hop has accrued in different cultures.

Jerusalem follows on from Musungu Jim and Twelve Bar Blues. It uses a three-way plot line: the first plotline follows a soldier at the time of the Boer War struggling with Englishness; the second concerns Jim, Musa and the dictator of Zambawi; the third, a contemporary take on Britain, following style guru Preston Pinner, creating a new hip-hop sensation "Nobody", whose take on Jerusalem plays out as a major hit.

Across his work, recurring themes are the ability of re-envisage common situations from an alternative point of view, to imagine himself into a completely different world and to realise the importance of story in establishing one's self-identity.

=== Screen and performance ===
Neate wrote the screenplay for the 2016 film City of Tiny Lights, starring Riz Ahmed and based on his novel of the same name.

Neate also wrote the screenplay for the film The Tesseract, adapted from the book by Alex Garland.

Neate's longform poem "Babel" was transformed into a physical theatre piece by acclaimed choreographers Stan Won't Dance, in 2010.

A supporter of literary diversity, Neate founded Book Slam with Ben Watt (from Everything but the Girl), a storytelling salon in which writers, poets and singer-songwriters perform in a nightclub environment.

=== Journalism ===
Publications for which Neate has written include The Washington Post, The Independent, Building, Hospital Doctor, The Face, Doctor, Minx, The Times, The Telegraph, Marie Claire, The Sunday Times, The Guardian, Harpers and Queen, The Sunday Tribune, The Standard, Mixmag, Sky, Q, Time Out, Tatler, The Sunday Telegraph and The Independent on Sunday.

== Awards ==
In 2000, Neate won a Betty Trask Award for his first novel, Musungu Jim. In 2001 he won a Whitbread Award for his second book, Twelve Bar Blues, which also won the Prix de l'inaperçu in France. In 2005, he won the NBCC Award for Criticism for his non-fiction book about hip-hop culture, Where You're At. He has also been shortlisted for the Authors' Club Award, the L.A. Times Book Award and an Edgar Award (the Mystery Writers of America Awards).

== Filmography ==
- The Tesseract (2003) (Screenwriter)
- City of Tiny Lights (2016) (Screenwriter)
