= Patrick Neate (cricketer) =

English cricketer

Personal information
- Full name: Patrick Whistler Neate
- Born: 2 May 1946 (age 80); Newbury, Berkshire, England
- Batting: Left-handed
- Bowling: Right-arm medium
- Relatives: Francis Neate (brother)

Domestic team information
- Years: Team
- 1966: Oxford University
- 1964–1979: Berkshire

Career statistics
Competition	FC
Matches	1
Runs scored	3
Batting average	3.00
100s/50s	–/–
Top score	3
Balls bowled	174
Wickets	–
Bowling average	–
5 wickets in innings	–
10 wickets in match	–
Best bowling	–
Catches/stumpings	2/–
- Source: Cricinfo, 20 September 2010

Patrick Whistler Neate (born 2 May 1946) is an English former cricketer. Neate was a right-handed batsman who bowled right-arm medium pace. He was born at Newbury, Berkshire.

Neate made his only first-class appearance for Oxford University in 1966, against Nottinghamshire. Neate scored just 3 runs in the match.

Two years prior to playing for Oxford University, Neate made his Minor Counties Championship debut for Berkshire in 1964 against Dorset. From 1964 to 1979, he represented the county in 77 Minor Counties Championship matches, the last of which came in the 1979 Championship when Berkshire played Devon.

== Family ==
His brother Francis Neate also played first-class matches for Oxford University, as well as playing Minor Counties cricket and List-A cricket for Berkshire from 1958 to 1979. Francis Neate was the Berkshire captain from 1971 to 1975, with Patrick playing under him. Their father, also called Francis, played Minor Counties cricket for Berkshire in 1932 and 1933.
