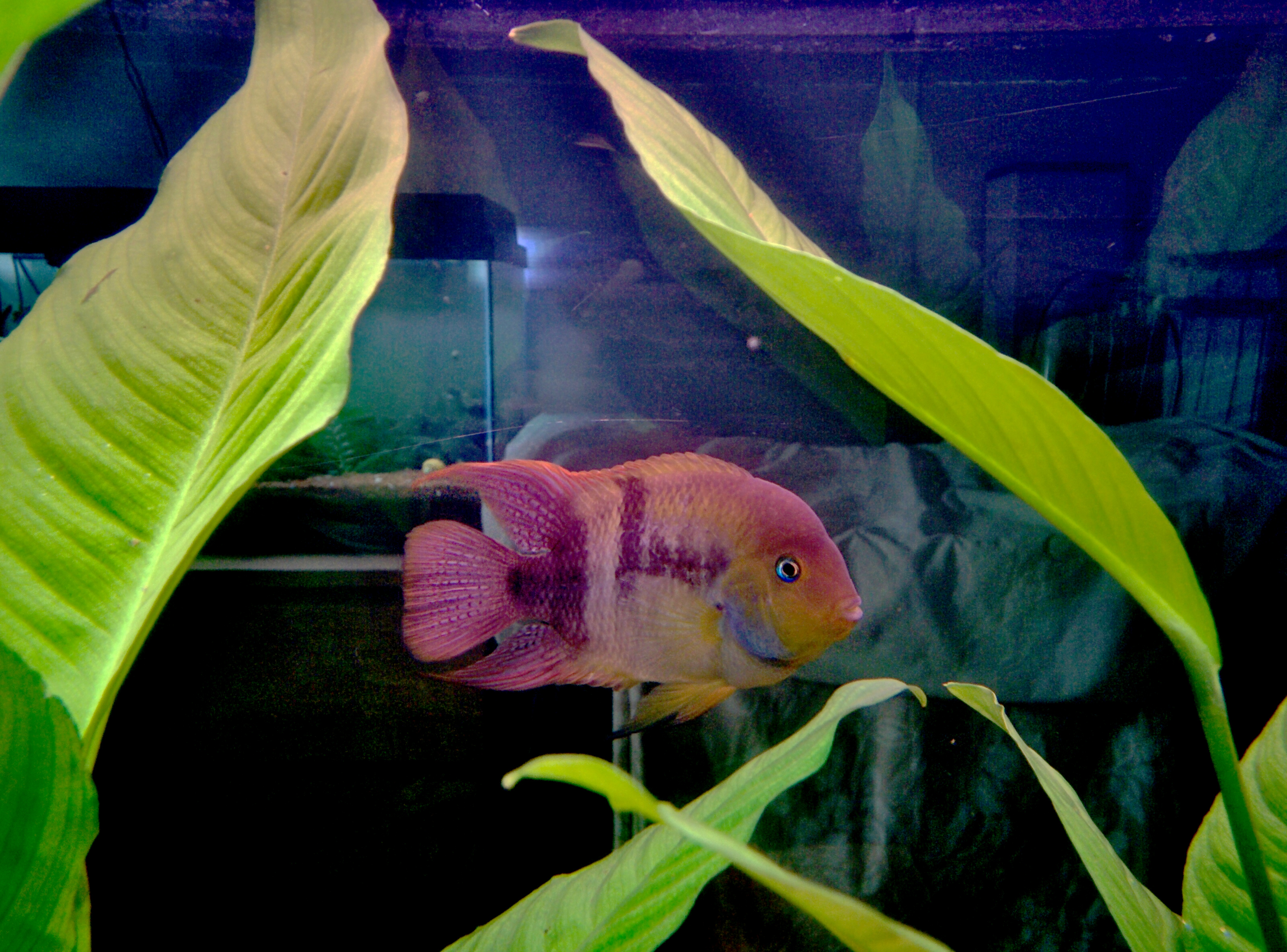

Conservation status
- Vulnerable (IUCN 3.1)

Scientific classification
- Kingdom: Animalia
- Phylum: Chordata
- Class: Actinopterygii
- Order: Cichliformes
- Family: Cichlidae
- Genus: Amatitlania
- Species: A. sajica

Binomial name
- Amatitlania sajica (W. A. Bussing, 1974)

Synonyms
- Cichlasoma sajica Bussing, 1974; Archocentrus sajica (Bussing, 1974); Cryptoheros sajica (Bussing, 1974)

= Amatitlania sajica =

Species of fish

Amatitlania sajica, the T-bar cichlid or Sajica cichlid, is a Central American species of cichlid found in freshwater streams and lakes on the Pacific slope of Costa Rica. The fish is tan colored with seven indistinct bars on the body. The third bar is usually prominent and coupled with a dark lateral stripe running from the gill cover results in a horizontal T-shaped mark, hence the common name of T-bar cichlid.

== Environment ==
The T-bar cichlid inhabits rivers which have moderate to strong currents in Costa Rica at up to 2000 feet of elevation, but they are not found in the rapids. They prefer smaller rocks and gravel. They are omnivorous, feeding on algal filaments, aquatic insects, seeds and bottom detritus.

== Breeding ==
Male A. sajica reach to 12 cm. Mature females that are ready to spawn have a beautiful golden yellow color on their dorsal and anal fins.

These fish exhibits a number of different cichlid spawning behaviors including cave spawning (most common) and open substrate spawning. Which method that is used seem to depend on the mood of the parents not on the availability of suitable spawning caves. They pair off with a dance in which the male swimming parallel to the female. The males can be really aggressive with a female that is not ready to spawn, to the point where he may kill her. The female will find a secluded shelter to lay many eggs such as a large crevice between rocks or a nest dug in the gravel. The male will then fertilize the eggs and then ferociously protect them from any other fish which come near.

Upon hatching after 3 days from the female laying the eggs, the fry will attempt to swim with the egg enclosed around its body. Eventually, the fry will resemble tiny versions of their parents. The female and male occasionally move the fry in their mouth to the nest if they stray too far from it, however the male might eat a few of them. They are very good parents and are often able to raise young to adult size in crowded community aquariums.

== See also ==
- List of freshwater aquarium fish species
