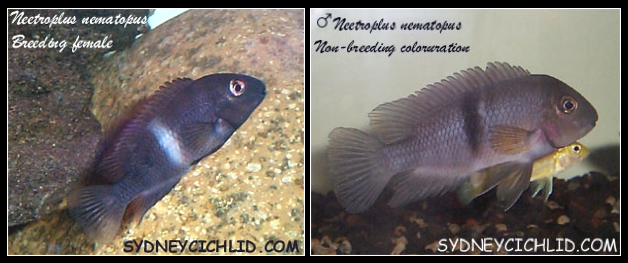
- Breeding (left) and normal colouration (right).

Conservation status
- Near Threatened (IUCN 3.1)

Scientific classification
- Kingdom: Animalia
- Phylum: Chordata
- Class: Actinopterygii
- Order: Cichliformes
- Family: Cichlidae
- Genus: Neetroplus
- Species: N. nematopus

Binomial name
- Neetroplus nematopus (Günther, 1867)

Synonyms
- Neetroplus nematopus Günther, 1867; Neetroplus nicaraguensis T.N. Gill, 1877; Neetroplus fluviatilis Meek, 1912

= Poor man's tropheus =

Species of fish

The poor man's tropheus (Neetroplus nematopus) is a species of fish in the family Cichlidae. Until 2007 it was the only species in the genus Neetroplus, but at that time it was reclassified into the genus Hypsophrys. In 2016 it was restored to the genus Neetroplus based on genetic research by Říčan, et al. Its name comes from having similar diet, behavior, and body shape to the tropheus.

It is a small-medium-sized cichlid growing to a length of 12 cm (4.7 in). It occurs in Central America in Lake Xiloá, Lake Managua, Lake Masaya and Lake Nicaragua and in riverine habitats on the Atlantic coasts of Costa Rica and Nicaragua. Like most Central American cichlids the species is commonly found in hard, alkaline (pH 7.5) water. Its diet consists of algae and plant material which it scrapes from rocks and other hard surfaces in a fashion similar to algal grazing cichlids of Lake Malawi in Africa. Some populations are reportedly involved in cleaning other fish of parasites. It also eats chironomid larvae, and is more efficient at winnowing through soft sediment on the river-bed than might be expected from the shape of its snout, moving large quantities of sand with its mouth and sweeping sand away with its fins and tail.

It uses the same skills when excavating a hole for its nest. Like all cichlids, brood care is highly developed with both parents involved in fry raising. Colouration changes dramatically (see pictures) while breeding.
