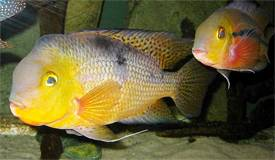

Conservation status
- Least Concern (IUCN 3.1)

Scientific classification
- Kingdom: Animalia
- Phylum: Chordata
- Class: Actinopterygii
- Order: Cichliformes
- Family: Cichlidae
- Subfamily: Cichlinae
- Tribe: Heroini
- Genus: Hypsophrys; Agassiz, 1859
- Species: H. nicaraguensis

Binomial name
- Hypsophrys nicaraguensis (Albert Günther, 1864)

Synonyms
- Heros nicaraguensis Günther, 1864; Cichlasoma nicaraguense (Günther, 1864); Copora nicaraguensis (Günther, 1864); Hypsophrys unimaculatus Agassiz, 1859; Heros balteatus T.N. Gill, 1877; Cichlasoma balteatum' (T.N. Gill, 1877); Cichlasoma spilotum Meek, 1912

= Hypsophrys =

Genus of fishes

Hypsophrys is a monospecific genus of freshwater ray-finned fish belonging to the family Cichlidae, the cichlids. The only species in this genus is Hypsophrys unimaculatus, the moga, butterfly cichlid, macaw cichlid, parrot cichlid or Nicaragua cichlid, a fish found on the Atlantic slope of Central America.

== Taxonomy ==
Hypsophrys was first proposed as a monospecific genus by the Swiss-born American naturalist Louis Agassiz in 1859 when he named Hypsophrys unimaculatus, describing it only as "A second genus, resembling Chrysophrys, he called Hypsophrys unimaculatus", which would normally be regarded as invalid, as no distinguishing details were given. Hypsophrys nicaraguensis was first formally described as Heros nicaraguensis in 1864 by the German-born British herpetologist and ichthyologist Albert Günther, with its type locality given as Lake Nicaragua in Nicaragua. H. unimaculatus is treated as a senior synonym of H. nicaraguensis, and is the type species of the genus Hypsophrys by monotypy. This taxon is classified within the tribe Heroini of the subfamily Cichlinae, the American cichlids, of the family Cichlidae, within the order Cichliformes.

Neetroplus nematopus, the poor man's tropheus, was briefly brought into Hypsophrys from the monotypic genus Neetroplus in 2007. However, genetic analysis in 2016 demonstrated that the poor man's tropheus should be in a separate genus, and resurrected Neetroplus, restating the old scientific name, Neetroplus nematopus.

== Etymology ==
Hypsophryss combines hypso, meaning "high", with ophrys, which means "eyebrow", an allusion Agassiz did not explain, nor is it clear. It may be related to Agassiz's observation that this taxon looked lie Chrysophrys. The specific name, nicaraguensis, refers to the type localaity of Lake Nicaragua.

== Description ==
Hypsophrys has a fusiform, laterally compressed body. The dorsal fin is supported by 18 or 19 spines and between 9 and 11 soft rays, while the anal fin contains 7 or spines and between 7 and 9 soft rays. There is a dark line which runs along the mid-flank, with a large black blotch located in the centre of the flank. The head has a very curved profile, and the mouth is on the lower part of the head. The males have scales with dark edges, creating a network-like pattern, and there are many dark spots on the fin, with a red margin to the dorsal fin. They also have an iridescent, greenish-blue head, and gold to coppery bodies. This species has a maximum standard length of 16.5 cm (6.5 in).

== Distribution and habitat ==
Hypsophrys is endemic to the Atlantic slope of Central America, with a disjunct range that extends from the Coco River in southern Honduras and Nicaragua, and the drainage basin of Lake Nicaragua as far south as the Matina River in Costa Rica. It may have been introduced to Hawaii and the Philippines. This species is found in lakes and rivers with slow to moderate currents, at elevations between 5 and 200 m (16 and 656 ft).

== Biology ==
Hypsophrys nicaraguensis feed on aquatic insects as juveniles, while adults feed on bottom detritus, seeds and leaves, as well as on snails and other molluscs.

The females each deposit between 200 and 400 eggs in a shallow, excavated depression, and the eggs are guarded by a small group of females, a behaviour known as creching. These guard the combined spawning area from conspecifics and potential predators.

== Utilistation ==
Hypsophrys are targeted by subsistence and artisanal fishermen, particularly around Lake Nicaragua. Hypsophrys nicaraguensis is also a popular aquarium fish.
