= Acoustic communication =

Acoustic communication means communication by means of sound, such as:

- Underwater acoustic communication
- Acoustic communication in aquatic animals
- Acoustic communication in fish
- Auditory animal communication
- Human speech
- Bird vocalization
