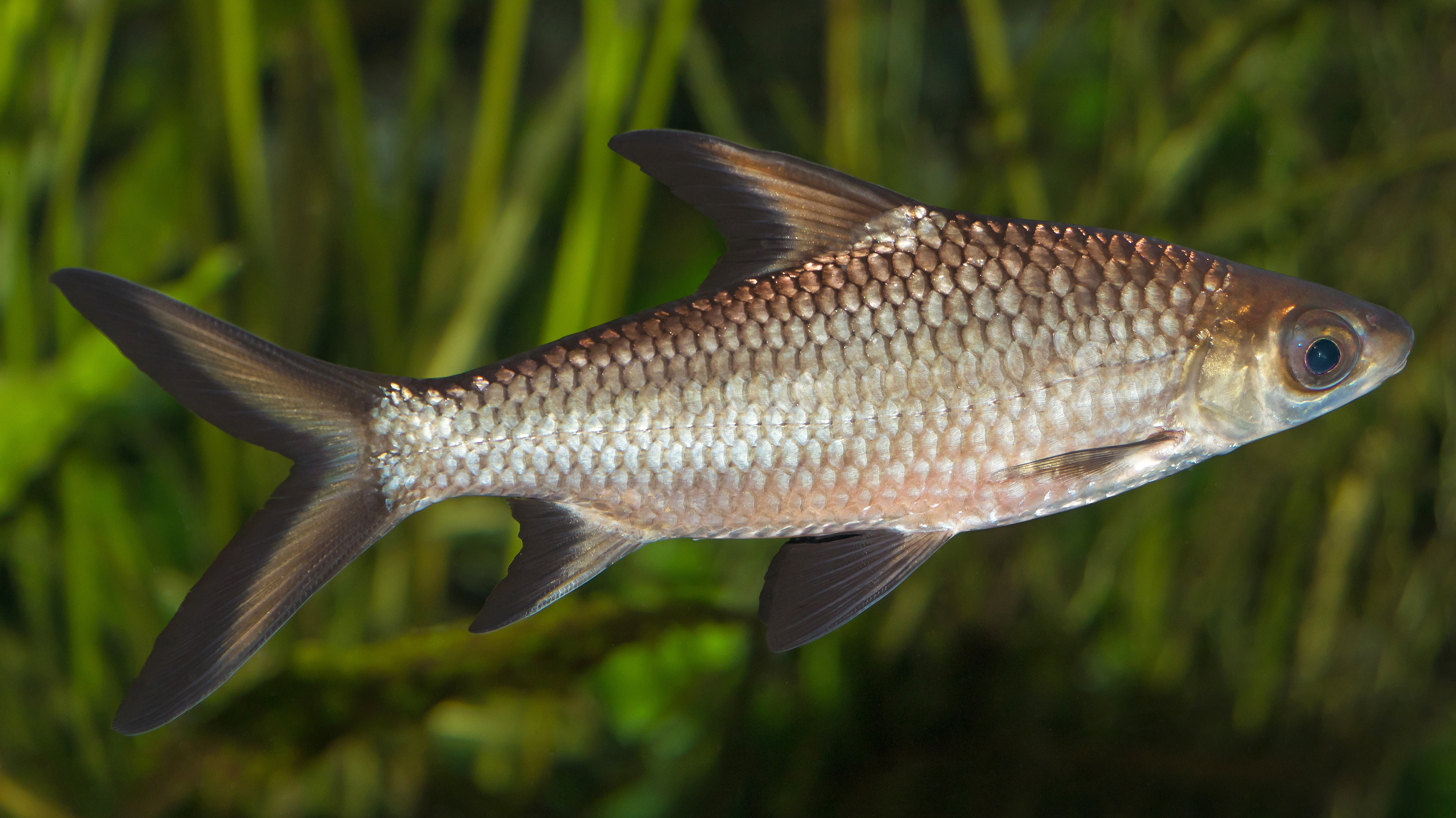
- Bala shark, a bony fish

Scientific classification
- Kingdom: Animalia
- Phylum: Chordata
- Clade: Olfactores
- Subphylum: Vertebrata

Groups included
- "Agnatha"; †"Placodermi"; †"Acanthodii"; Chondrichthyes; Osteichthyes; Actinopterygii; Sarcopterygii (including tetrapods)

Cladistically included but traditionally excluded taxa
- Tetrapoda

= Fish =

Fish Temporal range: 535–0 Ma Cambrian – Recent

Gill-bearing non-tetrapod aquatic vertebrates

A fish is an aquatic, anamniotic, gill-bearing vertebrate with a tough cranium to protect the brain. Many fish have fins that they use for directional stability and propulsion. Fish can be grouped into the more basal jawless fish and the more common jawed fish, the latter including all living cartilaginous and bony fish, as well as the extinct placoderms and acanthodians. Tetrapods are descended from fish, so in a break from the long tradition of grouping all fish into a single class (Pisces), modern phylogenetics views fish as a paraphyletic group that includes all vertebrates except tetrapods. To treat fish as a monophyletic group, one would have to classify tetrapods as a clade/subgroup of specialized fish, which would make "fish" and "vertebrates" synonyms. In English, the plural of "fish" is fish when referring to individuals and fishes when referring to species.

Most fish are cold-blooded, their body temperature varying with the surrounding water, though some large, active swimmers like the white shark and tuna can maintain a higher core temperature. Many fish can communicate acoustically with each other, such as during courtship displays. The study of fish is known as ichthyology.

There are over 33,000 extant species of fish, easily the largest group of vertebrates and more than all species of the other traditional classes, namely amphibians, reptiles, birds, and mammals, combined. Most fish belong to the class Actinopterygii, the ray-finned fishes, which accounts for approximately half of all living vertebrates.

The earliest fish appeared during the Cambrian as small filter feeders; they continued to evolve through the Paleozoic, diversifying into many forms. The earliest fish with dedicated respiratory gills and paired fins, the ostracoderms, had heavy bony plates that served as protective exoskeletons against invertebrate predators. The first fish with jaws, the placoderms, appeared in the Silurian and greatly diversified during the Devonian, the "Age of Fishes".

Bony fish, distinguished by the presence of swim bladders and later ossified endoskeletons, emerged as the dominant group of fish after the end-Devonian extinction wiped out the apex predators, the placoderms. Bony fish are further divided into lobe-finned and ray-finned fishes. About 96% of all living fish species today are teleosts- a crown group of ray-finned fish that can protrude their jaws. The tetrapods, a mostly terrestrial clade of vertebrates that have dominated the top trophic levels in both aquatic and terrestrial ecosystems since the Late Paleozoic, evolved from lobe-finned fish during the Carboniferous, developing air-breathing lungs homologous to swim bladders.

Fish have been an important natural resource for humans since prehistoric times, especially as food. Commercial and subsistence fishers harvest fish in wild fisheries or farm them in ponds or breeding cages in the ocean. Fish are caught for recreation or raised by fishkeepers as ornaments for private and public exhibition in aquaria and garden ponds. Fish have had a role in human culture through the ages, serving as deities, religious symbols, and as the subjects of art, books and movies.

== Etymology ==
The word fish is inherited from Proto-Germanic, and is related to German Fisch, the Latin piscis, and Old Irish íasc, though the exact root is unknown; some authorities reconstruct a Proto-Indo-European root *peysk-, attested only in Italic, Celtic, and Germanic.

Though often used interchangeably, in biology fish and fishes have different meanings. Fish is used as a singular noun, or as a plural to describe multiple individuals from a single species. Fishes is used to describe different species or species groups.

== Evolution ==
=== Fossil history ===
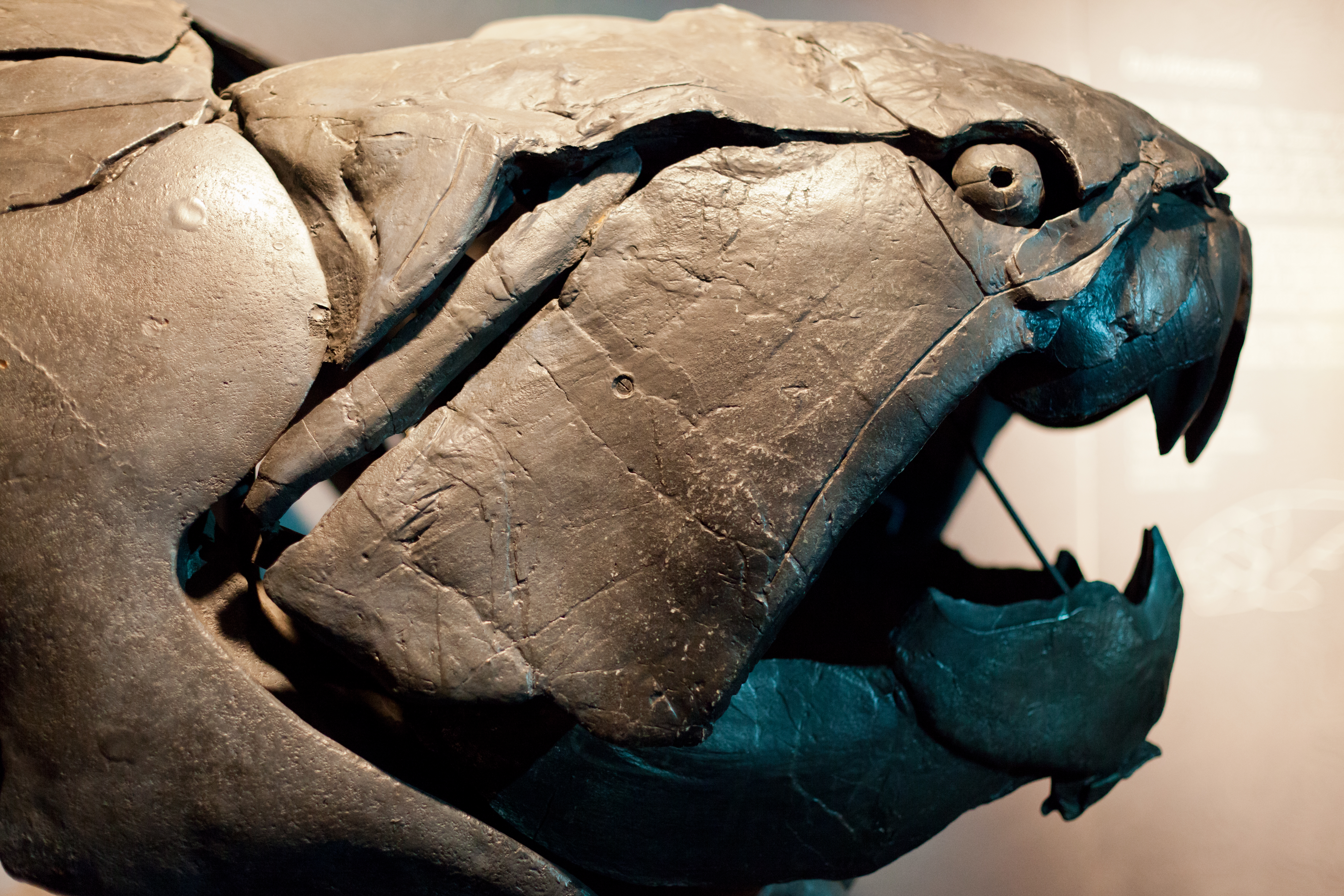
Dunkleosteus was a giant Devonian armoured placoderm, c. 400 mya.

About 530 million years ago during the Cambrian explosion, fishlike animals with a notochord and eyes at the front of the body, such as Haikouichthys, appear in the fossil record. During the late Cambrian, other jawless forms such as conodonts appear.

Jawed vertebrates appear in the Silurian, with giant armoured placoderms such as Dunkleosteus. Jawed fish, too, appeared during the Silurian: the cartilaginous Chondrichthyes and the bony Osteichthyes.

During the Devonian, fish diversity greatly increased, including among the placoderms, lobe-finned fishes, and early sharks, earning the Devonian the epithet "the age of fishes".

=== Phylogeny ===
Fishes are a paraphyletic group, since any clade containing all jawed fish (Gnathostomata) or all bony fish (Osteichthyes) also contains the clade of tetrapods (four-limbed vertebrates, mostly terrestrial), which are usually not considered fish. Some tetrapods, such as cetaceans and ichthyosaurs, have secondarily acquired a fish-like body shape through convergent evolution. On the other hand, Fishes of the World comments that "it is increasingly widely accepted that tetrapods, including ourselves, are simply modified bony fishes, and so we are comfortable with using the taxon Osteichthyes as a clade, which now includes all tetrapods".

The biodiversity of extant fish is unevenly distributed among the various groups; teleosts, bony fishes able to protrude their jaws, make up 96% of fish species. The cladogram shows the evolutionary relationships of all groups of living fishes (with their respective diversity) and the tetrapods. Extinct groups are marked with a dagger (†); groups of uncertain placement are labelled with a question mark (?) and dashed lines (- - - - -). Groups with over 25,000 species are in boldface.

- Vertebrates
  - Cyclostomi (118 species: hagfish, lampreys)
  - - ?
      †Thelodonti, †Conodonta, †Anaspida
    - - †Galeaspida
      - - †Osteostraci
        - Jawed vertebrates
          - †Placodermi
          - - ?
              †Acanthodii
            - - Chondrichthyes
                (>1,100 species: sharks, rays, chimaeras)
              - Osteichthyes
                - - Lobe-finned fish
                    - Actinistia
                      (2 species: coelacanths)
                    - Rhipidistia
                      - Dipnoi (6 species: lungfish)
                      - **Tetrapoda** (>38,000 terrestrial species, not considered fish)
                  - Ray-finned fish
                    - Cladistia
                      (14 species: bichirs, reedfish)
                    - Actinopteri
                      - Chondrostei
                        (27 species: sturgeons, paddlefish)
                      - Neopterygii
                        - - Holostei
                            - Ginglymodi (7 species: gars, alligator gars)
                            - Halecomorphi (2 species: bowfin, eyetail bowfin)
                          - **Teleostei**
                            (>32,000 species)

=== Taxonomy ===
Fishes (without tetrapods) are a paraphyletic group and for this reason, the class Pisces seen in older reference works is no longer used in formal classifications. Traditional classification divides fish into three extant classes ("Agnatha", Chondrichthyes, and "Osteichthyes"), and with extinct forms sometimes classified within those groups, sometimes as their own classes.

Fish account for more than half of vertebrate species. As of 2016, there are over 32,000 described species of bony fish, over 1,100 species of cartilaginous fish, and over 100 hagfish and lampreys. A third of these fall within the nine largest families; from largest to smallest, these are Cyprinidae, Gobiidae, Cichlidae, Characidae, Loricariidae, Balitoridae, Serranidae, Labridae, and Scorpaenidae. About 64 families are monotypic, containing only one species.

=== Diversity ===
Fish range in size from the huge 16-metre (52 ft) whale shark to some tiny teleosts only 8-millimetre (0.3 in) long, such as the cyprinid Paedocypris progenetica and the stout infantfish.

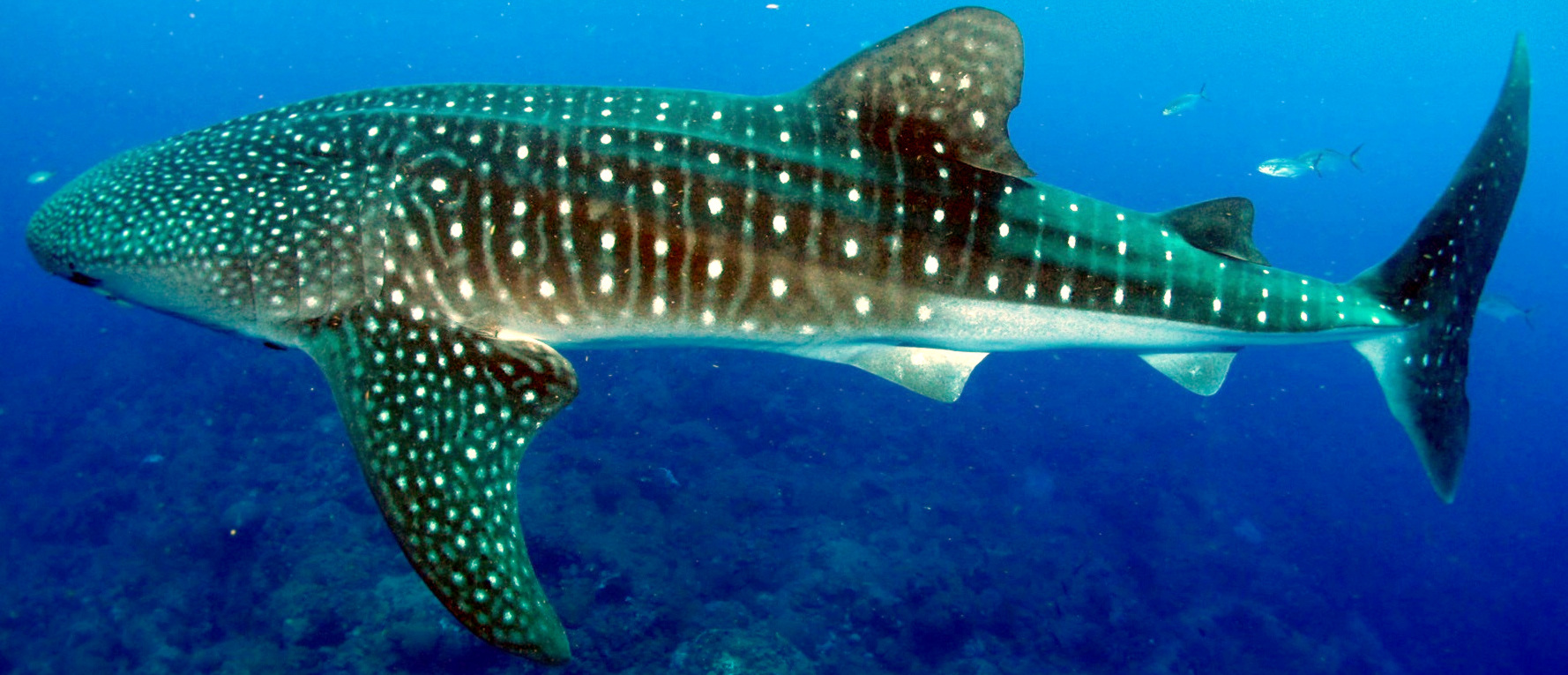
Largest: whale shark

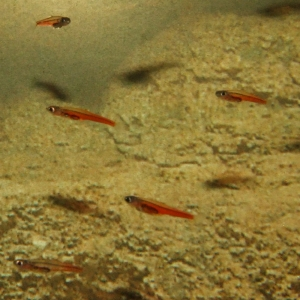
Smallest: e.g. Paedocypris progenetica

Swimming performance varies from fish such as tuna, salmon, and jacks that can cover 10–20 body-lengths per second to species such as eels and rays that swim no more than 0.5 body-lengths per second.

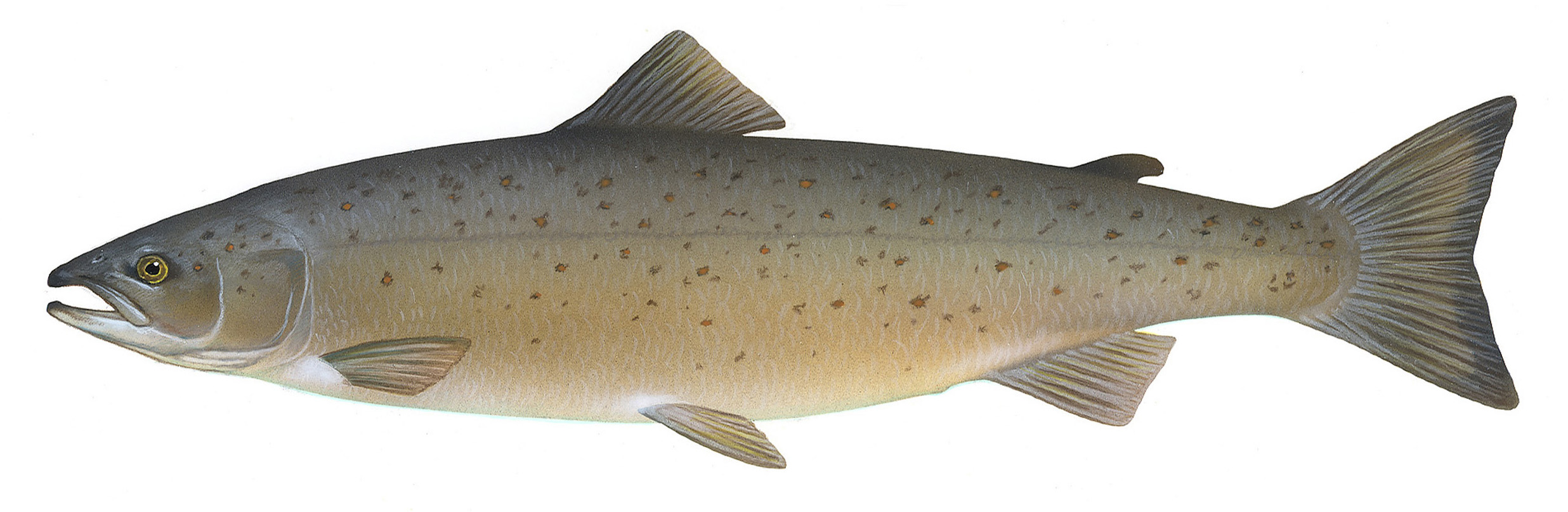
Fastest: e.g. salmon, 10–20 body lengths/second

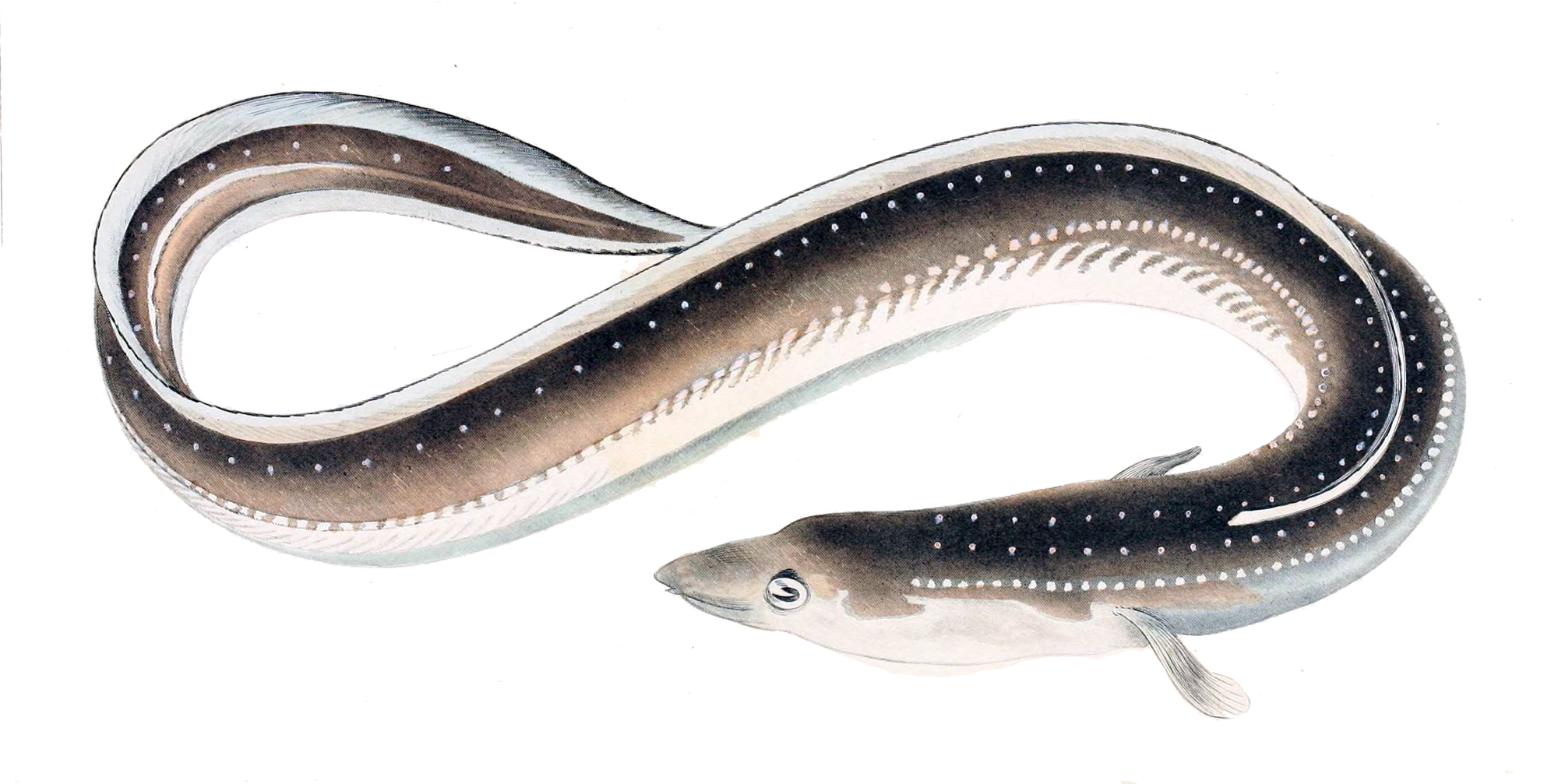
Slowest: e.g. eel, 0.5 body lengths/second

A typical fish is cold-blooded, has a streamlined body for rapid swimming, extracts oxygen from water using gills, has two sets of paired fins, one or two dorsal fins, an anal fin and a tail fin, jaws, skin covered with scales, and lays eggs. Each criterion has exceptions, creating a wide diversity in body shape and way of life. For example, some fast-swimming fish are warm-blooded, while some slow-swimming fish have abandoned streamlining in favour of other body shapes.

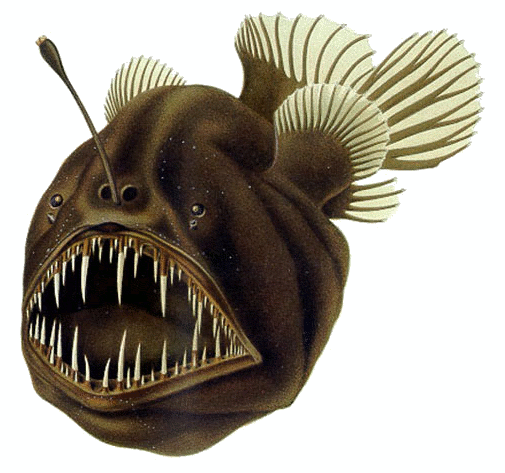
Ambush predator:
anglerfish

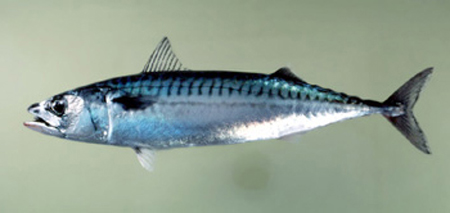
Streamlined, somewhat warm-blooded:
mackerel

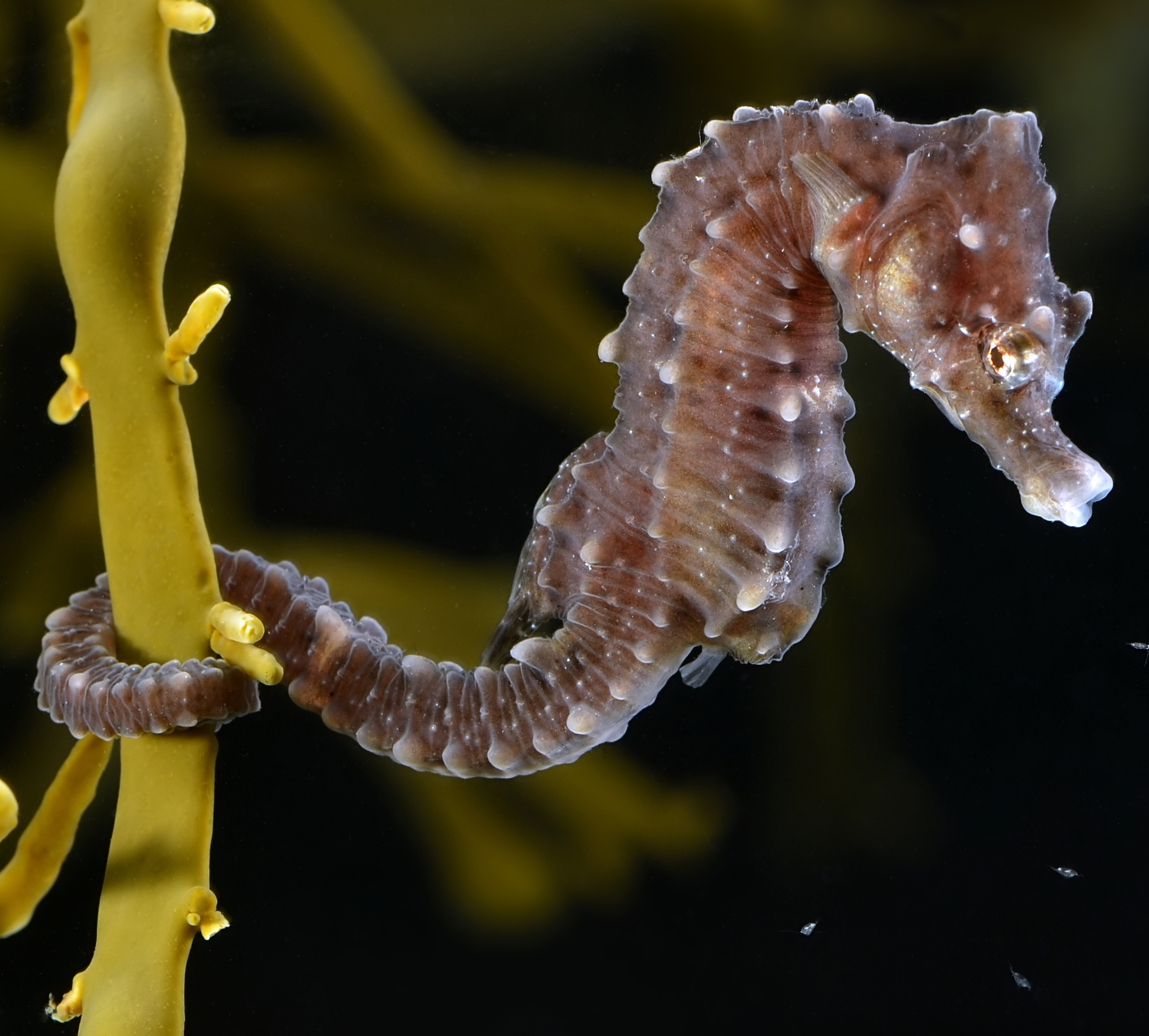
Tail not used for swimming:
seahorse

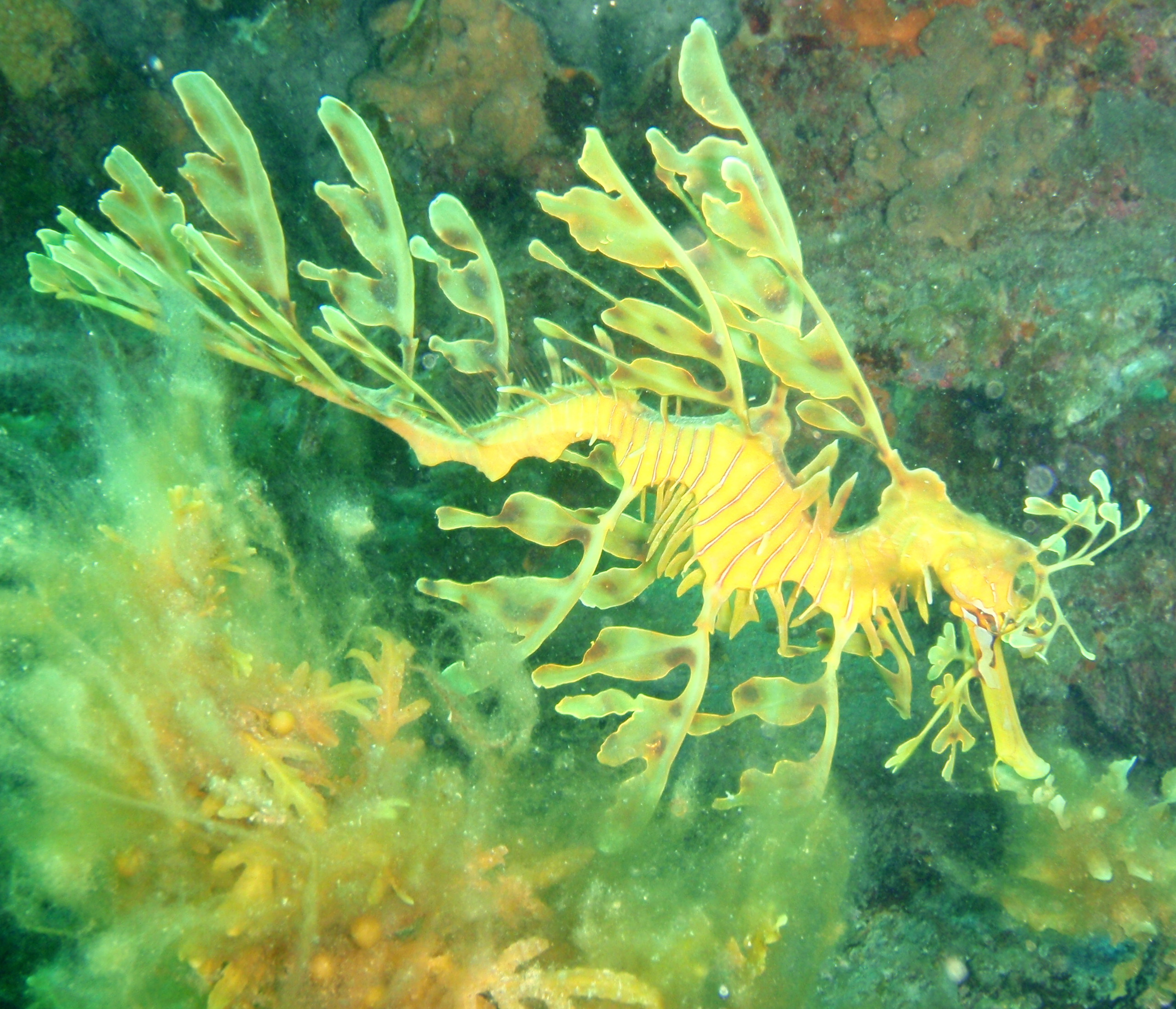
Camouflaged:
leafy seadragon

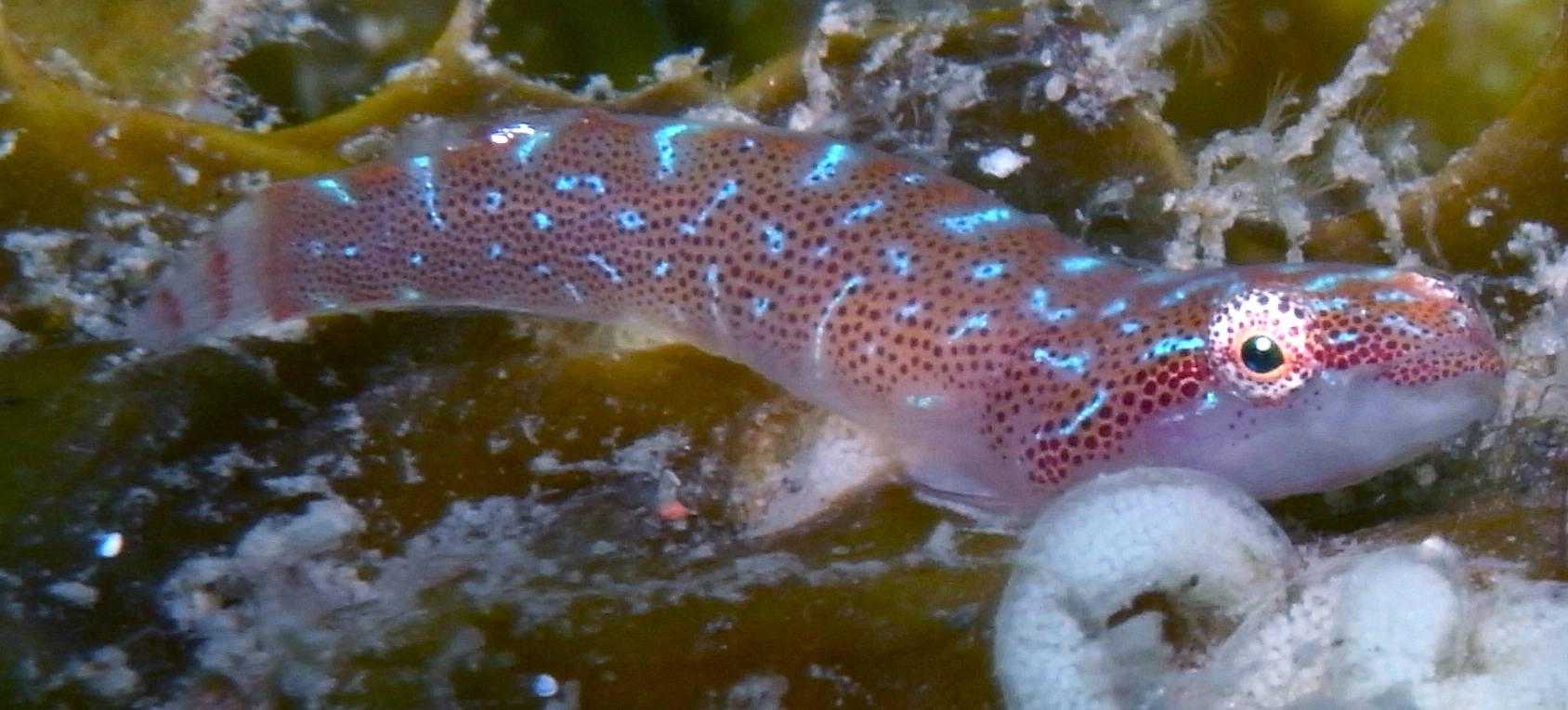
No scales:
clingfish

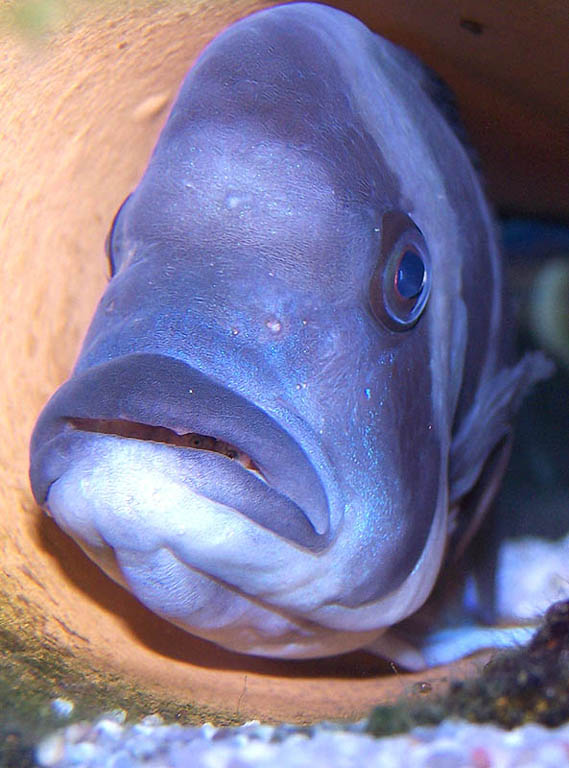
Mouthbrooder: front cichlid with young in mouth

== Ecology ==
=== Habitats ===
Different fish species are adapted to a wide variety of freshwater and marine habitats.

Fish species are roughly divided equally between freshwater and marine (oceanic) ecosystems; there are some 15,200 freshwater species and around 14,800 marine species. Coral reefs in the Indo-Pacific constitute the center of diversity for marine fishes, whereas continental freshwater fishes are most diverse in large river basins of tropical rainforests, especially the Amazon, Congo, and Mekong basins. More than 5,600 fish species inhabit Neotropical freshwaters alone, such that Neotropical fishes represent about 10% of all vertebrate species on the Earth.

Fish are abundant in most bodies of water. They can be found in nearly all aquatic environments, from high mountain streams (e.g., char and gudgeon) to the abyssal and even hadal depths of the deepest oceans (e.g., cusk-eels and snailfish), although none have been found in the deepest 25% of the ocean. The deepest living fish in the ocean so far found is a cusk-eel, Abyssobrotula galatheae, recorded at the bottom of the Puerto Rico Trench at 8,370 m (27,460 ft).

In terms of temperature, Jonah's icefish live in cold (Note: The temperature is often around 0 °C. The freezing point of seawater at the surface is −1.85 °C, falling to −2.62 °C at a depth of 1000 metres. However, the water can be supercooled somewhat below these temperatures.) waters of the Southern Ocean, including under the Filchner–Ronne Ice Shelf at a latitude of 79°S, while desert pupfish live in desert springs, streams, and marshes, sometimes highly saline, with water temperatures as high as 36 C.

A few fish live mostly on land or lay their eggs on land near water. Mudskippers feed and interact with one another on mudflats and go underwater to hide in their burrows. A single undescribed species of Phreatobius has been called a true "land fish" as this worm-like catfish strictly lives among waterlogged leaf litter. Cavefish of multiple families live in underground lakes, underground rivers or aquifers.

=== Parasites and predators ===
Like other animals, fish suffer from parasitism. Some species use cleaner fish to remove external parasites. The best known of these are the bluestreak cleaner wrasses of coral reefs in the Indian and Pacific oceans. These small fish maintain cleaning stations where other fish congregate and perform specific movements to attract the attention of the cleaners. Cleaning behaviors have been observed in a number of fish groups, including an interesting case between two cichlids of the same genus, Etroplus maculatus, the cleaner, and the much larger E. suratensis.

Fish occupy many trophic levels in freshwater and marine food webs. Fish at the higher levels are predatory, and a substantial part of their prey consists of other fish. In addition, mammals such as dolphins and seals feed on fish, alongside birds such as gannets and cormorants.

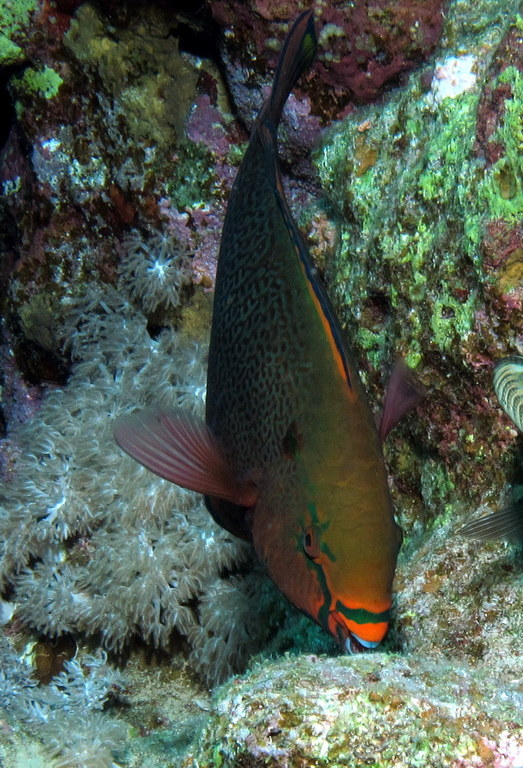
A parrotfish feeding on algae on a coral reef

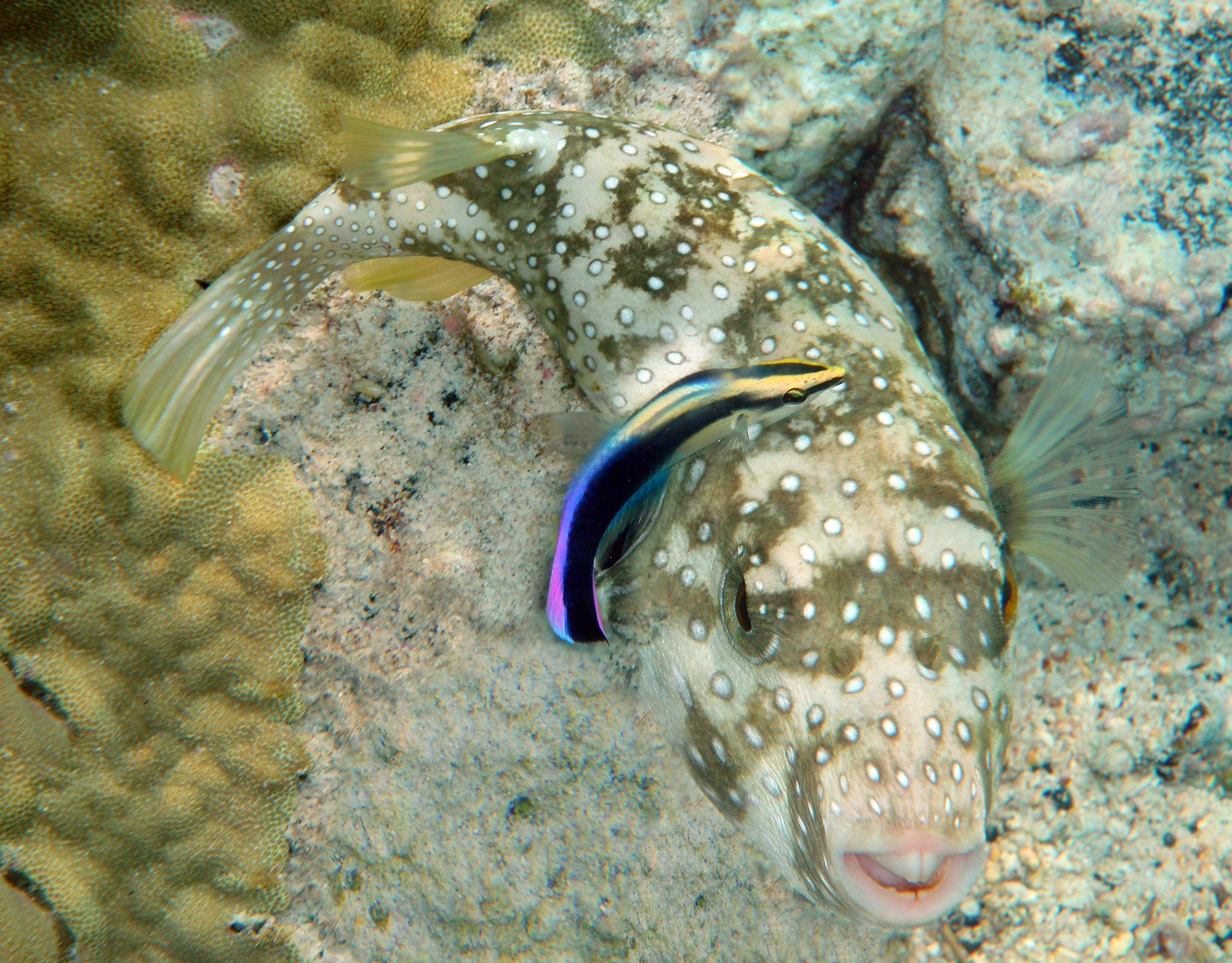
A cleaner fish removing parasites from its client, a pufferfish

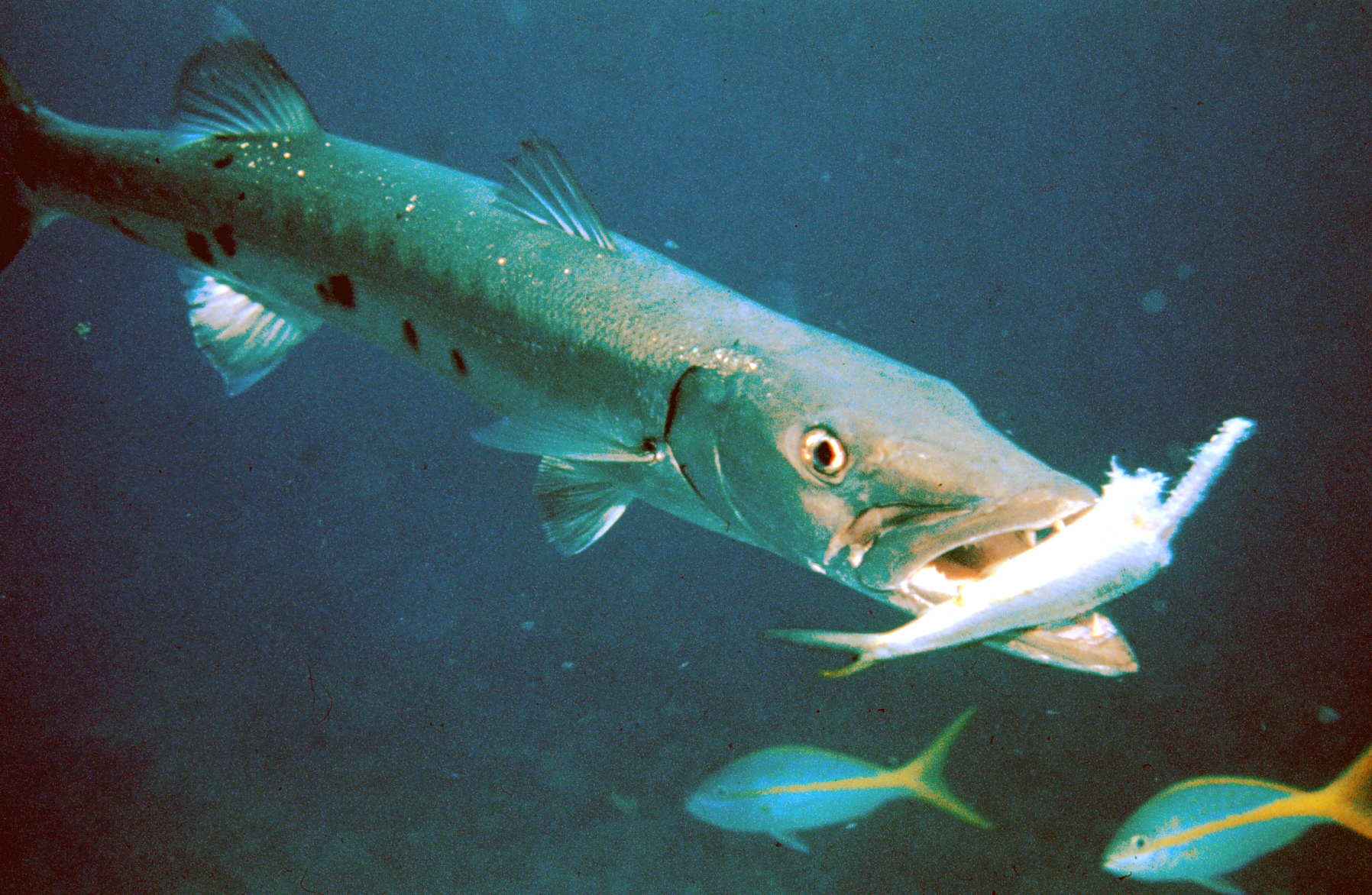
A barracuda preying on a smaller fish

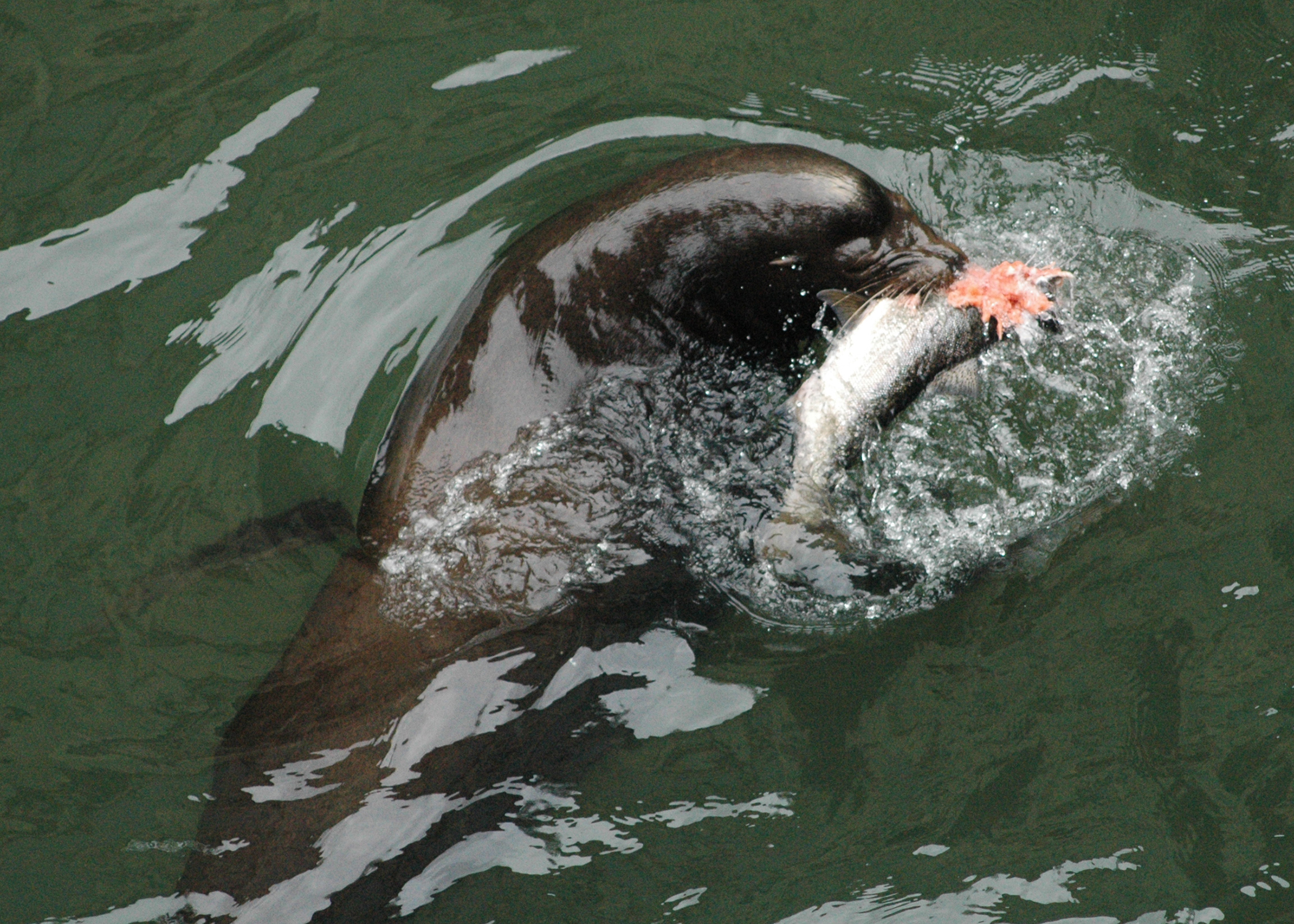
Sea lion, a predatory mammal, eating a large salmonid

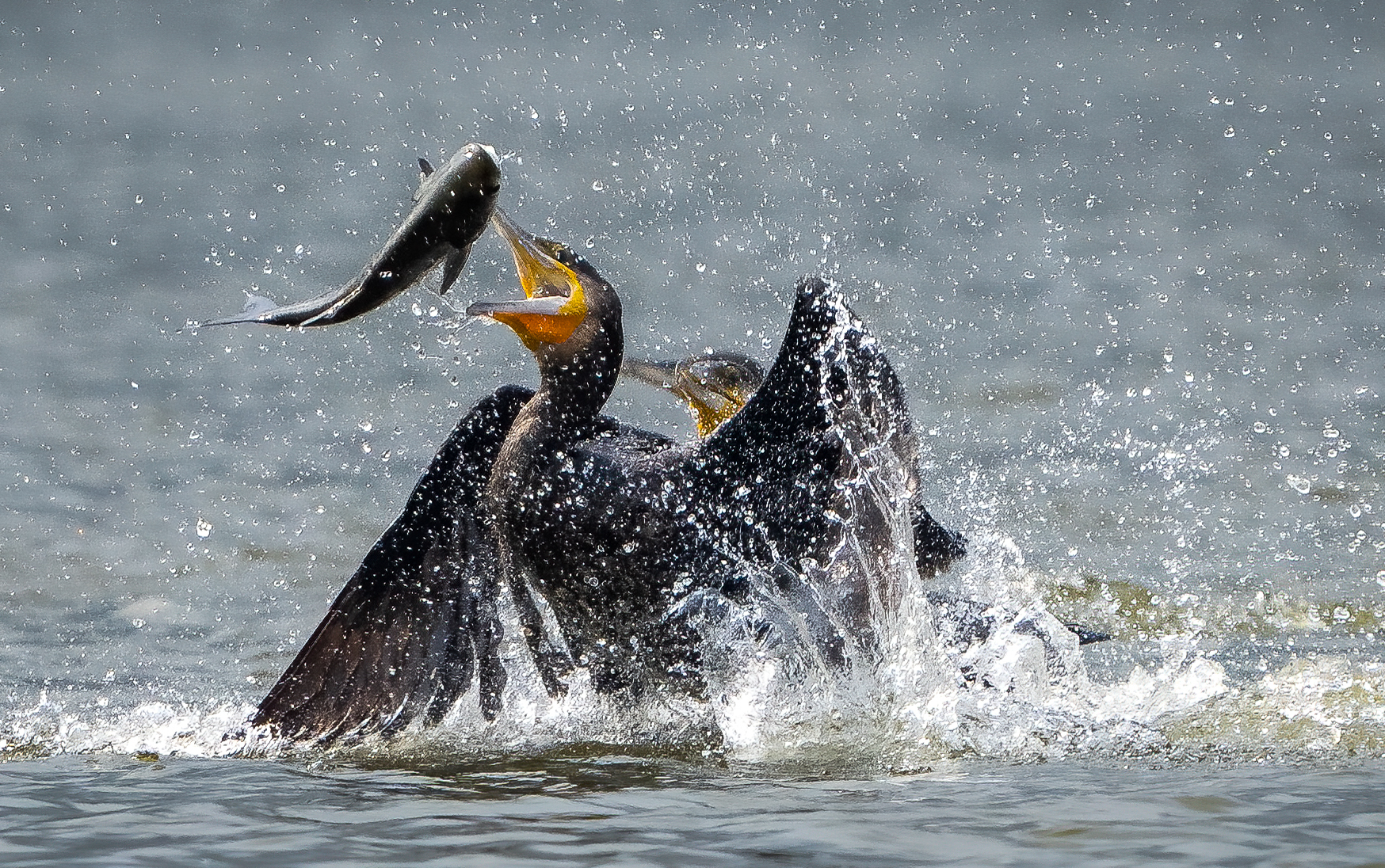
Cormorant with fish prey

== Anatomy and physiology ==
=== Locomotion ===
The body of a typical fish is adapted for efficient swimming by alternately contracting paired sets of muscles on either side of the backbone. These contractions form S-shaped curves that move down the body. As each curve reaches the tail fin, force is applied to the water, moving the fish forward. The other fins act as control surfaces like an aircraft's flaps, enabling the fish to steer in any direction.

Anatomy of a typical fish (lanternfish shown):
1) gill cover 2) lateral line 3) dorsal fin 4) fat fin
5) caudal peduncle 6) caudal fin 7) anal fin 8) photophores 9) pelvic fins 10) pectoral fins

Since body tissue is denser than water, fish must compensate for the difference or they will sink. Many bony fish have an internal organ called a swim bladder that allows them to adjust their buoyancy by increasing or decreasing the amount of gas it contains.

The scales of fish provide protection from predators at the cost of adding stiffness and weight. Fish scales are often highly reflective; this silvering provides camouflage in the open ocean. Because the water all around is the same colour, reflecting an image of the water offers near-invisibility.

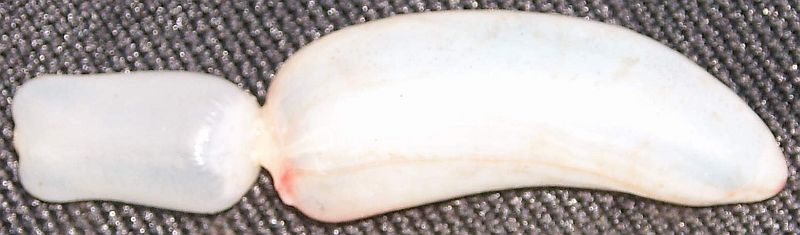
Gas-filled swim bladder of a rudd helps maintain neutral buoyancy.

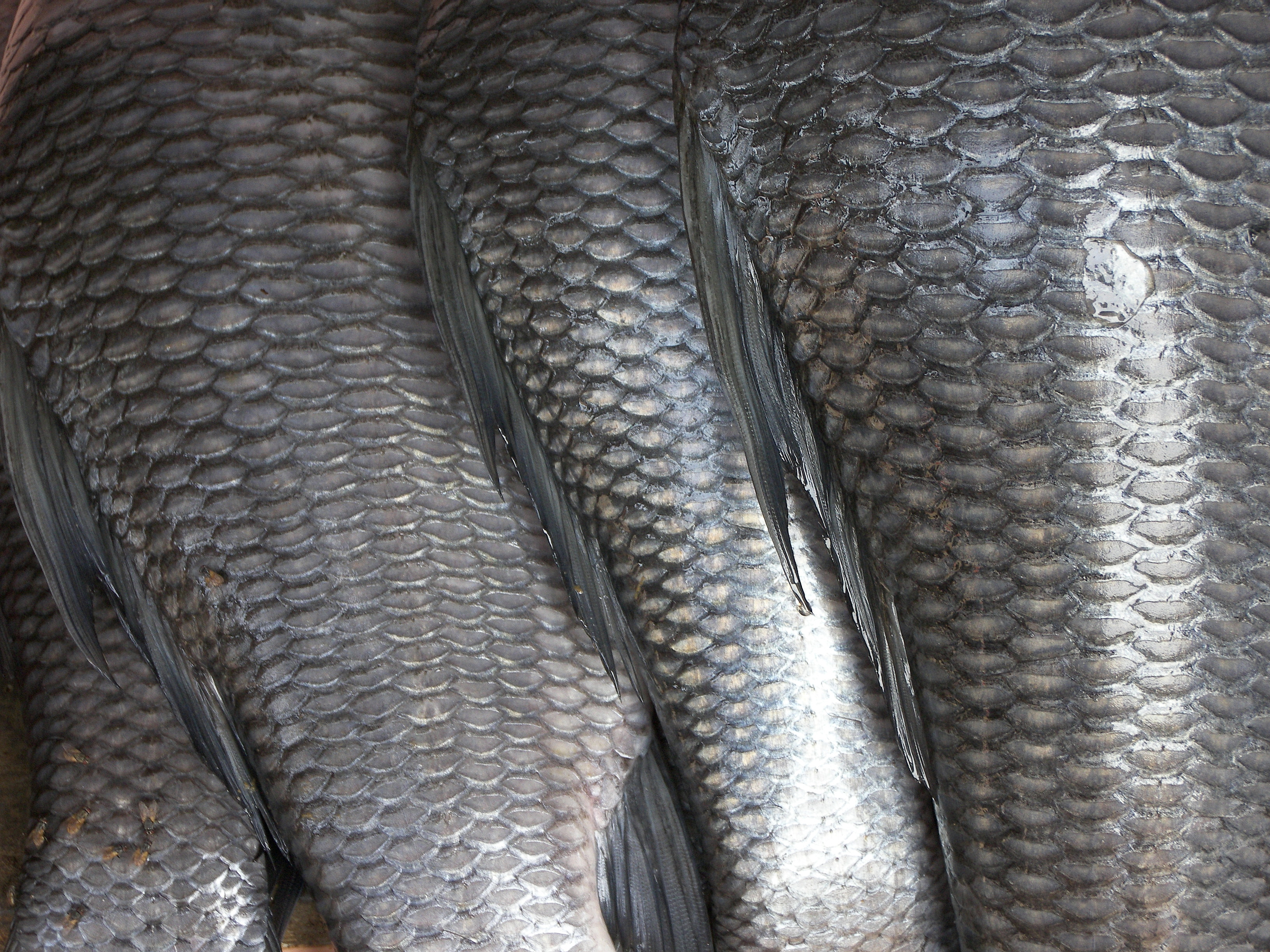
Silvered scales of a rohu provide protection and camouflage.

=== Circulation ===
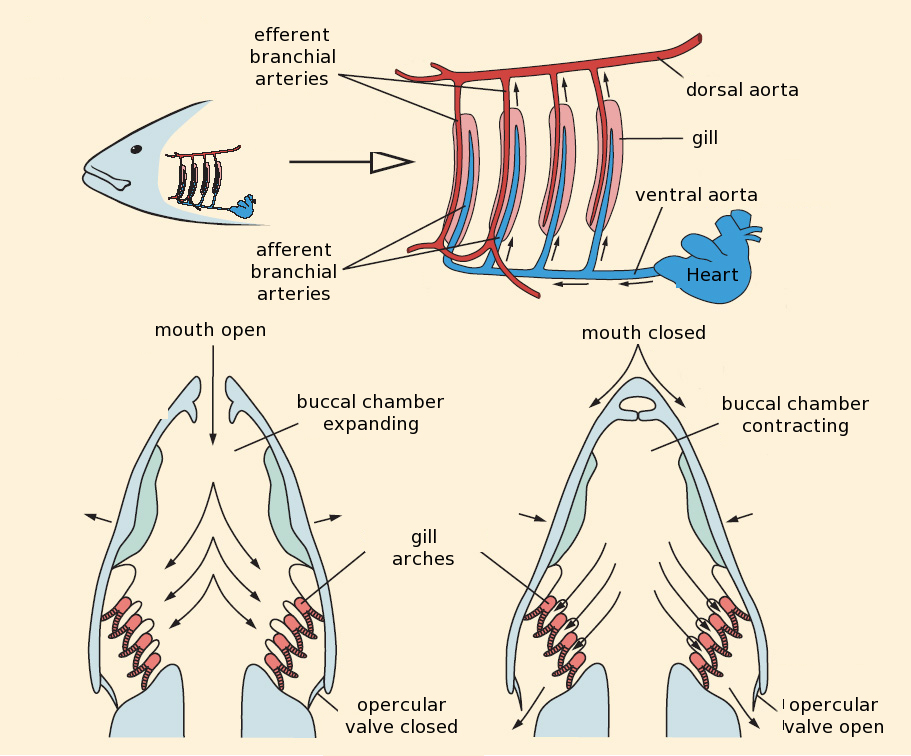
The fish heart pumps blood to the gills, where it picks up oxygen. The blood then flows without further pumping to the body, from where it returns to the heart.

Fish have a closed-loop circulatory system. The heart pumps the blood in a single loop throughout the body; for comparison, the mammal heart has two loops, one for the lungs to pick up oxygen, one for the body to deliver the oxygen. In fish, the heart pumps blood through the gills. Oxygen-rich blood then flows without further pumping, unlike in mammals, to the body tissues. Finally, oxygen-depleted blood returns to the heart.

=== Respiration ===
==== Gills ====
Fish exchange gases using gills on either side of the pharynx. Gills consist of comblike structures called filaments. Each filament contains a capillary network that provides a large surface area for exchanging oxygen and carbon dioxide. Fish exchange gases by pulling oxygen-rich water through their mouths and pumping it over their gills. Capillary blood in the gills flows in the opposite direction to the water, resulting in efficient countercurrent exchange. The gills push the oxygen-poor water out through openings in the sides of the pharynx. Cartilaginous fish have multiple gill openings: sharks usually have five, sometimes six or seven pairs; they often have to swim to oxygenate their gills. Bony fish have a single gill opening on each side, hidden beneath a protective bony cover or operculum. They are able to oxygenate their gills using muscles in the head.

==== Air breathing ====
Some 400 species of fish in 50 families can breathe air, enabling them to live in oxygen-poor water or to emerge on to land. The ability of fish to do this is potentially limited by their single-loop circulation, as oxygenated blood from their air-breathing organ will mix with deoxygenated blood returning to the heart from the rest of the body. Lungfish, bichirs, ropefish, bowfins, snakefish, and the African knifefish have evolved to reduce such mixing, and to reduce oxygen loss from the gills to oxygen-poor water.

Bichirs and lungfish have tetrapod-like paired lungs, requiring them to surface to gulp air, and making them obligate air breathers. Many other fish, including inhabitants of rock pools and the intertidal zone, are facultative air breathers, able to breathe air when out of water, as may occur daily at low tide, and to use their gills when in water. Some coastal fish like rockskippers and mudskippers choose to leave the water to feed in habitats temporarily exposed to the air. Some catfish absorb air through their digestive tracts.

=== Digestion ===
The digestive system consists of a tube, the gut, leading from the mouth to the anus. The mouth of most fishes contains teeth to grip prey, bite off or scrape plant material, or crush the food. An esophagus carries food to the stomach where it may be stored and partially digested. A sphincter, the pylorus, releases food to the intestine at intervals. Many fish have finger-shaped pouches, pyloric caeca, around the pylorus, of doubtful function. The pancreas secretes enzymes into the intestine to digest the food; other enzymes are secreted directly by the intestine itself. The liver produces bile which helps to break up fat into an emulsion which can be absorbed in the intestine.

=== Excretion ===
Most fish release their nitrogenous wastes as ammonia. This may be excreted through the gills or filtered by the kidneys. Salt is excreted by the rectal gland. Saltwater fish tend to lose water by osmosis; their kidneys return water to the body, and produce a concentrated urine. The reverse happens in freshwater fish: they tend to gain water osmotically, and produce a dilute urine. Some fish have kidneys able to operate in both freshwater and saltwater.

=== Brain ===
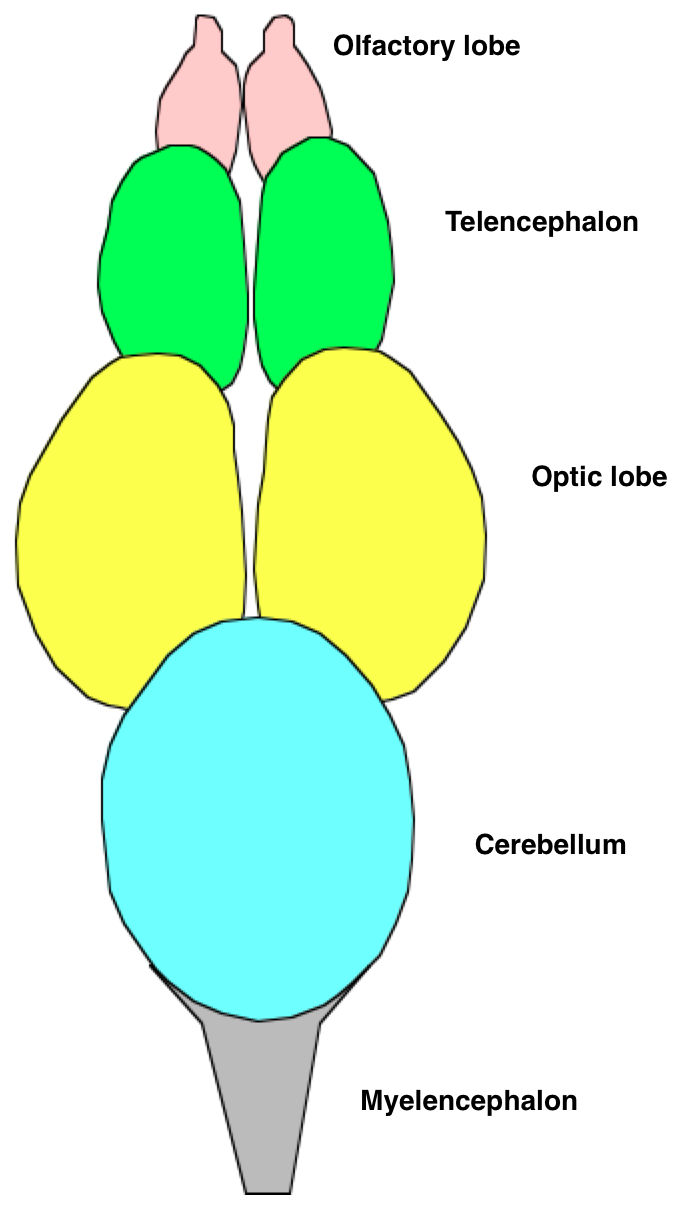
A diagram of rainbow trout brain, from above

Fish have small brains relative to body size compared with other vertebrates, typically one-fifteenth the brain mass of a similarly sized bird or mammal. However, some fish have relatively large brains, notably mormyrids and sharks, which have brains about as large for their body weight as birds and marsupials. At the front of the brain are the olfactory lobes, a pair of structures that receive and process signals from the nostrils via the two olfactory nerves.

Fish that hunt primarily by smell, such as hagfish and sharks, have very large olfactory lobes. Behind these is the telencephalon, which in fish deals mostly with olfaction. Together these structures form the forebrain. Connecting the forebrain to the midbrain is the diencephalon; it works with hormones and homeostasis. The pineal body is just above the diencephalon; it detects light, maintains circadian rhythms, and controls color changes.

The midbrain contains the two optic lobes. These are very large in species that hunt by sight, such as rainbow trout and cichlids. The hindbrain controls swimming and balance. The single-lobed cerebellum is the biggest part of the brain; it is small in hagfish and lampreys, but very large in mormyrids, processing their electrical sense. The brain stem or myelencephalon controls some muscles and body organs, and governs respiration and osmoregulation.

=== Sensory systems ===
The lateral line system is a network of sensors in the skin which detects gentle currents and vibrations, and senses the motion of nearby fish, whether predators or prey. This can be considered both a sense of touch and of hearing. Blind cave fish navigate almost entirely through the sensations from their lateral line system. Some fish, such as catfish and sharks, have the ampullae of Lorenzini, electroreceptors that detect weak electric currents on the order of millivolt.

Vision is an important sensory system in fish. Fish eyes are similar to those of terrestrial vertebrates like birds and mammals, but have a more spherical lens. Their retinas generally have both rods and cones (for scotopic and photopic vision); many species have colour vision, often with three types of cone. Teleosts can see polarized light; some such as cyprinids have a fourth type of cone that detects ultraviolet. Amongst jawless fish, the lamprey has well-developed eyes, while the hagfish has only primitive eyespots.

Hearing too is an important sensory system in fish. Fish sense sound using their lateral lines and otoliths in their ears, inside their heads. Some can detect sound through the swim bladder.

Some fish, including salmon, are capable of magnetoreception; when the axis of a magnetic field is changed around a circular tank of young fish, they reorient themselves in line with the field. The mechanism of fish magnetoreception remains unknown; experiments in birds imply a quantum radical pair mechanism.

=== Cognition ===
The cognitive capacities of fish include self-awareness, as seen in mirror tests. Manta rays and wrasses placed in front of a mirror repeatedly check whether their reflection's behavior mimics their body movement. Choerodon wrasse, archerfish, and Atlantic cod can solve problems and invent tools. The monogamous cichlid Amatitlania siquia exhibits pessimistic behavior when prevented from being with its partner. Fish orient themselves using landmarks; they may use mental maps based on multiple landmarks. Fish are able to learn to traverse mazes, showing that they possess spatial memory and visual discrimination. Behavioral research suggests that fish are sentient, capable of experiencing pain.

=== Electrogenesis ===
The elephantnose fish is a weakly electric fish which generates an electric field with its electric organ and then uses its electroreceptive organs to locate objects by the distortions they cause in its electric field.

Electric fish such as elephantfishes, the African knifefish, and electric eels have some of their muscles adapted to generate electric fields. They use the field to locate and identify objects such as prey in the waters around them, which may be turbid or dark. Strongly electric fish like the electric eel can in addition use their electric organs to generate shocks powerful enough to stun their prey.

=== Endothermy ===
Most fish are exclusively cold-blooded or ectothermic. However, the Scombroidei are warm-blooded (endothermic), including the billfishes and tunas. The opah, a lampriform, uses whole-body endothermy, generating heat with its swimming muscles to warm its body while countercurrent exchange minimizes heat loss. Among the cartilaginous fishes, sharks of the families Lamnidae (such as the great white shark) and Alopiidae (thresher sharks) are endothermic. The degree of endothermy varies from the billfishes, which warm only their eyes and brain, to the bluefin tuna and the porbeagle shark, which maintain body temperatures more than 20 °C (68 °F) above the ambient water.

=== Reproduction and life-cycle ===
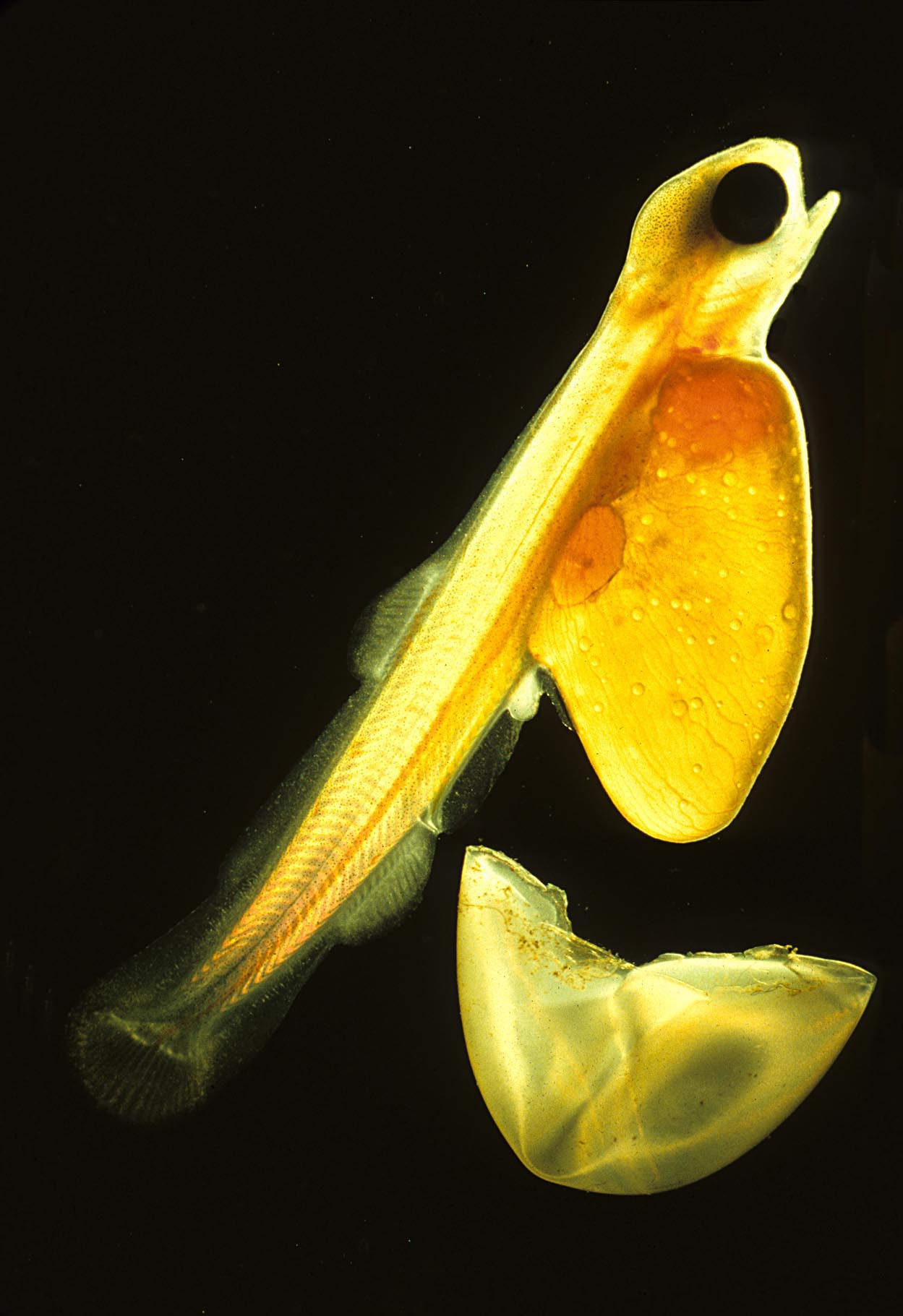
Salmon fry hatching from the egg, keeping its yolk sac

The primary reproductive organs are paired testicles and ovaries. Eggs are released from the ovary to the oviducts. Over 97% of fish, including salmon and goldfish, are oviparous, meaning that the eggs are shed into the water and develop outside the mother's body. The eggs are usually fertilized outside the mother's body, with the male and female fish shedding their gametes into the surrounding water. In a few oviparous fish, such as the skates, fertilization is internal: the male uses an intromittent organ to deliver sperm into the female's genital opening of the female.

Marine fish release large numbers of small eggs into the open water column. Newly hatched young of oviparous fish are planktonic larvae. They have a large yolk sac and do not resemble juvenile or adult fish. The larval period in oviparous fish is usually only some weeks, and larvae rapidly grow and change in structure to become juveniles. During this transition, larvae must switch from their yolk sac to feeding on zooplankton prey. Some fish such as surf-perches, splitfins, and lemon sharks are viviparous or live-bearing, meaning that the mother retains the eggs and nourishes the embryos via a structure analogous to the placenta to connect the mother's blood supply with the embryo's.

=== DNA repair ===
Embryos of externally fertilized fish species are directly exposed during their development to environmental conditions that may damage their DNA, such as pollutants, UV light and reactive oxygen species. To deal with such DNA damages, a variety of different DNA repair pathways are employed by fish embryos during their development. In recent years zebrafish have become a useful model for assessing environmental pollutants that might be genotoxic, i.e. cause DNA damage.

=== Defences against disease ===
Fish have both non-specific and immune defenses against disease. Non-specific defenses include the skin and scales, as well as the mucus layer secreted by the epidermis that traps and inhibits the growth of microorganisms. If pathogens breach these defenses, the innate immune system can mount an inflammatory response that increases blood flow to the infected region and delivers white blood cells that attempt to destroy pathogens, non-specifically. Specific defenses respond to particular antigens, such as proteins on the surfaces of pathogenic bacteria, recognised by the adaptive immune system. Immune systems evolved in deuterostomes as shown in the cladogram.

- Deuterostomes innate immunity
  - Echinoderms, hemichordates, cephalochordates, urochordates
  - Vertebrates
    - VLR adaptive immunity
      Jawless fishes
    - V(D)J adaptive immunity
      Jawed fishes and tetrapods

Immune organs vary by type of fish. The jawless fish have lymphoid tissue within the anterior kidney, and granulocytes in the gut. They have their own type of adaptive immune system; it makes use of variable lymphocyte receptors (VLR) to generate immunity to a wide range of antigens, The result is much like that of jawed fishes and tetrapods, but it may have evolved separately. All jawed fishes have an adaptive immune system with B and T lymphocytes bearing immunoglobulins and T cell receptors respectively. This makes use of Variable–Diversity–Joining rearrangement (V(D)J) to create immunity to a wide range of antigens. This system evolved once and is basal to the jawed vertebrate clade.

Cartilaginous fish have three specialized organs that contain immune system cells: the epigonal organs around the gonads, Leydig's organ within the esophagus, and a spiral valve in their intestine, while their thymus and spleen have similar functions to those of the same organs in the immune systems of tetrapods. Teleosts have lymphocytes in the thymus, and other immune cells in the spleen and other organs.

== Behaviour ==
=== Shoaling and schooling ===
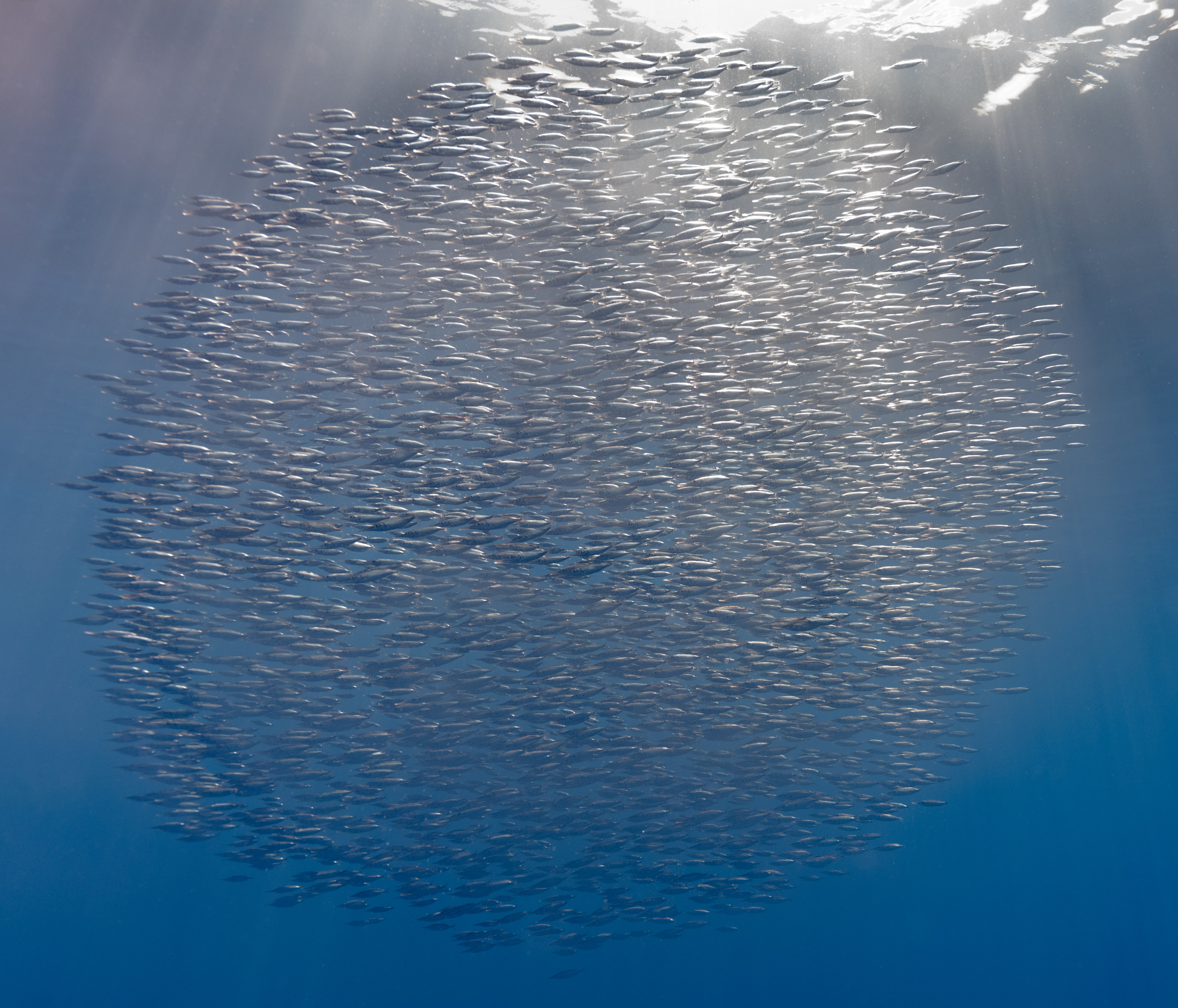
Fish such as these snipefishes school for safety from predators, and to spawn.

A shoal is a loosely organised group where each fish swims and forages independently but is attracted to other members of the group and adjusts its behaviour, such as swimming speed, so that it remains close to the other members of the group. A school is a much more tightly organised group, synchronising its swimming so that all fish move at the same speed and in the same direction. Schooling is sometimes an antipredator adaptation, offering improved vigilance against predators.

It is often more efficient to gather food by working as a group, and individual fish optimise their strategies by choosing to join or leave a shoal. When a predator has been noticed, prey fish respond defensively, resulting in collective shoal behaviours such as synchronised movements. Responses do not consist only of attempting to hide or flee; antipredator tactics include for example scattering and reassembling. Fish also aggregate in shoals to spawn. The capelin migrates annually in large schools between its feeding areas and its spawning grounds.

=== Communication ===
Fish communicate by transmitting acoustic signals (sounds) to each other. This is most often in the context of feeding, aggression or courtship. The sounds emitted vary with the species and stimulus involved. Fish can produce either stridulatory sounds by moving components of the skeletal system, or can produce non-stridulatory sounds by manipulating specialized organs such as the swimbladder.

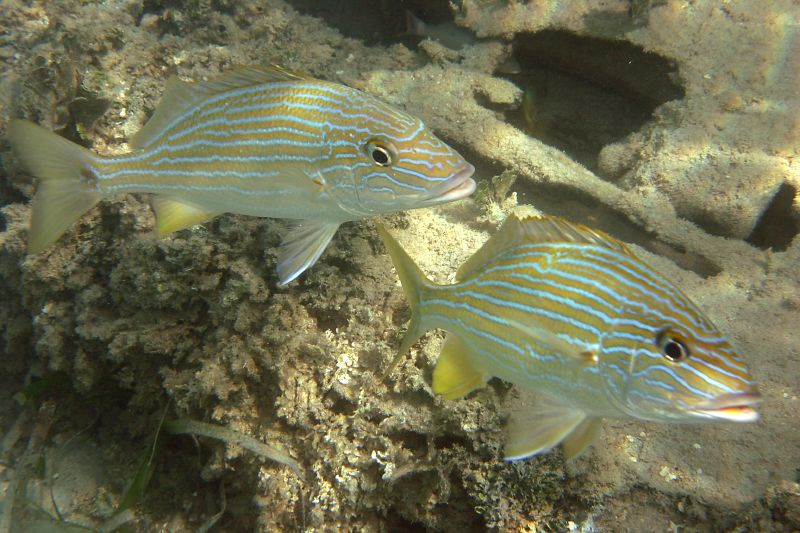
French grunt fish makes sounds by grinding its teeth.

Some fish produce sounds by rubbing or grinding their bones together. These sounds are stridulatory. In Haemulon flavolineatum, the French grunt fish, as it produces a grunting noise by grinding its teeth together, especially when in distress. The grunts are at a frequency of around 700 Hz, and last approximately 47 milliseconds. The longsnout seahorse, Hippocampus reidi produces two categories of sounds, 'clicks' and 'growls', by rubbing their coronet bone across the grooved section of their neurocranium. Clicks are produced during courtship and feeding, and the frequencies of clicks were within the range of 50 Hz-800 Hz. The frequencies are at the higher end of the range during spawning, when the female and male fishes were less than fifteen centimeters apart. Growls are produced when the H. reidi are stressed. The 'growl' sounds consist of a series of sound pulses and are emitted simultaneously with body vibrations.

Some fish species create noise by engaging specialized muscles that contract and cause swimbladder vibrations. Oyster toadfish produce loud grunts by contracting sonic muscles along the sides of the swim bladder. Female and male toadfishes emit short-duration grunts, often as a fright response. In addition to short-duration grunts, male toadfishes produce "boat whistle calls". These calls are longer in duration, lower in frequency, and are primarily used to attract mates. The various sounds have frequency range of 140 Hz to 260 Hz. The frequencies of the calls depend on the rate at which the sonic muscles contract.

The red drum, Sciaenops ocellatus, produces drumming sounds by vibrating its swimbladder. Vibrations are caused by the rapid contraction of sonic muscles that surround the dorsal aspect of the swimbladder. These vibrations result in repeated sounds with frequencies from 100 to >200 Hz. S. ocellatus produces different calls depending on the stimuli involved, such as courtship or a predator's attack. Females do not produce sounds, and lack sound-producing (sonic) muscles.

== Conservation ==
The 2025 IUCN Red List names 2,367 fish species that are endangered or critically endangered. Included are species such as Atlantic cod, Devil's Hole pupfish, coelacanths, and great white sharks. Because fish live underwater they are more difficult to study than terrestrial animals and plants, and information about fish populations is often lacking. Freshwater fish seem particularly threatened because they often live in relatively small water bodies. For example, the Devil's Hole pupfish occupies only a single 3 by 6 metres (10 by 20 ft) pool.

=== Overfishing ===
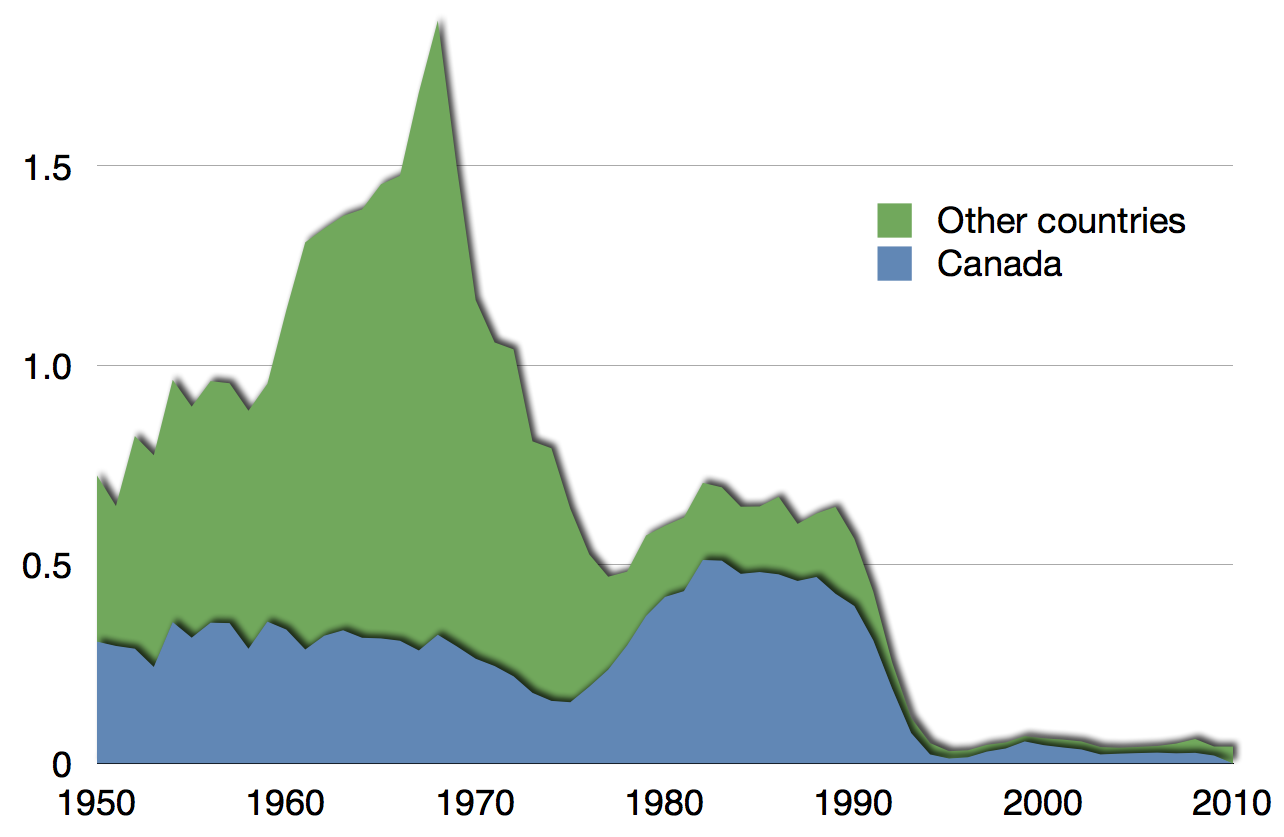
The collapse of the Atlantic northwest cod fishery.

The Food and Agriculture Organization reports that "in 2017, 34 percent of the fish stocks of the world's marine fisheries were classified as overfished". Overfishing is a major threat to edible fish such as cod and tuna. Overfishing eventually causes fish stocks to collapse, because the survivors cannot produce enough young to replace those removed. Such commercial extinction does not mean that the species is extinct, merely that it can no longer sustain a fishery. In the case of the Pacific sardine fishery off the California coast, the catch steadily declined from a 1937 peak of 800,000 tonnes to an economically inviable 24,000 tonnes in 1968.

In the case of the Atlantic northwest cod fishery, overfishing reduced the fish population to 1% of its historical level by 1992. Fisheries scientists and the fishing industry have sharply differing views on the resiliency of fisheries to intensive fishing. In many coastal regions the fishing industry is a major employer, so governments are predisposed to support it. On the other hand, scientists and conservationists push for stringent protection, warning that many stocks could be destroyed within fifty years.

=== Other threats ===
A key stress on both freshwater and marine ecosystems is habitat degradation including water pollution, the building of dams, removal of water for use by humans, and the introduction of exotic species including predators. Freshwater fish, especially if endemic to a region (occurring nowhere else), may be threatened with extinction for all these reasons, as is the case for three of Spain's ten endemic freshwater fishes. River dams, especially major schemes like the Kariba Dam (Zambezi river) and the Aswan Dam (River Nile) on rivers with economically important fisheries, have caused large reductions in fish catch.

Industrial bottom trawling can damage seabed habitats, as has occurred on the Georges Bank in the North Atlantic. Introduction of aquatic invasive species is widespread. It modifies ecosystems, causing biodiversity loss, and can harm fisheries. Harmful species include fish but are not limited to them; the arrival of a comb jelly in the Black Sea damaged the anchovy fishery there. The opening of the Suez Canal in 1869 made possible Lessepsian migration, facilitating the arrival of hundreds of Indo-Pacific marine species of fish, algae and invertebrates in the Mediterranean Sea, deeply impacting its overall biodiversity and ecology.

The predatory Nile perch was deliberately introduced to Lake Victoria in the 1960s as a commercial and sports fish. The lake had high biodiversity, with some 500 endemic species of cichlid fish. It drastically altered the lake's ecology, and simplified the fishery from multi-species to just three: the Nile perch, the silver cyprinid, and another introduced fish, the Nile tilapia. The haplochromine cichlid populations have collapsed.

== Importance to humans ==
=== Economic ===
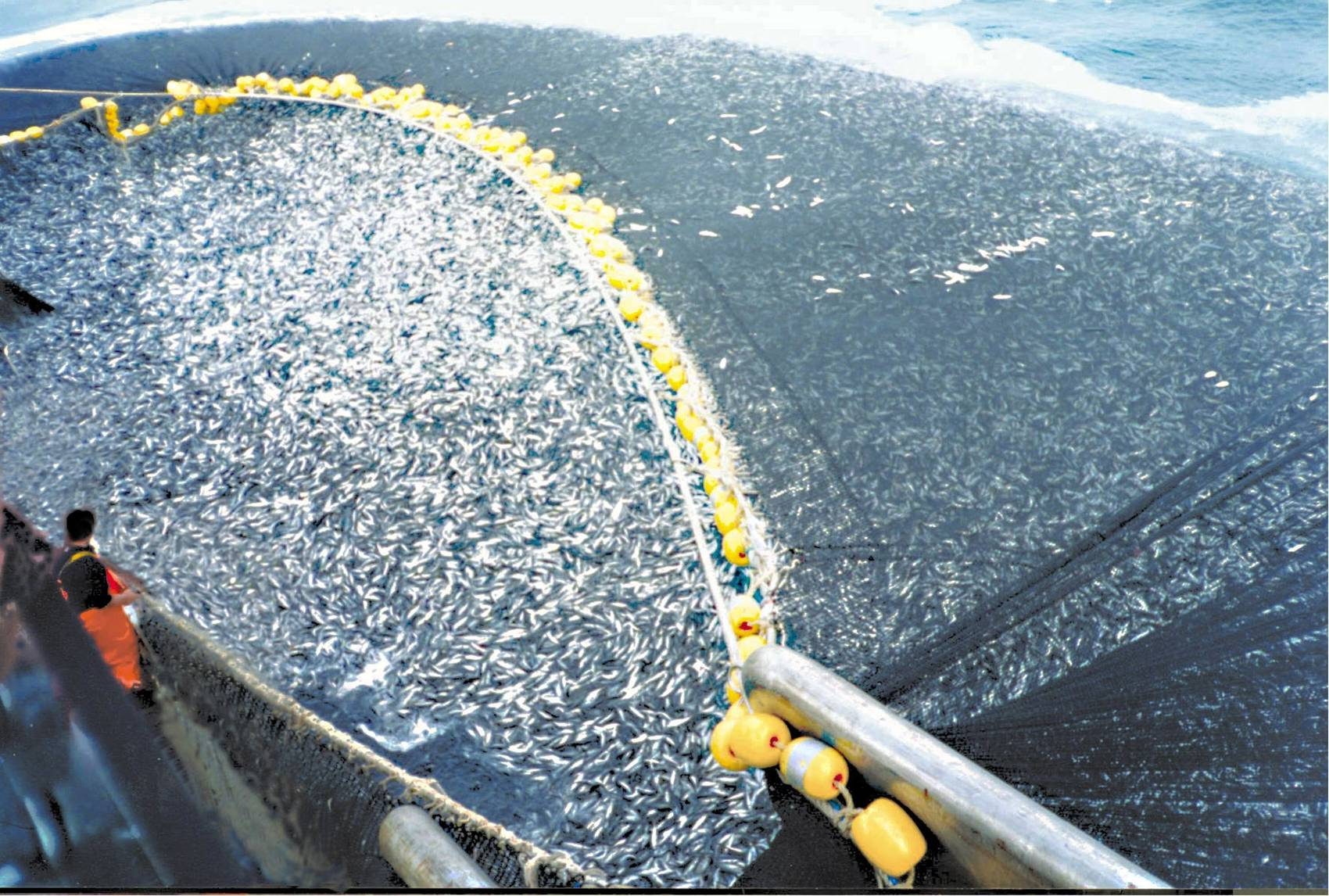
A purse seiner hauling in hundreds of tons of Chilean jack mackerel, 2016

Throughout history, humans have used fish as a food source for dietary protein. Historically and today, most fish harvested for human consumption has come by means of catching wild fish. However, fish farming, which has been practiced since about 3,500 BCE in ancient China, is becoming increasingly important in many nations. In 2007, about one-sixth of the world's protein was estimated to be provided by fish.

Fishing is a large global business which provides income for millions of people. As of 2020, over 65 million tonnes (Mt) of marine fish and 10 Mt of freshwater fish were captured, while some 50 Mt of fish, mainly freshwater, were farmed. Of the marine species captured in 2020, anchoveta represented 4.9 Mt, Alaska pollock 3.5 Mt, skipjack tuna 2.8 Mt, and Atlantic herring and yellowfin tuna 1.6 Mt each; eight more species had catches over 1 Mt.

=== Recreation ===
Fish have been recognized as a source of beauty for almost as long as used for food, appearing in cave art, being raised as ornamental fish in ponds, and displayed in aquariums in homes, offices, or public settings. Recreational fishing is fishing primarily for pleasure or competition; it can be contrasted with commercial fishing, which is fishing for profit, or artisanal fishing, which is fishing primarily for food. The most common form of recreational fishing employs a rod, reel, line, hooks, and a wide range of baits. Recreational fishing is particularly popular in North America and Europe; government agencies often actively manage target fish species.

=== Culture ===
Fish themes have symbolic significance in many religions. In ancient Mesopotamia, fish offerings were made to the gods from the very earliest times. Fish were also a major symbol of Enki, the god of water. Fish frequently appear as filling motifs in cylinder seals from the Old Babylonian (c. 1830 BC – c. 1531 BC) and Neo-Assyrian (911–609 BC) periods. Starting during the Kassite Period (c. 1600 BC – c. 1155 BC) and lasting until the early Persian Period (550–30 BC), healers and exorcists dressed in ritual garb resembling the bodies of fish. During the Seleucid Period (312–63 BC), the legendary Babylonian culture hero Oannes was said to have dressed in the skin of a fish.

Fish were sacred to the Syrian goddess Atargatis and, during her festivals, only her priests were permitted to eat them. In the Book of Jonah, the central figure, a prophet named Jonah, is swallowed by a giant fish after being thrown overboard by the crew of the ship he is travelling on. Early Christians used the ichthys, a symbol of a fish, to represent Jesus. Among the deities said to take the form of a fish are Ikatere of the Polynesians, the shark-god Kāmohoaliʻi of Hawaiʻi, and Matsya of the Hindus. The constellation Pisces ("The Fishes") is associated with a legend from Ancient Rome that Venus and her son Cupid were rescued by two fishes.

Fish feature prominently in art, in films such as Finding Nemo and books such as The Old Man and the Sea. Large fish, particularly sharks, have frequently been the subject of horror movies and thrillers, notably the novel Jaws, made into a film which in turn has been parodied and imitated many times. Piranhas are shown in a similar light to sharks in films such as Piranha.

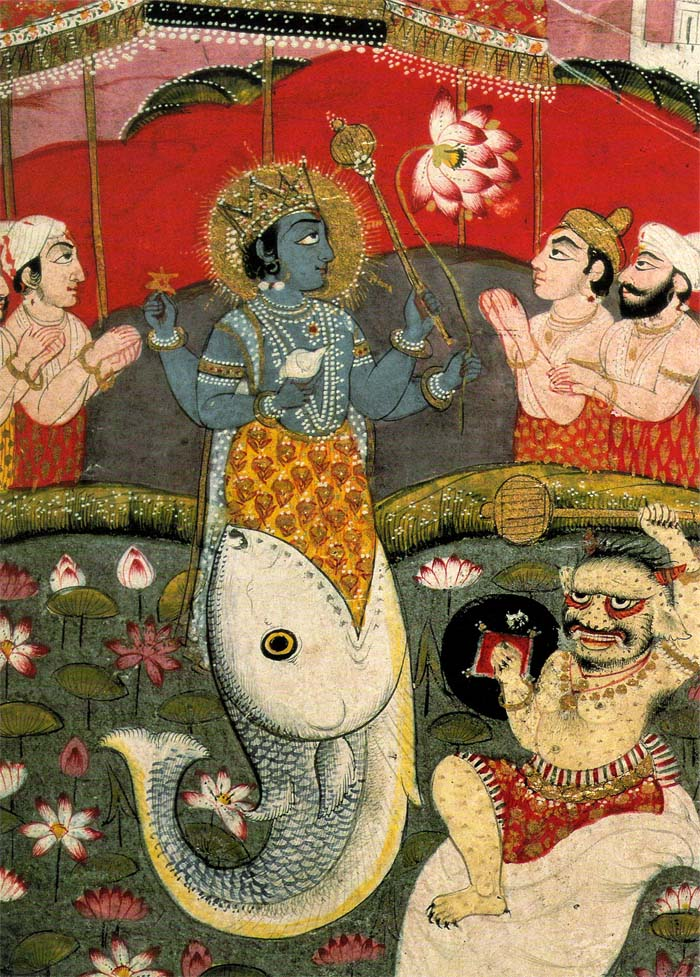
Avatar of Vishnu as a Matsya, India

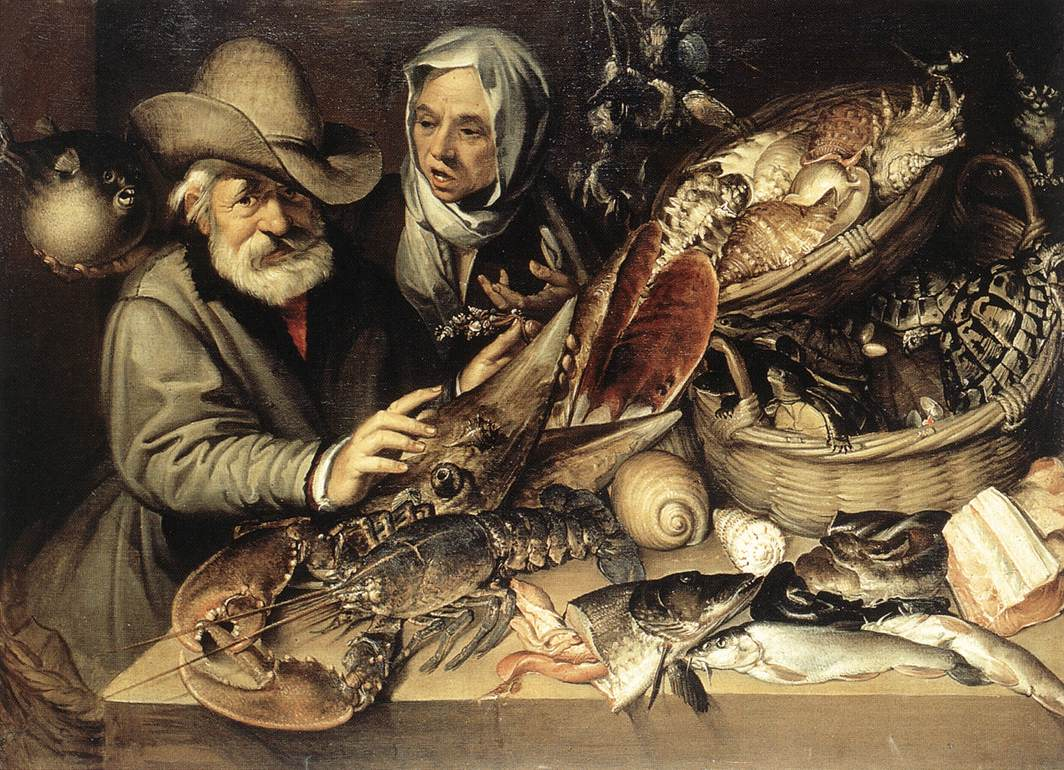
The Fishmonger's Shop, Bartolomeo Passerotti, 1580s

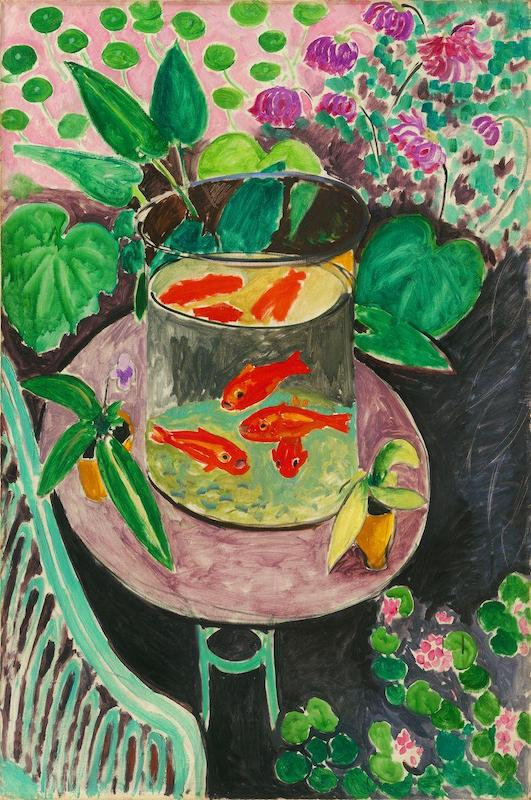
Goldfish by Henri Matisse, 1912

== See also ==
- Deep-sea fish
- Fish acute toxicity syndrome
- Fish development
- Forage fish
- List of fish common names
- List of fish families
- Mercury in fish
- Otolith – bone used for determining the age of a fish
- Pregnancy (fish)
- Walking fish

== Sources ==
- Benton, M. J. (2005). Vertebrate Palaeontology (3rd ed.). John Wiley & Sons. ISBN 978-1-4051-4449-0.
- Helfman, G.; Collette, B.; Facey, D. (1997). The Diversity of Fishes (1st ed.). Wiley-Blackwell. ISBN 978-0-86542-256-8.
- Nelson, Joseph S. (2016). "Taxonomic Diversity". Fishes of the World. John Wiley & Sons. ISBN 978-1-118-34233-6.
