= Moon Nahm =

American physician (born 1948)

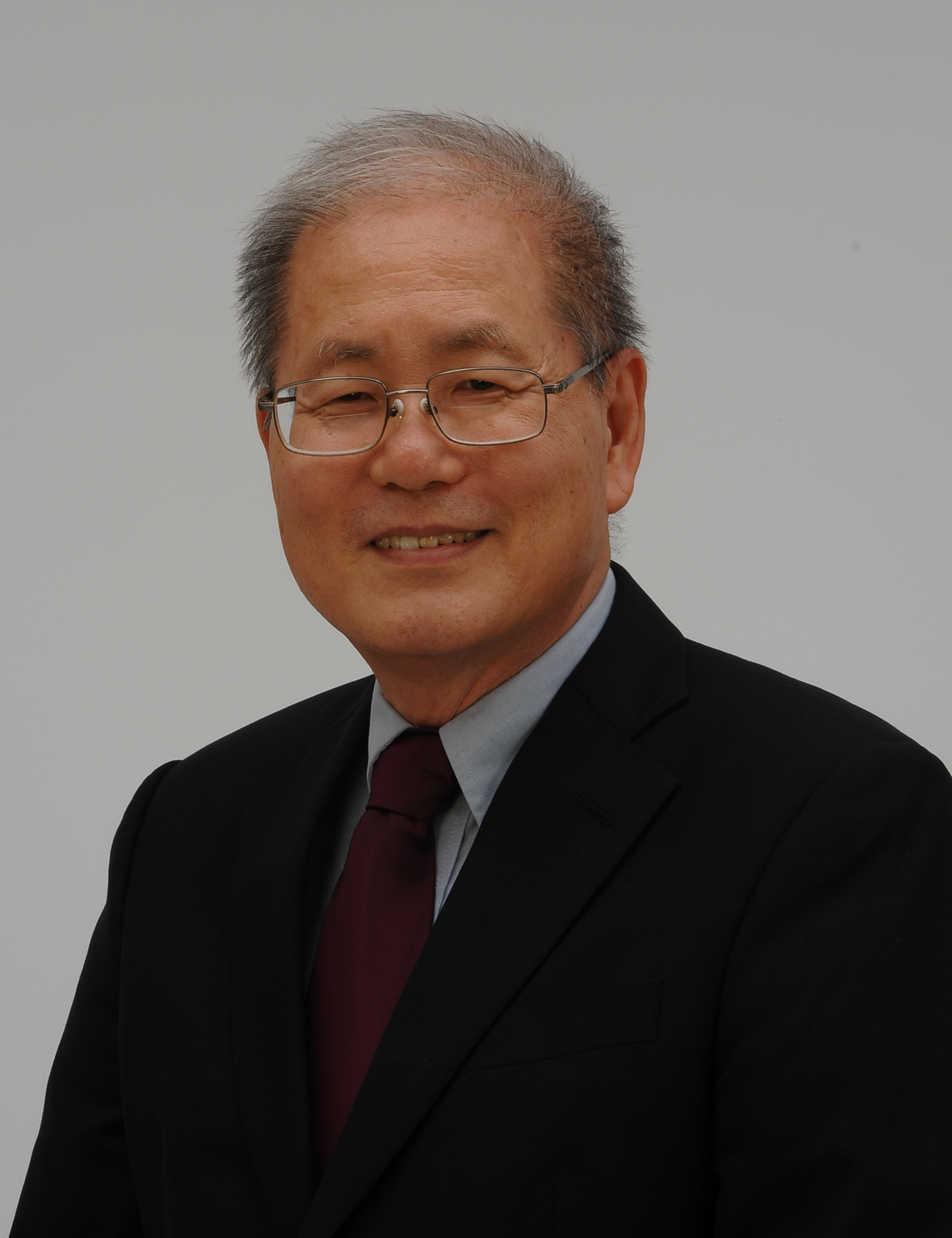
Moon Nahm, M.D.

Moon H. Nahm (born 1948) is an American physician, inventor and scientist. He is an Emeritus Endowed Professor in the Department of Medicine at the University of Alabama at Birmingham, in the United States. He co-founded SunFire Biotechnologies, a biotechnology company in Birmingham, Alabama, USA, that works on pneumococcal vaccine testing. Nahm is known for discovering new pneumococcal capsule types and inventing the MOPA (Multiplexed Opsono-Phagocytosis Assay), which is a global standard for evaluating the protective efficacy of antibodies and is used for pneumococcal vaccine licensure.

== Early life ==
Nahm was born and raised in South Korea. He came to St. Louis, Missouri, United States with his family as a senior in high school. He graduated summa cum laude with a BA in physics and MD from Washington University in St. Louis.

== Academic career ==
Nahm joined the faculty at the Washington University School of Medicine in 1980, the University of Rochester School of Medicine and Dentistry in 1996 and the University of Alabama at Birmingham in 2001. His research studied how the sugar coat of Streptococcus pneumoniae (pneumococcus) helps the bacteria evade the host immune system. The sugar coat, which is called capsule, is also the key component in pneumococcal vaccines. He discovered many new pneumococcal capsule types, demonstrating that some of the new capsule types are involved in evading the immune protections induced by pneumococcal vaccines. He also developed the third-generation pneumococcal Enzyme-Linked ImmunoSorbent Assay (ELISA), which is referred to as WHO ELISA since its adoption by the World Health Organization for use in pneumococcal vaccine studies worldwide. He also invented the Multiplexed Opsono-Phagocytosis Assay (MOPA), which is a high throughput assay for measuring protective function of antibodies. MOPA has facilitated the rapid development of advanced pneumococcal vaccines as well as affordable pneumococcal vaccines for nations that previously lacked access due to financial constraints.

Nahm's research laboratory at UAB is now recognized as a World Health Organization's Pneumococcal Serology Reference Laboratory. To help nonprofit organizations and companies produce affordable pneumococcal vaccines, he has trained numerous scientists from many different countries in his laboratory and shared the detailed procedures for WHO ELISA and MOPA, available through the Bacterial Respiratory Pathogen Reference Laboratory at UAB.

In addition to pneumococcal research, he was likely the first to report the use of monoclonal antibodies as reagents for clinical diagnostic tests and helped his mentors, Drs. Joseph M. Davie and Jay M. McDonald, create a hybridoma center for diagnostic reagents at Washington University in 1980. The center produced hybridomas targeting cardiac markers that revolutionized heart attack diagnosis. He also elucidated the molecular basis for human antibodies to Hemophilus influenzae type b capsule, demonstrated that lymph node germinal centers are the site where both B and T lymphocytes recognizing the same antigen come together, and showed the need of lymphotoxin cytokine for germinal center formation with David D. Chaplin MD PhD. His research has been described in more than 300 research papers.

== SunFire Biotechnologies ==
To meet increasing demands for the MOPA assay, Nahm founded SunFire Biotechnologies in 2019, to offer MOPA services for companies developing novel pneumococcal vaccines. Since then, SunFire has also received government funding and branched out into developing new assays such as a multiplexed serum bactericidal assay useful for evaluating vaccines against other pathogens such as Shigella bacteria.

== Honors and recognition ==
Nahm is a Senior Member of the U.S. National Academy of Inventors. He is a Fellow of the American Society of Microbiology (ASM) and the Infectious Diseases Society of America. The National Institutes of Health referred to Nahm's lab at UAB as a "national treasure" in a review. He received the UAB Presidential Achievement Award in 2017. SK Bioscience and UAB have created endowed chairs in his honor in 2020 and 2021 respectively. He has served on many editorial boards and was the chair of division V of ASM 2012 and councilor of ASM in 2013. He received the distinguished service award from ASM in 2012 and was a councilor of the Association of Medical Laboratory Immunologists for 2015-2019. In 2025, Nahm received the Max Cooper Award for career excellence in research. In 2026, Nahm received the ASM Award for Applied and Biotechnological Research from the American Society for Microbiology.
