= Adaptive immunity in jawless fish =

Jawless vertebrates, which today consist entirely of lampreys and hagfish (the Cyclostomi), have an adaptive immune system similar to that found in jawed vertebrates. The lymphocytes of the cyclostomian AIS have roles roughly equivalent to those of B-cells and T-cells, but instead of variable immunoglobulins and T-cell receptors they use variable lymphocyte receptors to generate the diversity required for an adaptive immune system.

Two lymphocyte lineages were identified in 2009, expressing two different kinds of VLR, VLRA and VLRB. They resembled α/β T and B cells respectively, in function and pathway of differentiation. This suggests that although the two branches of extant vertebrates had adopted different antigen-recognition receptors, the division of labor between T-like and B-like lymphocytes was already present in their common ancestor. Discovery of VLRC^{+} cells in 2013, which resembled γ/δ T cells, further suggested that a tripartite division of labor had been present. As of 2026, six VLR classes have been discovered in lampreys (VLRA through VLRF) and three have been discovered in hagfishes (VLRA through VKRC). The identically-named classes correspond to each other, suggesting the ancestral cyclostomian did have three classes.

== Antigen receptors ==
Jawless vertebrates do not have immunoglobulins (Igs), the key proteins to B-cells and T-cells. However, they do possess a system of leucine-rich repeat (LRR) proteins that make up variable lymphocyte receptors (VLRs). This system can produce roughly the same number of potential receptors that the Ig-based system found in jawed vertebrates can. Instead of using recombination-activating genes (RAGs) to randomly incorporate segments like bony fish Igs, genes coding for VLRs are assembled randomly via a process resembling gene conversion, mediated by a family of cytidine deaminases known as APOBEC. (Note: The B cells of jawed vertebrates use an APOBEC called AID to perform somatic hypermutation, which involves randomly changing bases through error-prone DNA repair. In many of them, the process also leads to somatic gene conversion.) Cytidine deaminase 1 (CDA1) is associated with the assembly of VLRA and VLRC and cytidine deaminase 2 (CDA2) appears to assemble VLRB.

The product of VLR gene conversion is a functional gene expressing a VLR protein. The VLR typically consists of a signal peptide (SP), an N-terminal capping domain (LRRNT), a largely invariant 24-residue first LRR segment (LRR1), up to 9 24-residue variable LRRs (LRRV), a final truncated LRR called the connecting peptide (CP), a C-terminal capping domain including a stalk (LRRCT). This gene is assembled starting from a "skeleton" gene in the germline genome, which contains the promoters, the SP+LRRNT, a large gap, followed by LRRCT. Each VLR type uses its own skeleton gene. (The skeletons vary in their domain composition: VLRB and VLRD skeletons only have part of LRRNT; VLRE skeleton includes part of LRR1; VLRB skeleton has a split LRRCT; VLRF only has the C-terminal part of LRRCT.) Serial gene conversion replaces the gap with LRR1/LRRV/CP segments from donor cassettes located elsewhere in the genome. Some cassettes are shared among multiple VLR types, others are specific for one type only.

It is unclear whether there is a system in place to weed out lymphocytes expressing self-reactive VLRs in the cyclostomian AIS. Selection for length (number of LRRVs) and diversity of the N-terminal domain has been identified, however.

== Lymphocytes ==
The gene expression profiles of lymphocytes (also "lymphocyte-like cells", LLCs) in jawless vertebrates indicate that VLRB^{+} LLCs and B cells, VLRA^{+} LLCs and α/β T cells, and VLRC^{+} LLCs and γ/δ T cells each share a common ancestor. Like B cells and T cells, the development of VLRB^{+} LLCs is spatially separated from the development of VLRA^{+} and VLRC^{+} LLCs. VLRB^{+} LLCs and B cells develop in hematopoietic tissues: VLRB^{+} LLCs develop in the typhlosole and kidneys and B cells develop in bone marrow. VLRA^{+} and VLRC^{+} LLCs develop in a thymus-like organ called the thymoid, similar to T cells developing in the thymus. The expression of VLRA and VLRC are mutually exclusive, much like the α/β and γ/δ TCRs.

There is also a population of triple-negative (VLR{A,B,C}^{-}) lymphocytes that express none of these types. The additional lymprey types (VLRD/E/F) show the highest expression in these cells, but VLRD/E/F also show a little bit of expression in VLRA^{+} and VLRC^{+} cells. These additional types are therefore also considered "T-like".

== Functional characterization ==
VLRB molecules and LLBs can directly bind to antigens and VLRB-transfected cells secrete VLRB protein products, similar to B cells in jawed vertebrates. VLRA^{+} LLCs were unable to bind Bacillus anthracis, Escherichia coli, Salmonella typhimurium, or Streptococcus pneumoniae before or after immunization, suggesting that VLRAs require antigen processing like TCRs. However, MHCs or MHC-like molecules that could present processed antigens have not been found in lampreys, and some VLRAs expressed in yeast were able to directly bind to antigens. The antigen binding of VLRCs has not been studied. However, the VLRC gene is close in proximity and sequence to the VLRA gene and the two are often co-expressed in LLCs, suggesting that both are TCR-like receptors.

== Similar systems in invertebrates ==
VLR-like proteins have been identified in the amphixous Branchiostoma floridae. One identified protein specifically recognizes Gram-positive bacteria and is likely highly expressed in the gill, a potential immune organ. There is no evidence of it being somatically variable.

A VLR-like gene in the Chinese mitten crab Eriocheir sinensis has ten different isoforms from alternative splicing, with different antigen specificities. This offers a limited degree of antigen receptor diversity. Many organisms without an adaptive immune system have expansions in their pattern recognition receptors to provide diversity and this is one example.
