= Communication in aquatic animals =

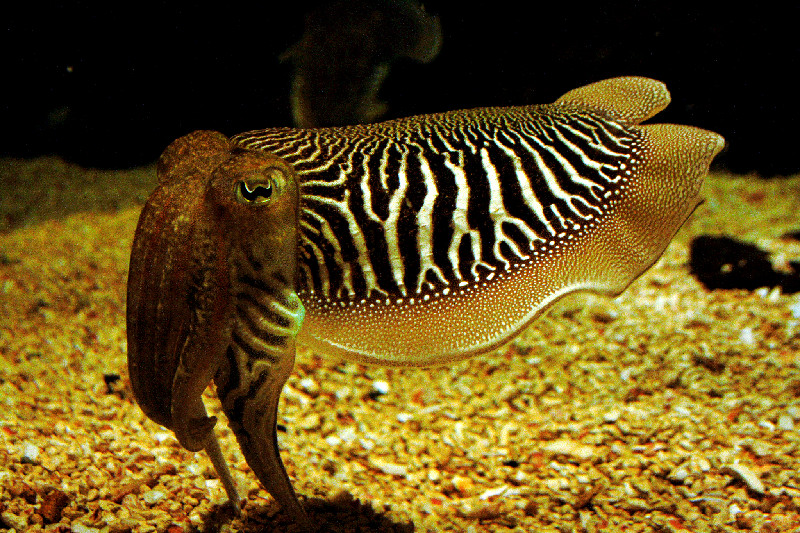
Aggressive zebra pattern display in cuttlefish

Communication is when one animal sends a signal to another animal that influences their behavior in some shape or form. A signal can be any behavioral, structural or physiological trait that has evolved specifically to carry information about the sender and/or the external environment and to stimulate the sensory system of the receiver to change their behavior. A signal is different from a cue in that cues are informational traits that have not been selected for communication purposes. For example, if an alerted bird gives a warning call to a predator and causes the predator to give up the hunt, the bird is using the sound as a signal to communicate its awareness to the predator. On the other hand, if a rat forages in the leaves and makes a sound that attracts a predator, the sound itself is a cue and the interaction is not considered a communication attempt.

Air and water have different physical properties which lead to different velocity and clarity of the signal transmission process during communication. This means that common understanding of communication mechanisms and structures of terrestrial animals cannot be applied to aquatic animals. For example, a horse can sniff the air to detect pheromones but a fish which is surrounded by water will need a different method to detect chemicals.

Aquatic animals can communicate through various signal modalities including visual, auditory, tactile, chemical and electrical signals. Communication using any of these forms requires specialised signal producing and detecting organs. Thus, the structure, distribution and mechanism of these sensory systems vary amongst different classes and species of aquatic animals and they also differ greatly to those of terrestrial animals.

The basic functions of communication in aquatic animals are similar to those of terrestrial animals. In general, communication can be used to facilitate social recognition and aggregation, to locate, attract and evaluate mating partners and to engage in territorial or mating disputes. Different species of aquatic animals can sometimes communicate. Interspecies communication is most common between prey and predator or between animals engaged in mutualistic symbiotic relationships.

== Modes of communication ==
=== Acoustic ===
A blue whale song
Blue whale sound recorded in the Atlantic

Acoustic communication is the use of sound as signals. Acoustic communication is widespread in both aquatic and semi-aquatic invertebrates and vertebrates, with many species capable of using both infrasound and ultrasound for communication. As sound travels faster and over a larger distance in water than in air, aquatic animals can use sound signals for long-distance communication while terrestrial animals cannot. For example, a blue whale can communicate with another blue whale using sound over thousands of miles across the sea.

While terrestrial animals often have a uniform method of producing and detecting sounds, aquatic animals have a range of mechanisms to produce and detect both vocal and non-vocal sounds. In terms of sound production, fish can produce sounds such as boat-whistles, grunts and croaks using their swim bladder or pectoral fin. Amphibians like frogs and toads can vocalise using vibrating tissues in airflow. For example, frogs use vocal sacs and an air-recycling system to make sound, while pipid frogs use laryngeal muscles to produce an implosion of air and create clicking noise. Aquatic mammals such as seals and otters can produce sound using the larynx. Fiddler and ghost crabs can produce non-vocal noise by striking, drumming or tapping on a substrate while they are on shore, while aquatic invertebrates like cleaner shrimp often produce noises by clapping their claws. The small fish Danionella cerebrum makes the loudest sound for its size of any fish, using muscles to tension a cartilage; this is released to strike the swim bladder.

Aquatic animals use mechanoreceptors to detect acoustic signals. Aside from aquatic mammals which have external ears, other aquatic vertebrates have ear holes containing mechanoreceptors. Aquatic invertebrates such as lobster, crabs, and shrimps have external sensory hairs and internal statocysts as their sound-detecting organs.

Acoustic signals are used for:

- Social aggregation: Bigeye fish have con-specific calls that will facilitate social aggregation, and they also produce 'click' sounds to maintain school structure.
- Social recognition: In all pinnipeds, mothers and pups exchange a unique vocalisation that allows them to recognise each other after long foraging bouts. This unique vocal repertoire is also used when the mother coaxes her pup into the water or into a haul-out.
- Mate attraction: Male elephant fish often do not leave their territory and nest, so they use acoustic signals to attract females from a distance. When a gravid female approaches a male territory, he will grunt, moan and growl, in respective order, to signal her of his presence and to attract and induce her into becoming ripe for spawning. The calling continues until she leaves the territory.
- Agonistic interaction: Baleen whales and toothed whales slap their tails to produce extensive, low frequency sounds both underwater and in the air to convey themselves as a threat during disputes.

=== Visual ===
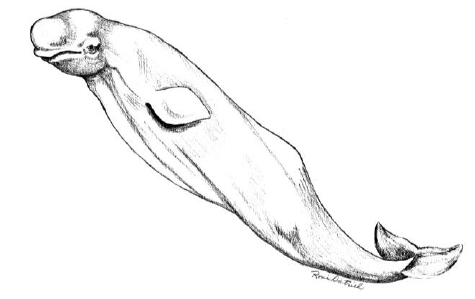
S-posture exhibited by Beluga whale during agonistic contexts

Aquatic animals use visual signals such as movement, postures, colouration, patterns and size. A change in these visual traits can also be considered a signal. Coastal or oceanic species are more likely to use visual signals than species inhabiting the riverine or turbid environment, due to the poor light transmission in turbid areas or in areas with increasing depth and high habitat complexity.

It is suggested that some fish and cephalopods can actively produce and regulate polarised light patterns for communication purposes using light-reflective structures on their bodies. For example, the loliginid squid has a stripe of iridophores along their dorsolateral side, commonly known as the 'red' stripe, which reflects polarised light at oblique angles. The degree and pattern of polarisation on the loliginid squid can be controlled using physiological processes.

Visual signals are detected in animals by photoreceptors. Some semi-aquatic mammals have adaptations for visions (larger eyes, tapetum) that allow them to see and potentially communicate using visual signals even in low light conditions. In some fish, mantis shrimp, and squid, their eyes have a specific photoreceptor structure/orientation that is thought to give them the ability to detect polarized light.

Unlike in the air, the specific light spectral bandwidth and intensity changes across water habitats. The spectral sensitivity of an animal's retinal photoreceptors appears to depend on the colour of the water they live in and can sometimes shift when they move to a different location to maximize visual acuity.

Visual signals are used for:

- Social recognition: Pantropical spotted dolphins have specific body patterns that indicate the status and social role of that individual dolphin- for example, having a white jaw tip will signal that the dolphin is a dominant male.
- Mate attraction and evaluation: Male crabs wave their large claws to signal to receptive females that they are quality mates. The 'head jerk' movement often seen in sea otters is thought to signal reproductive status, though this is yet to be confirmed.
- Agonistic interactions: Male cuttlefish shows a zebra display when sighting a rival male- this display is a signal of fighting intent and the degree of contrast of the pattern signals the strength of the individual.

=== Chemical ===
Many aquatic species can communicate using chemical molecules known as pheromones.

Production and secretion of pheromones are often controlled by specialised glands or organs. Aquatic animals can produce both water-soluble and water-insoluble pheromones, though they mostly produce soluble signals for ease of dispersion in the water environment. Water-soluble chemicals are often dispersed into the surrounding fluid, while water-insoluble chemicals are expressed at the body surface of the animal.

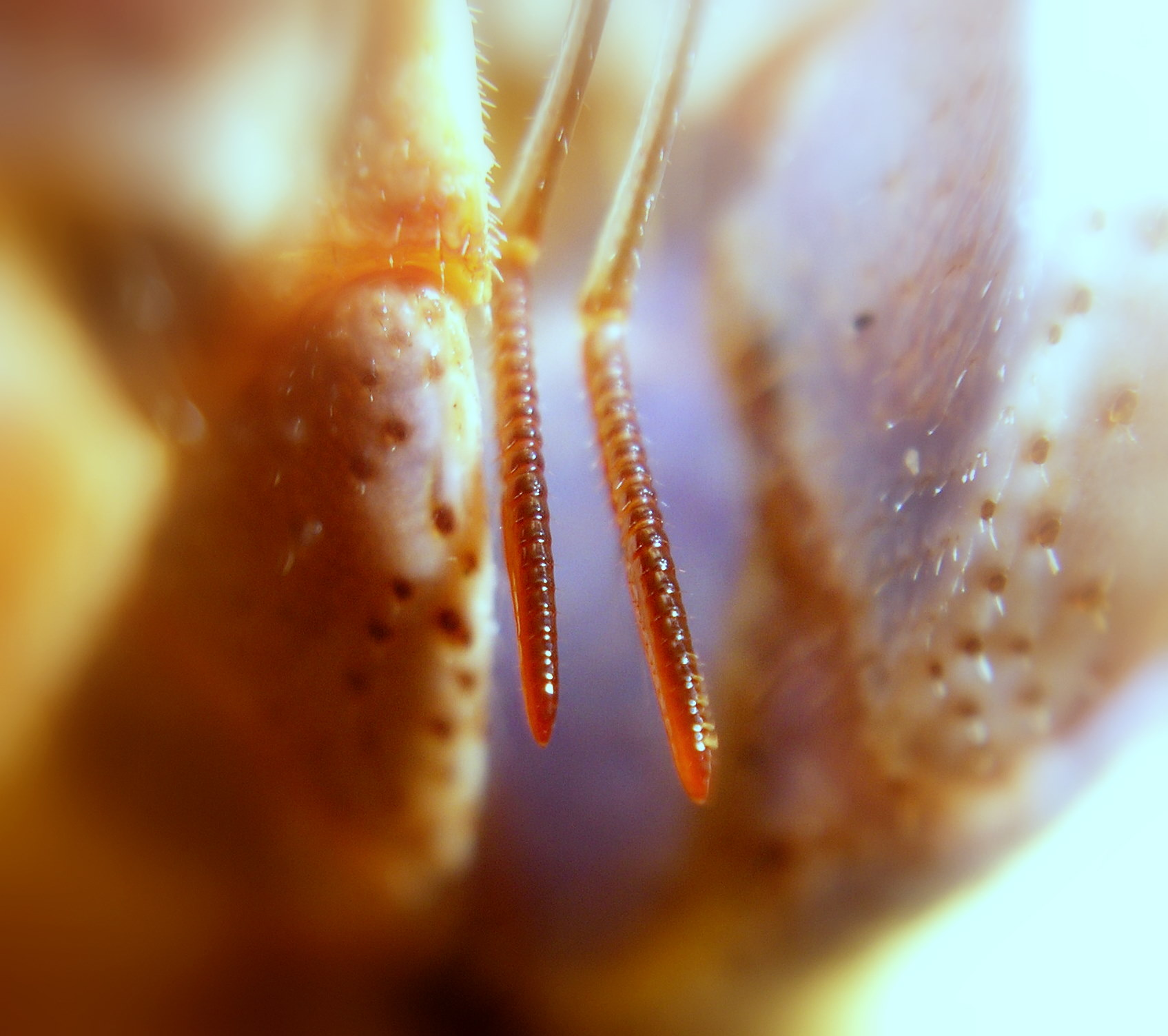
Hermit crab uses antennules bearing shingle-shaped aesthetascs to capture odors.

Crustaceans can release urine containing chemical signals anteriorly through a pair of nephron-pores and can also deposit pheromones on their body surface which are produced by their tegmental glands. Fish release pheromones through urine using their excretory pores and gills. Amphibians such as frogs and toads produced water-soluble pheromones using their breeding glands. Mammals such as dolphins release water-soluble pheromones in their excretions, while pinnipeds have scent glands around the vibrissae and hindquarters that are thought to produce pheromones.

Chemical signals are detected using mechanoreceptors. Crustaceans have chemoreceptors on the antennules. They can sample chemical signals around them by flicking their antennas and by creating water currents that draw the chemicals in their surrounding towards them. Fish have mechanoreceptors lined in their nasal cavity. It is suggested that the multi-ciliated cells around the rim of their nasal cavities generate a water flow to increase chemical detection.

Most semi-aquatic amphibians, reptiles and mammals have nose and tongues. On land, sea otters and pinnipeds often perform 'nosing' behaviors at prominent scent glands which indicate some level of detection of chemical signals. It was previously perceived that they do not undergo chemical communication underwater, as most of these animals close their nasal opening underwater and the semi-aquatic mammals are known to have reduced olfactory nerves, bulbs and tracts. However, it has been found that the semi-aquatic star-nosed mole and water shrew can detect chemicals underwater by exhaling air bubbles onto objects or scent trails and re-inhaling the bubbles which now carry the chemical signals back through the nose.

Chemical signals are used for:

- Mate attraction and evaluation: The pheromone Splendipherin is produced by the male Magnificent Tree frog and is found to attract female frogs. The female snow crab and female helmet crab advertise their reproductive status and attract male using waterborne chemical signals.
- Agonistic interaction: It is thought that the amount and concentration of urinary pheromone produced by crayfish during agonistic dispute provide information about resource holding potential and can promote faster resolution of the fight.

=== Electrocommunication ===
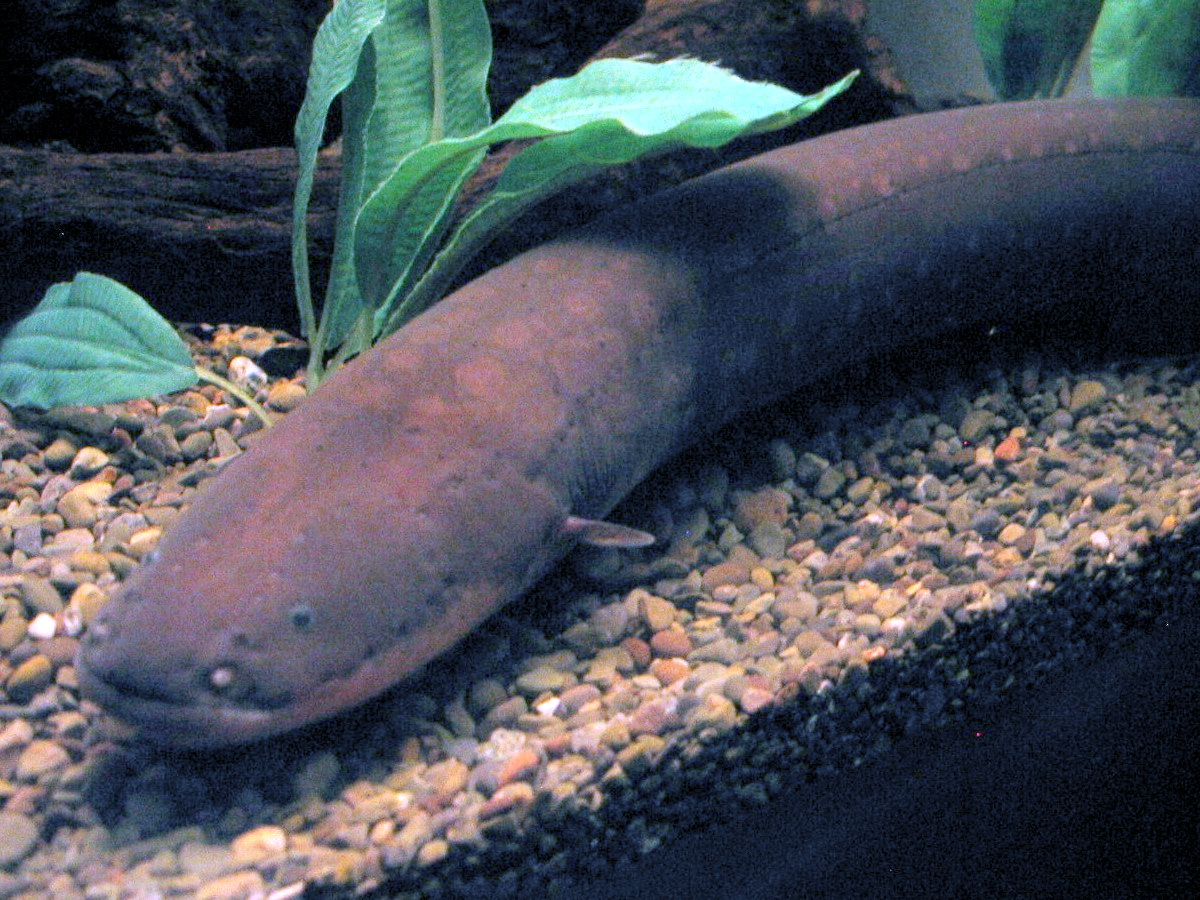
An Electric eel resting on the bottom of an aquarium,

As water is a much better electrical conductor than air, electrocommunication is only observed in aquatic animals. There are various animals that can detect electrical signals, but fish are the only aquatic animals that can both send and receive EOD, making them the only animals to effectively communicate using electrical signals. Weakly electric fish can use specialized electric organs to generate a constant electrical discharge, also known as electric organ discharge (EOD). Electric eels, for example, have three pairs of abdominal organs containing electrolytes that can produce electricity: the main organ, the hunter's organ and the sach's organ. The EOD can be species specific and can even sometimes be unique to each individual. Electric fish can also modify the frequency, amount, duration, silent periods, amplitude and chords of their EOD. The natural EOD and the conscious alterations to EOD are all social signals which have been observed to correlate with many social situations.

Electric fish can detect electrical signals using tuberous electroreceptors which are sensitive to high-frequency stimuli. Electroreceptors exist in different forms and can be found in various parts of the body. Sharks, for example, have electroreceptors called ampullae of Lorenzini in the pores on their snouts and other zones of the head. Electric eels have various patches of tuberous receptors over its body.

Electrical signals are used for:

- Agonistic interaction: During agonistic interactions, there are two modifications of EOD which could signal two different things. Cessation of electrical discharges for an extended period of time is considered an appeasement display to prevent attacks. Variations in the electrical discharge rate is a more complex signal, though generally larger variation seems to function as a threat signal expressing a high degree of attack motivation and is effective in inducing retreat or inhibiting attacks.

=== Tactile ===
Tactile communication, also known as touch, is limited for very short distances as it requires physical contact. Visual displays in very short-range situations often readily become tactile signals. Tactile signals include extensive touching and rubbing during social context using the nose, rostrum, flippers, pectoral fins, dorsal fin, flukes, abdomen, or even entire body. More aggressive tactile signals include biting, raking, butting, or ramming.

Animals detect touch by the somatosensory system which responses to changes at the surface or inside the body. The mechanoreceptors in the somatosensory system can be found the skin surface of most aquatic animals, as well as on the vibrissae of pinnipeds or on the hair of whales.

Tactile signals are used for:

- Mating rituals: Female Hylodes japi frogs signals her acceptance to the male's mating attempt by touching his dorsum with her gular region and touching his feet.

=== Multimodal communication ===
A multimodal signal is one that incorporates various sensory modalities. For example, the male Hylopes japi frog's mating display incorporates both visual signals (foot shaking, throat display, toe flagging) and acoustic signals (peep and squeals) simultaneously. The use of multimodal signaling is not only observed in aquatic animals but also in other terrestrial animals. Multimodal signaling is thought to increase the effectiveness of the signal under noisy or variable environments and offer the ability to signal multiple quality at once. From the basis of the game theory, constraints on cost functions, possible errors across modalities and instances of multiple qualities, signalers and audiences all provide biological benefits that favor multimodal signaling.

== Interspecific communication ==
Interspecific communication is communication between members of different species.

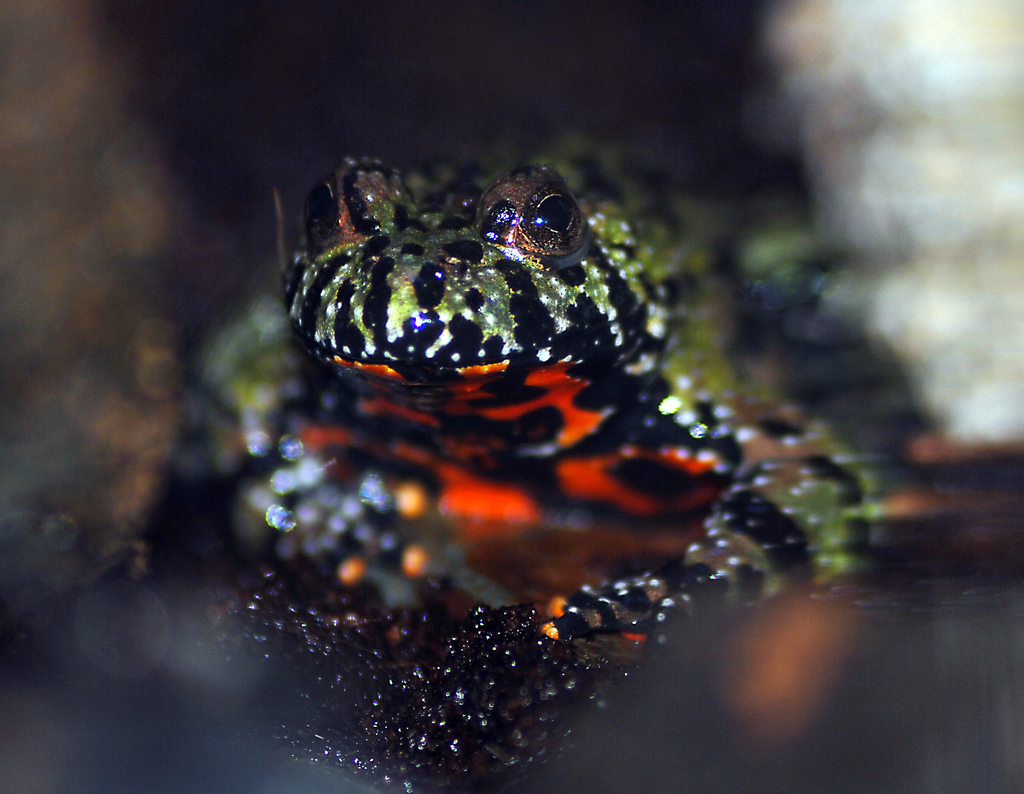
The fire-bellied toad has a brightly coloured belly.

=== Prey and predator interaction ===
Preys often exhibit pursuit-deterrent signals to convince the predator to not pursue and/or eat them. A pursuit-deterrent signal can indicate toxicity. For example, when the fire-bellied toad is attacked, it will adopt a defensive pose and exhibit its bright-colored belly to the predator. The bright colour signals to the predator that the toad is toxic and therefore deter the predator from striking.

Prey may also reliably signal to a predator that they are difficult to catch or subdue, and that causes the predator to desist from attacking or switch their attack to another prey individual. For example, guppies might exhibit a visual signal of approaching and inspecting possible predator which communicates to the predator that the guppies are aware and will be harder to catch. It has been shown that cichlid (the guppies' predator) are less likely to attack the guppies which exhibit inspecting behaviors.

Predators do not often communicate with their preys, but if they do most of the signals they produced are dishonest.

=== Mutualistic symbiotic interaction ===
A mutualistic relationship occurs when two organisms of different species 'work together' and benefit from each other. In some cases, the communication between two organisms provides the basis for this mutual benefit.

An example of this is the mutualistic symbiotic relationship between the goby, a small bottom-dwelling fish, and an alpheid, or snapping, shrimp. The goby usually sits at the entrance of a burrow that the shrimp digs and maintains. While the shrimp works on the burrow, the goby would stand watch. If the goby sees a potential danger, it will flick or beat its tail on the shrimp's antennae. This tactile signal communicates the existence of possible danger to the shrimp and the shrimp will withdraw into the burrow with the goby following suit. This communication benefits both the goby (the shrimp will allow it to use the burrow for shelter) and the shrimp (it can safely put more energy into shelter preparation and maintenance).
